= Comparison of tablet computers =

This is a list of tablet computers, grouped by intended audience and form factor.

== Media tablets ==
Multimedia tablets are compared in the following tables.

=== Larger than 8.5 in (22 cm) screen ===
The following two tables compare multimedia tablets with screens larger than 8.5 in released in 2012 and later.

==== Android ====
This table compares multimedia tablets running Android operating systems.

Model	Release date	Display size	Display resolution	Pixel density (PPI)	Display technology	Android version history	CPU Model	Wi-Fi	Cellular	Bluetooth	Satellite navigation	Storage capacity (GiB)	Storage expansion	RAM (GiB)	Battery life (h)	Camera(s)	Thickness (mm)	Weight	Other features
Acer Iconia A510	April 2012	10.1 in (26 cm)	1280×800 WXGA	149	TFT LCD	4.0		802.11 b/g/n	No	2.1+EDR	Yes	32	microSDHC	1	10.38	Rear: 5 MP, Front: 2 MP	10.2 mm (0.40 in)	680 g (1.50 lb)	
Acer Iconia A700	June 22, 2012	10.1 in (26 cm)	1920 × 1200	224	LCD	4.0		802.11 b/g/n	No	2.1+EDR	Yes	32	microSDHC	1	8.37		10.9 mm (0.43 in)	665 g (1.466 lb)	
Acer Iconia A701	September 2012	10.1 in (26 cm)	1920 × 1200	224	LCD	4.1		802.11 b/g/n	Optional EDGE, GPRS, HSDPA, HSPA+, HSUPA	2.1+EDR	Yes	64	microSDHC	1	8.37		10.9 mm (0.43 in)	685 g (1.510 lb)	
Amazon Fire HD 8.9 in	November 20, 2012	8.9 in (23 cm)	1920 × 1200	254	IPS LCD	4.0		802.11 a/b/g/n	Optional LTE	Yes	No	16, 32, 64	No	1	9		8.8 mm (0.35 in)	567 g (1.250 lb)	
Amazon Fire HDX 8.9 in	November 7, 2013	8.9 in (23 cm)	2560 × 1600	339	IPS LCD	4.2.2		802.11 a/b/g/n	Optional LTE	Yes	4G version only	16, 32, 64	No	2	17		7.8 mm (0.31 in)	374 g (0.825 lb)	
Archos 97 Titanium HD	March 2013	9.7 in (25 cm)	2048 × 1536	266	IPS LCD	4.1		802.11 a/b/g/n	No	No	No	8	microSDXC	1	6		9.0 mm (0.35 in)	640 g (1.41 lb)	
Archos 101 XS	September 15, 2012	10.1 in (26 cm)	1280×800 WXGA	149	MVA LCD	4.0		802.11 b/g/n	No	4.0	Yes	16	microSDXC	1	5.6		8.0 mm (0.31 in)	600 g (1.3 lb)	
Asus PadFone 2	December 2012	10.1 in (26 cm)	1280×800 WXGA	149	IPS LCD	4.0		802.11 a/b/g/n	HSPA+, LTE	4.0	Yes	16, 32, 64	No	2	9.47		9.0 mm (0.35 in)	649 g (1.431 lb)	
Asus Transformer Pad TF300	April 2012	10.1 in (26 cm)	1280×800 WXGA	149	IPS LCD	4.1		802.11 b/g/n	Optional HSPA+, LTE	3.0	Yes	16, 32	microSDHC	1	8.5 (12 with dock)		9.9 mm (0.39 in)	635 g (1.400 lb)	
Asus Transformer Pad Infinity TF700T	July 16, 2012	10.1 in (26 cm)	1920 × 1200	224	IPS LCD	4.0		802.11 b/g/n	No	3.0+A2DP	Yes	32, 64	microSDHC	1	9.5 (14 with dock)		8.5 mm (0.33 in)	598 g (1.318 lb)	
Asus Transformer Pad Infinity LTE TF700KL	July 16, 2012	10.1 in (26 cm)	1920 × 1200	224	IPS LCD	4.0		802.11 b/g/n	HSPA+, LTE	3.0+A2DP	Yes	16, 32, 64	microSDHC	1	9.5 (14 with dock)		8.5 mm (0.33 in)	598 g (1.318 lb)	
Asus Transformer Pad TF701T	November 2013	10.1 in (26 cm)	2560 × 1600	300	IPS LCD	4.2 (upgradable to 4.4)		802.11 a/b/g/n	No	3.0+EDR	GPS and GLONASS	32, 64	microSDHC, microSDXC	2	13 (17 with dock)		8.9 mm (0.35 in)	585 g (1.290 lb)	
Barnes & Noble Nook HD+	November 1, 2012	9.0 in (23 cm)	1920 × 1280	257	LCD	4.0		802.11 b/g/n	No	Yes	No	16, 32, 64	microSDXC	1	9		11.4 mm (0.45 in)	515 g (1.135 lb)	
Google Nexus 9(HTC)	November 3, 2014	8.9 in (23 cm)	2048 × 1536	288	IPS LCD	5.0.2		802.11 a/b/g/n/ac	"LTE" model only	4.1	GPS, GLONASS, Beidou	16, 32	No	2	9.5		7.9 mm (0.31 in)	425 g (0.937 lb) (Wi-Fi); 436 g (0.961 lb) (LTE)	
Google Nexus 10(Samsung)	November 13, 2012	10.1 in (26 cm)	2560 × 1600	300	PLS LCD	4.2		802.11 b/g/n	No	Yes	Yes	16, 32	No	2	7.43		8.9 mm (0.35 in)	603 g (1.329 lb)	
Honor Mediapad 10 FHD	September 2012	10.1 in (26 cm)	1920 × 1200	224	IPS LCD	4.0		802.11 b/g/n	HSPA+, LTE	3.0	A-GPS	8, 16, 32	microSDHC	2	7.33		8.8 mm (0.35 in)	580 g (1.28 lb)	
Kobo Arc 10 HD	December 2013	10.1 in (26 cm)	2560 × 1600	300	IPS LCD	4.2.2		802.11 a/b/g/n with 2x2 MIMO	No	v4.0	No	16	No	2	9.5		9.9 mm (0.39 in)	627 g (1.382 lb)	
Lenovo IdeaTab S2110	October 23, 2012	10.1 in (26 cm)	1280×800 WXGA	149	IPS LCD	4.0		802.11 b/g/n	Optional 3G	4.0	3G version only	16, 32	No	1	8.12		8.69 mm (0.342 in)	580 g (1.28 lb)	
Lenovo IdeaPad Yoga	?	10.1 in (26 cm)	1280×800 WXGA	149	IPS LCD	4.2		802.11 b/g/n	Optional UMTS 3G HSPA+	4.0	Yes	16	microSD	1	18		8 mm (0.31 in)	608 or 599 g (1.340 or 1.321 lb)	
LG Optimus Pad LTE	January 18, 2012	8.9 in (23 cm)	1280 × 768	168	PLS LCD	3.2		802.11 b/g/n	HSPA+	3.0	A-GPS, GLONASS	32	SDXC	1	10		9.34 mm (0.368 in)	497 g (1.096 lb)	
Samsung Galaxy Tab 2 10.1	May 12, 2012	10.1 in (26 cm)	1280×800 WXGA	149	PLS LCD	4.0		802.11 b/g/n	HSPA+	3.0	A-GPS, GLONASS	16, 32	microSDXC	1	8.93		9.7 mm (0.38 in)	580 g (1.28 lb)	
Samsung Galaxy Note 10.1	August 2012	10.1 in (26 cm)	1280×800 WXGA	149	PLS LCD	4.0		802.11 a/b/g/n	GPRS/EDGE, HSPA+, LTE	4.0	Yes	16, 32, 64	microSDXC	2	8		8.9 mm (0.35 in)	600 g (1.3 lb)	S-pen stylus input
Samsung Galaxy Tab 3 10.1	July 2013	10.1 in (26 cm)	1280×800 WXGA	149	TFT LCD	4.2.2		802.11 a/b/g/n	GPRS/EDGE, HSPA+, LTE	4.0	Yes	16, 32	microSDXC	1	6.92		8 mm (0.31 in)	510 g (1.12 lb)	
Samsung Galaxy Note 10.1 2014 Edition	October 2013	10.1 in (26 cm)	2560 × 1600	299	TFT LCD	4.3		802.11 a/b/g/n/ac	GPRS/EDGE, HSPA+, LTE	4.0	Yes	16, 32, 64	microSDXC	3	TBT		7.9 mm (0.31 in)	535 g (1.179 lb)	S-pen stylus
Samsung Galaxy Note Pro 12.2	February 2014	12.2 in (31 cm)	2560 × 1600	247	TFT LCD	4.4.2 – 5.0.2		802.11 a/b/g/n/ac	HSPA+, LTE	4.0	?	32, 64, 128	microSDXC	3	?		7.9 mm (0.31 in)	750 g (1.65 lb)	S-pen
Samsung Galaxy Tab Pro 12.2	March 2014	12.2 in (31 cm)	2560 × 1600	247	TFT LCD	4.4		802.11 a/b/g/n/ac	HSPA+, LTE	4.0	?	16, 32, 64	microSDXC	3	?		8 mm (0.31 in)	740 g (1.63 lb)	
Samsung Galaxy Tab 4 10.1	May 2014	10.1 in (26 cm)	1280×800 WXGA	149	TFT LCD	4.4.2 – 5.0.2		802.11 a/b/g/n	HSPA+, EDGE/GPRS	4.0	GPS, GLONASS	16, 32	microSDXC	1.5	?		8 mm (0.31 in)	495 g (1.091 lb) – 489 g (1.078 lb)	
Samsung Galaxy Tab A 9.7	May 2015	9.7 in (25 cm)	1024 × 768	132	TFT LCD	5.0.2 – 6.0.1		802.11 a/b/g/n/ac	3G, 4G/LTE for models x555	4.0	?	16, 32	microSDXC	1.5 – 2	?		7.5 mm (0.30 in)	450 g (0.99 lb) – 493 g (1.087 lb)	S-Pen stylus for Pnnn models
Samsung Galaxy Tab S8 Ultra	April 30, 2022	14.6 in (37 cm)	2960x1848	240	AMOLED 120HZ	12 - 16	Snapdragon 8 Gen 1	802.11 a/b/g/n/ac/6e	Optional 5G	5.2	GPS, GLONASS	128, 256, 512	microSDXC	8, 12, 16	?	Rear: 13MP + 6MP UW Front: 12MP + 12MP UW	5.5mm (0.21 in)	726 g (1.6 lb) (Wi-Fi) 728g (1.604 lb) (5G)	S-Pen stylus; On-screen fingerprint sensor; Smart keyboard accessory
Sony Xperia Tablet S	September 2012	9.4 in (24 cm)	1280×800 WXGA	161	TFT LCD	4.0		802.11 a/b/g/n	Optional 3G	3.0	Yes	16, 32, 64	SDXC	1	8.52		8.8 mm (0.35 in) (thinnest) 11.85 mm (0.467 in) (thickest)	570 g (1.26 lb) (Wi-Fi); 585 g (1.290 lb) (Wi-Fi+3G)	
Sony Xperia Tablet Z	May 30, 2013	10.1 in (26 cm)	1920 × 1200	224	TFT LCD	4.1		802.11 a/b/g/n	Optional LTE	4.0	A-GPS, GLONASS	16, 32	microSDHC	2	9.83		6.9 mm (0.27 in)	495 g (1.091 lb)	
Sony Xperia Tablet Z2	March 2014	10.1 in (26 cm)	1920 × 1200	224	IPS LCD	4.4		802.11 a/b/g/n/ac	LTE-equipped models	4.0	A-GPS, GLONASS	16	microSDHC, microSDXC	3	10		6.4 mm (0.25 in)	426 g (0.939 lb)	
Teclast M20 4G	July 23, 2018	10.1 in (26 cm)	2560 × 1600	299	IPS OGS	8.0		802.11 a/b/g/n/ac	dual 4G LTE	4.2	GPS, Beidou, GLONASS, A-GPS	32, 64	microSDHC microSDXC	4	9		8 mm (0.31 in)	553 g (1.219 lb)	
Xiaomi Mi Pad 4 Plus	August 14, 2018	10.1 in (26 cm)	1920 × 1200	224	IPS LCD	8.1		802.11 a/b/g/n/ac	LTE	5.0	A-GPS, GLONASS, BDS	64, 128	microSDXC	4	?	Rear: 13 MP, Front: 5 MP	8 mm (0.31 in)	485 g (1.069 lb)	Fingerprint sensor
Xiaomi Pad 5	August 10, 2021	11 in (28 cm)	2560 × 1600	274	IPS LCD	11 – 13	Snapdragon 860	802.11 a/b/g/n/ac	No	5.0	No	128, 256	No	6	?	Rear: 13 MP, Front: 8 MP	6.9 mm (0.27 in)	511 g (1.127 lb)	Xiaomi Smart Pen 1st and 2nd Generation stylus; Xiaomi Pad Keyboard with magnetic connection
Xiaomi Pad 5 Pro	August 10, 2021	11 in (28 cm)	2560 × 1600	274	IPS LCD	11 – 13	Snapdragon 870	802.11 a/b/g/n/ac/6	Optional 5G	5.2	5G version only. A-GPS, GLONASS, BDS, Galileo, QZSS	128, 256	No	6, 8	?	Rear: 13 MP + 5 MP (Wi-Fi) 50 MP + 5 MP (5G) Front: 8 MP	6.9 mm (0.27 in)	515 g (1.135 lb) (Wi-Fi) 518 g (1.142 lb) (5G)	Fingerprint sensor; Xiaomi Smart Pen 1st and 2nd Generation stylus; Xiaomi Pad Keyboard with magnetic connection
Xiaomi Pad 5 Pro 12.4	August 11, 2022	12.4 in (31 cm)	2560 × 1600	244	IPS LCD	12 – 14	Snapdragon 870	802.11 a/b/g/n/ac/6	No	5.2	No	128, 256, 512	No	6, 8, 12	?	Rear: 50 MP + 2 MP Front: 20 MP	6.7 mm (0.26 in)	620 g (1.37 lb)	Xiaomi Smart Pen 1st and 2nd Generation stylus; Xiaomi Pad Keyboard 12.4 with magnetic connection
Redmi Pad	October 4, 2022	10.61 in (26.9 cm)	2000 × 1200	220	IPS LCD	12 – 14	Helio G99	802.11 a/b/g/n/ac	No	5.3	No	64, 128	microSDXC	3, 4, 6	?	Rear: 8 MP Front: 8 MP	7.1 mm (0.28 in)	465 g (1.025 lb)	
Xiaomi Pad 6	April 18, 2023	11 in (28 cm)	2880 × 1800	309	IPS LCD	13 – 14	Snapdragon 870	802.11 a/b/g/n/ac/6	No	5.2	No	128, 256	No	6, 8	9.65	Rear: 13 MP, Front: 8 MP	6.5 mm (0.26 in)	490 g (1.08 lb)	Xiaomi Smart Pen 2nd Generation stylus; Xiaomi Pad 6 Keyboard with magnetic connection
Xiaomi Pad 6 Pro	April 18, 2023	11 in (28 cm)	2880 × 1800	309	IPS LCD	13 – 14	Snapdragon 8+ Gen 1	802.11 a/b/g/n/ac/6e	No	5.3	No	128, 256, 512	No	8, 12	?	Rear: 50 MP + 2 MP Front: 20 MP	6.5 mm (0.26 in)	490 g (1.08 lb)	Xiaomi Smart Pen 2nd Generation stylus; Xiaomi Pad 6 Keyboard with magnetic connection
Xiaomi Pad 6 Max 14	August 14, 2023	14 in (36 cm)	2880 × 1800	242	IPS LCD	13 – 14	Snapdragon 8+ Gen 1	802.11 a/b/g/n/ac/6e	No	5.3	No	256, 512, 1024	No	8, 12, 16	?	Rear: 50 MP + 2 MP Front: 20 MP	6.5 mm (0.26 in)	750 g (1.65 lb)	Xiaomi Focus Pen stylus; Xiaomi Pad 6 Max Touchpad Keyboard with magnetic connection
Redmi Pad SE	August 15, 2023	11 in (28 cm)	1920 × 1200	207	IPS LCD	13 – 14	Snapdragon 680	802.11 a/b/g/n/ac	No	5.0	No	128, 256	microSDXC	4, 6, 8	13.93	Rear: 8 MP, Front: 5 MP	7.1 mm (0.28 in)	478 g (1.054 lb)	
Xiaomi Pad 6S Pro 12.4	February 22, 2024	12.4 in (31 cm)	3048 × 2032	295	IPS LCD	14	Snapdragon 8 Gen 2	802.11 a/b/g/n/ac/6/7	No	5.3	No	256, 512, 1024	No	8, 12, 16	?	Rear: 50 MP + 2 MP Front: 32 MP	6.3 mm (0.25 in)	590 g (1.30 lb)	Fingerprint sensor; Xiaomi Focus Pen stylus; Xiaomi Pad 6S Pro Touchpad Keyboard with magnetic connection
Model	Release date	Display size	Display resolution	Pixel density (PPI)	Display technology	Operating system	CPU model	Wi-Fi	Cellular	Bluetooth	Satellite navigation	Storage capacity (GiB)	Storage expansion	RAM (GiB)	Battery life (h)	Camera(s)	Thickness (mm)	Weight	Other features

==== iOS ====
This table compares multimedia tablets running the iOS operating system.

Model	Release date	Display size	Display resolution	Pixel density (PPI)	Display technology	iOS version	CPU model	Wi-Fi	Cellular	Bluetooth	Satellite navigation	Storage capacity (GiB)	Storage expansion	RAM (GiB)	Battery life (h) (Note: Video playback time.)	Thickness (mm)	Weight
Apple iPad (3rd generation)	March 16, 2012	9.7 in (25 cm)	2048 × 1536	264	IPS LCD	5.1 (upgradable to 9.3.5)	Apple A5X	802.11N	Optional UMTS, HSDPA, LTE, GSM/EDGE	4.0	4G version only	16, 32, 64	No	1	10 (9 on 4G)	9.4 mm (0.37 in)	650 g (1.43 lb)(Wi-Fi); 660 g (1.46 lb) (Wi-Fi+4G)
Apple iPad (4th generation)	November 2, 2012	9.7 in (25 cm)	2048 × 1536	264	IPS LCD	6 (upgradable to 10.3.3)	Apple A6X	802.11 a/b/g/n	Optional UMTS, HSDPA, LTE, GSM/EDGE	4.0	4G version only	16, 32, 64, 128	No	1	10	9.4 mm (0.37 in)	650 g (1.43 lb)(Wi-Fi); 660 g (1.46 lb) (Wi-Fi+4G)
iPad (5th generation)	March 24, 2017	9.7 in (25 cm)	2048 × 1536	264	IPS LCD	10.2.1 (upgradable to 11+)	Apple A9	802.11 a/b/g/n/ac + MIMO	Optional UMTS, HSDPA, LTE, GSM/EDGE	4.2	4G version only	32, 128	No	2	10 (9 on 4G)	7.5 mm (0.30 in)	469 g (1.034 lb)(Wi-Fi); 478 g (1.054 lb) (Wi-Fi+4G)
iPad Air	November 1, 2013	9.7 in (25 cm)	2048 × 1536	264	IPS LCD	7.0.3 (upgradable to 11+)	Apple A7	802.11 a/b/g/n + MIMO	Optional UMTS, HSDPA, LTE, GSM/EDGE	4.0	4G version only	16, 32, 64, 128	No	1	10 (9 on 4G)	7.5 mm (0.30 in)	469 g (1.034 lb)(Wi-Fi); 478 g (1.054 lb) (Wi-Fi+4G)
iPad Air 2	October 22, 2014	9.7 in (25 cm)	2048 × 1536	264	IPS LCD	8.1 (upgradable to 11+)	Apple A8X	802.11 a/b/g/n/ac + MIMO	Optional UMTS, HSDPA, LTE, GSM/EDGE	4.0	4G version only	16, 32, 64, 128	No	2	10 (9 on 4G)	6.1 mm (0.24 in)	437 g (0.963 lb)(Wi-Fi); 444 g (0.979 lb) (Wi-Fi+4G)
iPad Pro (12.9-inch)	November 11, 2015	12.9 in (33 cm)	2732 × 2048	264	IPS LCD	9.1 (upgradable to 11+)	Apple A9X	802.11 a/b/g/n/ac + MIMO	Optional UMTS, HSDPA, LTE, GSM/EDGE	4.0	4G version only	32, 128, 256	No	4	10 (9 on 4G)	6.9 mm (0.27 in)	713 g (1.572 lb)(Wi-Fi); 723 g (1.594 lb) (Wi-Fi+4G)
iPad Pro (12.9-inch) (2nd generation)	June 13, 2017	12.9 in (33 cm)	2732 × 2048	264	IPS LCD	10.3.2 (upgradable to 11+)	Apple A10X	802.11 a/b/g/n/ac + MIMO	Optional UMTS, HSDPA, LTE, GSM/EDGE	4.2	4G version only	64, 256, 512	No	4	10 (9 on 4G)	6.9 mm (0.27 in)	677 g (1.493 lb)(Wi-Fi); 692 g (1.526 lb) (Wi-Fi+4G)
iPad Pro (10.5-inch)	June 13, 2017	10.5 in (27 cm)	2224 x 1668	264	IPS LCD	10.3.2 (upgradable to 11+)	Apple A10X	802.11 a/b/g/n/ac + MIMO	Optional UMTS, HSDPA, LTE, GSM/EDGE	4.2	4G version only	64, 256, 512	No	4	10 (9 on 4G)	6.1 mm (0.24 in)	469 g (1.034 lb)(Wi-Fi); 477 g (1.052 lb) (Wi-Fi+4G)
iPad Pro (9.7-inch)	March 31, 2016	9.7 in (25 cm)	2048 × 1536	264	IPS LCD	9.3 (upgradable to 11+)	Apple A9X	802.11 a/b/g/n/ac + MIMO	Optional UMTS, HSDPA, LTE, GSM/EDGE	4.0	4G version only	32, 128, 256	No	2	10 (9 on 4G)	6.1 mm (0.24 in)	437 g (0.963 lb)(Wi-Fi); 444 g (0.979 lb) (Wi-Fi+4G)
Model	Release date	Display size	Display resolution	Pixel density (PPI)	Display technology	iOS version	CPU model	Wi-Fi	Cellular	Bluetooth	Satellite navigation	Storage capacity (GiB)	Storage expansion	RAM (GiB)	Battery life (h)	Thickness (mm)	Weight

==== Windows ====
This table compares multimedia tablets running Windows operating systems.

Model	Release date	Display size	Display resolution	Pixel density (PPI)	Display technology	Microsoft Windows version	Wi-Fi	Cellular	Bluetooth	Satellite navigation	Storage capacity (GiB)	Storage expansion	RAM (GiB)	Battery life (h)	Thickness (mm)	Weight	Other features
Acer Iconia W510	November 9, 2012	10.1 in (26 cm)	1366 × 768	155	IPS LCD	8	802.11 a/b/g/n	No	4.0	No	64	microSD	2	8.32	8.9 mm (0.35 in)	576 g (1.270 lb)	
Acer Iconia W700	October 26, 2012	11.6 in (29 cm)	1920 × 1080	190	IPS LCD	8	802.11 a/b/g/n	No	4.0	No	128	No	4	7.22	12.7 mm (0.50 in)	1,043 g (2.299 lb)	
Asus Transformer Book T100	December 12, 2013	10.1 in (26 cm)	1366 × 768	155	IPS LCD	8.x	802.11 a/b/g/n	No	4.0	GPS & GLONASS	32	microSD	2	10,40	10.5 mm (0.41 in)	550 g (1.21 lb)	
Asus VivoTab	October 26, 2012	10.1 in (26 cm)	1366 × 768	155	IPS LCD	RT / 8	802.11 b/g/n	No	4.0	Depends	Depends	Depends	2	Depends: 10.67; 7.5	Depends	Depends	
Wacom Cintiq Companion	August 8, 2013	13.3 in (34 cm)	1920 × 1080	166	IPS LCD	8	yes (unknown)	No	unknown	No	256, 512	Micro SD	8	up to 5	17 mm (0.67 in)	1,800 g (4.0 lb)	Wacom digitizer
Lenovo Thinkpad Tablet 2	January 7, 2013	10.1 in (26 cm)	1366 × 768	155	IPS LCD	8 Pro	802.11 a/b/g/n	Optional HSPA+, LTE	4.0	Yes	64	microSD	2	10.45	9.8 mm (0.39 in)	565 g (1.246 lb)	
LG Tab-Book	2013	11.6 in (29 cm)	1366 × 768	135	IPS LCD	8	802.11 a/b/g/n	No	4.0	No	Depends	microSD	Depends	Depends	16 mm (0.63 in)	Depends	Slide-out keyboard
Microsoft Surface Pro	February 9, 2013	10.6 in (27 cm)	1920 × 1080	208	LCD	8 Pro	802.11 a/b/g/n	No	4.0	No	64, 128	microSDXC	4	3.77	13.5 mm (0.53 in)	907 g (2.000 lb)	
Microsoft Surface RT	October 26, 2012	10.6 in (27 cm)	1366 × 768	149	LCD	RT	802.11 a/b/g/n	No	4.0	No	32, 64	microSDXC	2	9.6	9.4 mm (0.37 in)	680 g (1.50 lb)	
Razer Edge Pro	March 28, 2013	10.1 in (26 cm)	1366 × 768	155	IPS LCD	8	802.11 b/g/n	No	4.0	No	128, 256	No	8	3.67	19.5 mm (0.77 in)	962 g (2.121 lb)	
Samsung Ativ Tab	October 26, 2012	10.1 in (26 cm)	1366 × 768	155	LCD	RT	802.11 a/b/g/n	No	4.0	Yes	32, 64	microSD	2	12	8.9 mm (0.35 in)	570 g (1.26 lb)	
Samsung Ativ Tab 5	November 2, 2012	11.6 in (29 cm)	1366 × 768	135	LCD	8	802.11 a/b/g/n	No	4.0	No	64	microSD	2	7.07	9.65 mm (0.380 in)	748 g (1.649 lb)	
Samsung Ativ Tab 7	November 23, 2012	11.6 in (29 cm)	1920 × 1080	190	LCD	8	802.11 a/b/g/n	No	4.0	No	128	microSD	4	4.37	12.7 mm (0.50 in)	857 g (1.889 lb)	
Samsung Ativ Tab 3	June 20, 2013	10.1 in (26 cm)	1366 × 768	135	Super PLS LCD	8	802.11 a/b/g/n	Optional HSPA+, LTE	4.0	Yes	64	microSD	2	9	8.2 mm (0.32 in)	550 g (1.21 lb)	
Samsung Galaxy TabPro S	March 2016	12 in (30 cm)	2160 × 1440	216	TFT LCD	10	802.11 a/b/g/n/ac	?	4.1	?	128 or 256	No	4 or 8	?	6.3 mm (0.25 in)	693 g (1.528 lb)	
Model	Release date	Display size	Display resolution	Pixel density (PPI)	Display technology	Microsoft Windows version	Wi-Fi	Cellular	Bluetooth	Satellite navigation	Storage capacity (GiB)	Storage expansion	RAM (GiB)	Battery life (h)	Thickness (mm)	Weight	Other features

=== 5–8.5 in (13–22 cm) screen ===
This table compares 5–8.5 in screen (multi-)media tablets released in 2012 and later.

==== Android ====
This table compares multimedia tablets running Android operating systems.

Model	Release date	Display	Display resolution	Pixel density (PPI)	Display technology	Android version	Wi-Fi	Cellular	Bluetooth	Satellite navigation	Storage capacity (GiB)	Storage expansion	RAM (GiB)	Battery life (hr)	Thickness (mm)	Weight	Other features
Ainol Novo7 Aurora II	June 2012	7.0 in (18 cm)	1024 × 600	170	IPS LCD	4.0	802.11 b/g/n	No	No	No	16	microSDHC	1	7.0	11.9 mm (0.47 in)	342 g (0.754 lb)	
Ainol Novo7 Flame	September 10, 2012	7.0 in (18 cm)	1280 × 800	216	IPS LCD	4.0	802.11 b/g/n	No	Yes	No	16	microSDHC	1	8.55	10.6 mm (0.42 in)	336 g (0.741 lb)	
Archos GamePad	December 6, 2012	7.0 in (18 cm)	1024 × 600	170	LCD	4.1	802.11 b/g/n	No	No	No	8	microSDHC	1	4.6	15.4 mm (0.61 in)	330 g (0.73 lb)	
Fuhu Nabi 2	August 2012	7.0 in (18 cm)	1024 × 600	170	LCD	4.0	802.11 b/g/n	No	3.0	No	8	microSDHC	1	4.9	29.08 mm (1.145 in)	596 g (1.314 lb)	
Google Nexus 7 (2012)(Asus)	August 2012 mid-month	7.0 in (18 cm)	1280 × 800	216	IPS LCD	4.2	802.11 b/g/n	Optional HSPA+	Yes	Yes	8, 16, 32	No	1	9.82	10.45 mm (0.411 in)	340 g (0.75 lb)	
Google Nexus 7 (2013)(Asus)	August 2013 mid-month	7.02 in (17.8 cm)	1920 × 1200	323	IPS LCD	4.3	802.11 a/b/g/n	Optional HSPA+, LTE	Yes	Yes	16, 32	No	2	7.32	8.7 mm (0.34 in)	290 g (0.64 lb)	
Amazon Kindle Fire HD	September 14, 2012	7.0 in (18 cm)	1280 × 800	216	IPS LCD	4.0	802.11 a/b/g/n	No	Yes	No	16, 32	No	1	9.95	10.3 mm (0.41 in)	395 g (0.871 lb)	
Amazon Kindle Fire HDX	October 18, 2013	7.0 in (18 cm)	1920 × 1200	323	IPS LCD	4.4.3 (customized as Fire OS4)	802.11 a/b/g/n	Optional	Yes	No	16, 32, 64	No	2	11	9 mm (0.35 in)	303 g (0.668 lb)	
Kobo Arc	November 2012	7.0 in (18 cm)	1280 × 800	215	IPS LCD	4.0	802.11 b/g/n	No	No	No	16, 32, 64	No	1	Unknown	11.5 mm (0.45 in)	364 g (0.802 lb)	
Milagrow TabTop 7.4	May 2012	7.0 in (18 cm)	800 × 600	137	LCD	4.0	802.11 b/g/n	No	No	A-GPS	4, 16	microSD	0.5	Unknown	6.5 mm (0.26 in)	361 g (0.796 lb)	
Barnes & Noble Nook HD	November 1, 2012	7.0 in (18 cm)	1440 × 900	243	IPS LCD	4.0	802.11 b/g/n	No	Yes	No	8, 16	microSDHC	1	9	11 mm (0.43 in)	315 g (0.694 lb)	
LG G Pad 8.3	September 2013	8.3 in (21 cm)	1920 × 1080	273	TFT LCD	4.2.2	802.11 a/b/g/n	Optional HSPA+, LTE unreleased	4.0	A-GPS, GLONASS	16	microSDXC	2	TBT	8.3 mm (0.33 in)	338 g (0.745 lb)	
Nvidia Shield Tablet	September 2014	8.0 in (20 cm)	1920 × 1200	294	IPS LCD	4.4.2	802.11 a/b/g/n	Optional GPRS/EDGE, HSPA+	4.0	GPS, GLONASS	16, 32	microSDXC (128 GB)	2	10.8	9.2 mm (0.36 in)	390 g (0.86 lb)	
Samsung Galaxy Tab 2 7.0	April 2012	7.0 in (18 cm)	1024 × 600	169	PLS LCD	4.0	802.11 b/g/n	GPRS/EDGE, HSPA+	3.0	A-GPS, GLONASS	8, 16, 32	microSD	1	7.63	10.5 mm (0.41 in)	344 g (0.758 lb)	
Samsung Galaxy Tab 3 7.0	July 7, 2013	7.0 in (18 cm)	1024 × 600	169	TFT LCD	4.1	802.11 a/b/g/n	HSPA+	3.0	A-GPS, GLONASS	8, 16	microSDXC	1	8.6	9.9 mm (0.39 in)	306 g (0.675 lb)	
Samsung Galaxy Note 8.0	April 11, 2013	8.0 in (20 cm)	1280 × 800	189	TFT LCD	4.1	802.11 a/b/g/n	HSPA+, LTE	4.0	A-GPS, GLONASS	16, 32	microSDXC	2	7.3	7.95 mm (0.313 in)	340 g (0.75 lb)	S-pen stylus
Samsung Galaxy Tab 3 8.0	July 7, 2013	8.0 in (20 cm)	1280 × 800	189	TFT LCD	4.2.2	802.11 a/b/g/n	HSPA+, LTE	4.0	A-GPS, GLONASS	16, 32	microSDXC	1.5	7.3	7.4 mm (0.29 in)	314 g (0.692 lb)	
Samsung Galaxy Note 3	September 2013	5.7 in (14 cm)	1920 × 1080	388	Full HD Super AMOLED	4.3	802.11 a/b/g/n/ac	GPRS/EDGE, HSPA+, LTE	4.0+LE	A-GPS, GLONASS	16, 32, 64	microSDHC	8 (GSM); 4 (LTE)	TBT	8.3 mm (0.33 in)	168 g (0.370 lb)	S-pen stylus
Samsung Galaxy Tab S 8.4	July 2, 2014	8.4 in (21 cm)	2560 × 1600	359	Super AMOLED	4.4.2 → 5.0.2 → 6.0.1 in USA and Canada	802.11 a/b/g/n/ac	T705: 3G, 4G/LTE; T707V: Verizon CDMA	4.0	A-GPS, GLONASS	16 – 32	microSDHC	3	10	6.6 mm (0.26 in)	294–298 g (0.648–0.657 lb)	32-bits only
Samsung Galaxy Tab 4 NOOK	September 2014	7 in (18 cm)	1280 × 800	216		4.4	802.11 a/b/g/n	No	No	Yes	8	microSDHC		10	8.9 mm (0.35 in)	276 g (0.608 lb)	
Toshiba Excite 7.7	June 2012	7.7 in (20 cm)	1280 × 800	196	Super AMOLED plus	4.0	802.11 b/g/n	No	3.0	Yes	16, 32	microSDXC	1	10.57	7.87 mm (0.310 in)	341 g (0.752 lb)	
Xiaomi Mi Pad	March 12, 2015	7.9 in (20 cm)	2048 × 1536	326	IPS LCD	4.4	802.11 a/b/g/n/ac	No	4.0	No	16, 64	microSDXC	2	11	8.5 mm (0.33 in)	360 g (0.79 lb)	
Xiaomi Mi Pad 2	November 24, 2015	7.9 in (20 cm)	2048 × 1536	326	IPS LCD	5.1	802.11 a/b/g/n/ac	No	4.1	No	16, 64	No	2	12.5	7 mm (0.28 in)	328 g (0.723 lb)	
Xiaomi Mi Pad 3	April 5, 2017	7.9 in (20 cm)	2048 × 1536	326	IPS LCD	7.0	802.11 a/b/g/n/ac	No	4.1	No	64	microSDXC	4	12	7 mm (0.28 in)	328 g (0.723 lb)	
Xiaomi Mi Pad 4	June 25, 2018	8.0 in (20 cm)	1920 × 1200	283	IPS LCD	8.1	802.11 a/b/g/n/ac	Optional LTE	5.0	LTE version only. A-GPS, GLONASS, BDS	32 (Wi-Fi), 64 (Wi-Fi / LTE)	microSDXC	3 (Wi-Fi) 4 (Wi-Fi / LTE)		7.9 mm (0.31 in)	342.5 g (0.755 lb)	

==== iOS ====
This table compares multimedia tablets running iOS operating systems.

Model	Release date	Display	Display resolution	Pixel density (PPI)	Display technology	Operating system	CPU model	Wi-Fi	Cellular	Bluetooth	Satellite navigation	Storage capacity (GiB)	Storage expansion	RAM (GiB)	Battery life (hr)	Thickness (mm)	Weight
Apple iPad Mini	November 2, 2012	7.9 in (20 cm)	1024 × 768	163	IPS LCD	iOS 6.0 (upgradable to 9.3.5)	Apple A5	802.11 a/b/g/n	Optional UMTS, HSDPA, LTE, GSM/EDGE	4.0	4G version only	16, 32, 64	No	0.5	10	7.2 mm (0.28 in)	308 g (0.679 lb) (Wi-Fi); 312 g (0.688 lb) (Wi-Fi+4G)
Apple iPad Mini 2	November 12, 2013	7.9 in (20 cm)	2048 × 1536	326	IPS LCD	iOS 7.0 (upgradable to 11+)	Apple A7	802.11 a/b/g/n	Optional UMTS, HSDPA, LTE, GSM/EDGE	4.0	4G version only	16, 32, 64, 128	No	1	10	7.5 mm (0.30 in)	331 g (0.730 lb) (Wi-Fi); 341 g (0.752 lb) (Wi-Fi+4G)
Apple iPad Mini 3	October 24, 2014	7.9 in (20 cm)	2048 × 1536	326	IPS LCD	iOS 8.1 (upgradable to 11+)	Apple A7	802.11 a/b/g/n + MIMO	Optional UMTS, HSDPA, LTE, GSM/EDGE	4.0	4G version only	16, 64, 128	No	1	10	7.5 mm (0.30 in)	331 g (0.730 lb) (Wi-Fi); 341 g (0.752 lb) (Wi-Fi+4G)
Apple iPad Mini 4	September 9, 2015	7.9 in (20 cm)	2048 × 1536	326	IPS LCD	iOS 9.0 (upgradable to 11+)	Apple A8	802.11 a/b/g/n + MIMO	Optional UMTS, HSDPA, LTE, GSM/EDGE	4.0	4G version only	16, 64, 128	No	1	10	6.1 mm (0.24 in)	298 g (0.657 lb) (Wi-Fi); 304 g (0.670 lb) (Wi-Fi+4G)

==== Windows ====
This table compares multimedia tablets running Windows operating systems.

Model	Release date	Mfr	Display	Display resolution	Pixel density (PPI)	Display technology	Operating system	CPU model	Wi-Fi	Cellular	Bluetooth	Satellite navigation	Storage capacity (GiB)	Storage expansion	RAM (GiB)	Battery life (hr)	Thickness (mm)	Weight
Nextbook 8 Windows	2014	eFun/YiFeng Digital	8 in (20 cm)	1280 × 800	189	TN LCD	Windows 8.1 (upgradable to 10)	Intel Atom Z3735G	802.11 b/g/n	No	4.0	No	16	microSDXC	1	6.5	8.5 mm (0.33 in)	0.8 lb (360 g)
Xiaomi Mi Pad 2	November 2015	Xiaomi	7.9 in (20 cm)	2048 × 1536	326	IPS LCD	Windows 10	Intel Atom X5-Z8500	802.11 a/b/g/n/ac	No	4.1	No	16, 64	No	4	12.5	7 mm (0.28 in)	342.5 g (0.755 lb)

=== Older ===
==== 2011 ====
===== 8 in (20 cm) screen and larger =====
This table compares 8 in and larger screen (multi-)media tablets released in 2011.

Model	Release date	Display size (in)	Display resolution	Display technology	Operating system	CPU model	Wi-Fi	Cellular	Bluetooth	Satellite navigation	Storage capacity (GiB)	Storage expansion	RAM (GiB)	Battery life (h)	Camera(s)	Thickness (mm)	Weight	Other features
Acer Iconia A500	April 2011	10.1 in (26 cm)	1280 × 800	LCD	Android 4.0.3 ICS	Nvidia Tegra 250	802.11 b/g/n	UMTS, HSDPA, LTE	2.1+EDR	A-GPS	8, 16, 32	microSDHC	1	7		13.3 mm (0.52 in)	730 g (1.61 lb)	
Adam	January 21, 2011	10.1 in (26 cm)	1024 × 600	Pixel Qi LCD or TFT LCD	Android 2.2 Froyo	Nvidia Tegra 250	802.11 b/g/n	UMTS, HSPA	2.1+EDR	Yes	8	microSD	1	6		14.0 mm (0.55 in)	730 g (1.61 lb)	
Apple iPad 2	March 11, 2011	9.7 in (25 cm)	1024 × 768	IPS LCD	iOS 4 (upgradable to 9.0)	Apple A5	802.11 a/b/g/n	Optional 3G (UMTS/HSDPA & GSM/EDGE)	2.1+EDR	3G version only	16, 32, 64	No	0.5	10	Rear:720P 30 fps, Front:VGA 10 fps	8.8 mm (0.35 in)	600 g (1.3 lb) (Wi-Fi); 610 g (1.34 lb) (Wi-Fi+3G)	
Archos 80 G9 HDD	September 2011	8.0 in (20 cm)	1024 × 768	MVA LCD	Android 4.0.3 ICS	TI OMAP 4460	802.11 b/g/n	Optional UMTS, HSDPA with 3G stick	2.1+EDR	A-GPS	250	microSDHC	1	7		14.7 mm (0.58 in)	599 g (1.321 lb)	
Archos 80 G9 SSD	September 2011	8.0 in (20 cm)	1024 × 768	MVA LCD	Android 4.0.3 ICS	TI OMAP 4460	802.11 b/g/n	Optional UMTS, HSDPA with 3G stick	2.1+EDR	A-GPS	16	microSDHC	1	7		11.7 mm (0.46 in)	465 g (1.025 lb)	
ASUS Eee Pad Transformer (TF101)	April 2011	10.1 in (26 cm)	1280 × 800	IPS LCD	Android 3.2 (upgradable to 4.0)	Nvidia Tegra 250	802.11 b/g/n	Optional GSM Quad bands, HSPA+	2.1+EDR	Yes	16, 32	microSDHC (SD with dock)	1	9.5 (16 with dock)		12.98 mm (0.511 in)	680 g (1.50 lb)	
ASUS Eee Pad Transformer Prime	December 2011	10.1 in (26 cm)	1280 × 800	IPS LCD	Android 3.2 (upgradable to 4.0)	Nvidia Tegra 3	802.11 b/g/n	No	2.1+EDR	No	32, 64	microSDHC (SD with dock)	1	10.28 (16.57 with dock)		8.3 mm (0.33 in)	586 g (1.292 lb)	
HP TouchPad	July 1, 2011	9.7 in (25 cm)	1024 × 768	IPS LCD	webOS 3.0	Qualcomm Snapdragon APQ8060	802.11 b/g/n	3G in 64 GB models	2.1+EDR	No	16, 32, 64	No	1	8.55		13.7 mm (0.54 in)	740 g (1.63 lb)	
Lenovo IdeaPad K1	July 28, 2011	10.1 in (26 cm)	1280 × 800	IPS LCD	Android 3.1 Honeycomb	Nvidia Tegra 250	802.11 b/g/n	No	2.1	No	32	microSD	1	8		13.3 mm (0.52 in)	750 g (1.65 lb)	
Lenovo ThinkPad	August 23, 2011	10.1 in (26 cm)	1280 × 800	IPS LCD	Android 3.1 Honeycomb	Nvidia Tegra 250	802.11 b/g/n	Optional 3G	2.0	A-GPS	16, 32, 64	SD	1	8.7		14.5 mm (0.57 in)	742 g (1.636 lb) (Wi-Fi); 756 g (1.667 lb) (Wi-Fi+3G)	N-trig active digitizer
Meebox Slate	2011	11.6 in (29 cm)	1366 × 768	LCD	Windows 7 Home Premium	Intel Atom N450	802.11 b/g/n	No	2.1+EDR	No	32	microSD	1	Unknown		12 mm (0.47 in)	970 g (2.14 lb)	
Motorola Xoom	February 24, 2011	10.1 in (26 cm)	1280 × 800	TFT LCD	Android 3.2 Honeycomb	Nvidia Tegra 250	802.11 a/b/g/n	CDMA, LTE	2.1+EDR	Yes	32	microSD	1	8.3	Rear: 5 MP, Front: 2 MP	12.9 mm (0.51 in)	730 g (1.61 lb)	
Motorola Droid XYBoard (Xoom 2)	November 2011	10.1 in (26 cm)	1280 × 800	IPS LCD	Android 3.2 (Upgradable to 4.0)	TI OMAP 4430	802.11 a/b/g/n	WCDMA, GSM, HSDPA, EDGE, HSUPA	2.1+EDR	Yes	16, 32, 64	no(XYBoard), microSD(Xoom2)	1	8.95		8.8 mm (0.35 in)	603 g (1.329 lb)	
LG Optimus Pad	April 2011	8.9 in (23 cm)	1280 × 768	TFT LCD	Android 3.0 Honeycomb	Nvidia Tegra 250	802.11 b/g/n	UMTS, HSPA+, HSUPA	2.1+EDR	A-GPS	32	microSDHC	1	8.3		12.8 mm (0.50 in)	630 g (1.39 lb)	
Samsung Galaxy Tab 8.9	August 2011	8.9 in (23 cm)	1280 × 800	PLS LCD	Android 3.1 Honeycomb	Nvidia Tegra 250	802.11 a/b/g/n	Optional 3G (HSDPA, HSUPA)	3.0	A-GPS	16, 32, 64	No	1	10		8.6 mm (0.34 in)	470 g (1.04 lb)	
Samsung Galaxy Tab 10.1	June 8, 2011	10.1 in (26 cm)	1280 × 800	PLS LCD	Android 3.1 Honeycomb	Nvidia Tegra 250	802.11 a/b/g/n	Optional 3G & 4G (HSPA+, LTE, WiMAX)	3.0	Yes	16, 32, 64	No	1	10	Rear: 3 MP, Front: 2 MP	8.6 mm (0.34 in)	565 g (1.246 lb)	
Samsung Galaxy Tab 10.1v	April 2011	10.1 in (26 cm)	1280 × 800	TFT LCD	Android 3.0 Honeycomb	Nvidia Tegra 250	802.11 a/b/g/n	3G (HSPA+, HSDPA, HSUPA)	2.1+EDR	Yes	16	No	1	10	Rear: 8 MP, Front: 2 MP	10.99 mm (0.433 in)	589 g (1.299 lb)	
Sony Tablet S	September 11, 2011	9.4 in (24 cm)	1280 × 800	TFT LCD	Android 3.1 Honeycomb (upgradable to 4.0)	Nvidia Tegra 250	802.11 b/g/n	Optional HSDPA/HSUPA	2.1+EDR	A-GPS	16, 32	SDHC	1	8.58		7.6 mm (0.30 in) (thinnest) 20 mm (0.79 in) (thickest)	595 g (1.312 lb) (Wi-Fi); 625 g (1.378 lb) (Wi-Fi+3G)	
Toshiba Thrive	July 2011	10.1 in (26 cm)	1280 × 800	LCD	Android 3.1 Honeycomb	Nvidia Tegra 250	802.11 b/g/n	Optional 3G	Yes	Yes	8, 16, 32	SDXC	1	7		15.7 mm (0.62 in)	730 g (1.61 lb)	
ViewSonic ViewPad 10	March 2011	10.1 in (26 cm)	1024 × 600	TFT LCD	Android 2.2, Windows 7	Intel Atom N455	802.11 b/g/n	No	2.1+EDR	No	16	microSD	1	4		16.5 mm (0.65 in)	875 g (1.929 lb)	

===== 5–7 in (13–18 cm) screen =====
This table compares 5–7 in screen (multi-)media tablets released in 2011.

Model	Release date	Display size	Display resolution	Display technology	Operating system	CPU model	Wi-Fi	Cellular	Bluetooth	Satellite navigation	Storage capacity (GiB)	Storage expansion	RAM (GiB)	Battery life (h)	Thickness (mm)	Weight	Other features
BlackBerry Playbook	April 2011	7.0 in (18 cm)	1024 × 600	LCD	BlackBerry Tablet OS	TI OMAP 4430	802.11 a/b/g/n	Optional LTE, HSPA+, WiMAX	2.1+EDR	Yes	16, 32, 64	No	1	7.0	10.0 mm (0.39 in)	425 g (0.937 lb)	
Dell Streak 7	April 2011	7.0 in (18 cm)	800 × 480	TFT LCD	Android 3.2 Honeycomb	Nvidia Tegra 250	802.11 b/g/n	HSPA+	2.1+EDR	Yes	16	microSDHC	0.5	4	12.4 mm (0.49 in)	450 g (0.99 lb)	
HTC Flyer	May 2011	7.0 in (18 cm)	1024 × 600	TFT LCD	Android 2.3	Qualcomm Snapdragon MSM8255	802.11 b/g/n	HSDPA, HSUPA	3.0+A2DP	A-GPS	32	microSDHC	1	8	13.2 mm (0.52 in)	420 g (0.93 lb)	N-trig active digitizer
Huawei Ideos Tablet S7	April 2011	7.0 in (18 cm)	800 × 480	TFT LCD	Android 2.2	Qualcomm Snapdragon	802.11 b/g/n	HSDPA, HSUPA	2.1	Yes	8	microSD	0.5	Unknown	12.5 mm (0.49 in)	440 g (0.97 lb)	
Amazon Kindle Fire	November 15, 2011	7.0 in (18 cm)	1024 × 600	IPS LCD	Android 2.3	TI OMAP 4430	802.11 b/g/n	No	No	No	8	No	0.5	7.7	11.4 mm (0.45 in)	413 g (0.911 lb)	
Barnes & noble NOOK Tablet	November 18, 2011	7.0 in (18 cm)	1024 × 600	IPS LCD	Android 2.3	TI OMAP 4430	802.11 b/g/n	No	No	No	16	microSD	1	8.33	12.19 mm (0.480 in)	400 g (0.88 lb)	
Samsung Galaxy Note	October 2011	5.3 in (13 cm)	1280 × 800	Super AMOLED HD	Android 2.3	Samsung Exynos 4	802.11 a/b/g/n	GPRS/EDGE, HSPA+, LTE	3.0+HS	A-GPS, Glonass	16	microSDHC	1	9.6	9.65 mm (0.380 in)	178 g (0.392 lb)	S-pen
Samsung Galaxy Tab 7.0 Plus	October 2011	7.0 in (18 cm)	1024 × 600	PLS LCD	Android 3.2	Samsung Exynos 4210	802.11 a/b/g/n	GPRS/EDGE, HSPA+	3.0	A-GPS	16, 32	microSD	1	8.15	9.96 mm (0.392 in)	350 g (0.77 lb)	
Samsung Galaxy Tab 7.7	December 2011	7.7 in (20 cm)	1280 × 800	Super AMOLED plus	Android 3.2	Samsung Exynos 4210	802.11 a/b/g/n	GPRS/EDGE, HSPA+	3.0	A-GPS	16, 32, 64	microSD	1	12	7.89 mm (0.311 in)	340 g (0.75 lb)	
Toshiba Thrive 7	December 11, 2011	7.0 in (18 cm)	1280 × 800	LCD	Android 3.2 Honeycomb	Nvidia Tegra 250	802.11 b/g/n	No	2.1	A-GPS	16	microSD	1	4.7	12.2 mm (0.48 in)	375 g (0.827 lb)	
ViewSonic ViewPad 7X	September 2011	7.0 in (18 cm)	1024 × 600	TFT LCD	Android 3.2	Nvidia Tegra 250	802.11 b/g/n	No	2.1+EDR	No	8	microSD	1	6.62	12.4 mm (0.49 in)	380 g (0.84 lb)	

==== 2010 ====
===== 8 in (20 cm) screen and larger =====
This table compares 8 in and larger screen (multi-)media tablets released in 2010.

Model	Release date	Display size	Display resolution	Display technology	Operating system	CPU model	Wi-Fi	Cellular	Bluetooth	Satellite navigation	Storage capacity (GiB)	Storage expansion	RAM (GiB)	Battery life (h)	Camera(s)	Thickness (mm)	Weight	Other features
Advent Vega	November 14, 2010	10.1 in (26 cm)	1024 × 600	TFT LCD	Android 2.2 Froyo	Nvidia Tegra	802.11 b/g	No	Yes	No	0.5	microSD	0.5	6.5		13.6 mm (0.54 in)	700 g (1.5 lb)	
Apple iPad	April 3, 2010	9.7 in (25 cm)	1024 × 768	IPS LCD	iOS 3.2 (upgradable to 5.1.1)	Apple A4	802.11 a/b/g/n	Optional 3G (UMTS/HSDPA & GSM/EDGE)	2.1+EDR	3G version only	16, 32, 64	No	0.25	10	✗	13.0 mm (0.51 in)	680 g (1.50 lb) (Wi-Fi); 730 g (1.61 lb) (Wi-Fi+3G)	
Archos 101	November 2010	10.1 in (26 cm)	1024 × 600	TFT LCD	Android 2.2 Froyo	TI OMAP 3630	802.11 b/g/n	Optional Archos 3G Key	2.1+EDR	No	8, 16	microSDHC	0.25	7		12.0 mm (0.47 in)	480 g (1.06 lb)	
ExoPC	October 18, 2010	11.6 in (29 cm)	1366 × 768	LCD	Windows 7 Home Premium	Intel Atom N450	802.11 b/g/n	No	2.1+EDR	No	32, 64	SDHC	2	4		14.0 mm (0.55 in)	950 g (2.09 lb)	
HP Slate 500	October 22, 2010	8.9 in (23 cm)	1024 × 600	TFT LCD	Windows 7 Professional	Intel Atom Z540	802.11 b/g/n	No	3.0 + HS	No	64	SDXC	2	5		14.7 mm (0.58 in)	680 g (1.50 lb)	HP Slate digital pen
ViewSonic G Tablet	December 2010	10.1 in (26 cm)	1024 × 600	TFT LCD	Android 2.2 Froyo	Nvidia Tegra 250	802.11 b/g/n	No	2.1+EDR	No	16	microSD	0.5	8-10		13.7 mm (0.54 in)	700 g (1.5 lb)	

===== 5–7 in (13–18 cm) screen =====
This table compares 5–7 in screen (multi-)media tablets released in 2010.

Model	Release date	Display size	Display resolution	Display technology	Input technology	Operating system	CPU model	Wi-Fi	Cellular	Bluetooth	Satellite navigation	Storage capacity (GiB)	Storage expansion	RAM (GiB)	Battery life (h)	Thickness (mm)	Weight
Dell Streak	June 4, 2010	5 in (13 cm)	800 × 480	TFT LCD	Capacitive multi-touch	Android 2.2 Froyo	Qualcomm Snapdragon QSD8250	802.11 b/g	UMTS, EDGE, HSDPA, HSUPA	2.0	A-GPS	16	microSD	0.5	10	10.0 mm (0.39 in)	220 g (0.49 lb)
Huawei Ideos Tablet S7	January 2010	7.0 in (18 cm)	800 × 480	TFT LCD	Resistive touchscreen	Android 2.1 or 2.2	Qualcomm Snapdragon	802.11 b/g/n	HSDPA, HSUPA	2.1	A-GPS	0.5	microSD	0.5	2.5	15.5 mm (0.61 in)	500 g (1.1 lb)
Barnes & Noble Nook Color	October 26, 2010	7.0 in (18 cm)	1024 × 600	IPS LCD	Capacitive multi-touch	Android 2.1	TI OMAP 3621	802.11 b/g/n	No	Yes	No	8	microSD	0.5	8	12.0 mm (0.47 in)	450 g (0.99 lb)
OlivePad	October 2010	7.0 in (18 cm)	800 × 400	TFT LCD	Capacitive multi-touch	Android 2.2	Qualcomm MSM7227	802.11 b/g	Yes	2.0 + EDR	Yes	0.5	microSD, up to 32 GB	0.5	Unknown	11.5 mm (0.45 in)	375 g (0.827 lb)
Samsung Galaxy Tab	November 2010	7.0 in (18 cm)	1024 × 600	TFT LCD	Capacitive multi-touch	Android 2.2	Samsung Hummingbird	802.11 a/b/g/n	GSM/GPRS/EDGE, HSUPA, HSDPA, CDMA	3.0	A-GPS	16, 32	microSD	0.5	7.0	11.98 mm (0.472 in)	380 g (0.84 lb)

==== 2009 and earlier ====
This table compares (multi-)media tablets released in 2009 and earlier.

Model	Release date	Display size	Display resolution	Display technology	Input technology	Operating system	CPU model	Wi-Fi	Cellular	Bluetooth	Satellite navigation	Storage capacity (GiB)	Storage expansion	RAM (GiB)	Battery life (h)	Thickness (mm)	Weight
Archos 5 flash	2009	4.8 in (12 cm)	800 × 400	TFT LCD	Resistive touchscreen	Android 1.6	Cortex A8	802.11 b/g/n	No	2.0	Yes	8-32	MicroSDHC	0.25	7	10.4 mm (0.41 in)	182 g (0.401 lb)
Archos 5 HDD	2009	4.8 in (12 cm)	800 × 400	TFT LCD	Resistive touchscreen	Android 1.6	Cortex A8	802.11 b/g/n	No	2.0	Yes	160-500	MicroSDHC	0.25	7	20 mm (0.79 in)	286 g (0.631 lb)
Archos 9	2009	8.9 in (23 cm)	1024 × 600	TFT LCD	Resistive touchscreen	Windows 7 Starter	Intel Atom Z510 or Z515	802.11 b/g	No	2.0+EDR	No	32, 60	No	1	5	17.0 mm (0.67 in)	800 g (1.8 lb)
Axiotron Modbook	December 31, 2007	13.3 in (34 cm)	1280 × 800	TFT LCD	Wacom digitizer	OS X v10.5	Intel Core 2 Duo	802.11 a/b/g/n	No	2.0+EDR	No	60-250	No	1-4	3-5	29.5 mm (1.16 in)	5,300 g (11.7 lb)
Nokia 770	November 3, 2005	4.1 in (10 cm)	800 × 480	LCD	Resistive touchscreen	Maemo Linux	TI OMAP 1710	802.11 b/g	No	1.2	No	0.128	RS-MMC or MMCmobile	0.64	Unknown	19 mm (0.75 in)	230 g (0.51 lb)
Nokia N800	2007	4.13 in (10.5 cm)	800 × 480	LCD	Resistive touchscreen	Maemo Linux	TI OMAP 2420	802.11 b/g	No	2.0	No	0.256	SDHC	0.128	Unknown	13 mm (0.51 in)	206 g (0.454 lb)
Nokia N810	January 2008	4.13 in (10.5 cm)	800 × 480	TFT LCD	Physical keyboard, touchscreen	Maemo Linux	TI OMAP 2420	802.11 b/g	No	2.0	Yes	0.256	SDHC	0.128	4	14 mm (0.55 in)	226 g (0.498 lb)
OQO Model 01	October 14, 2004	5 in (13 cm)	800 × 480	TFT LCD	Digital pen, track stick, keyboard, digitizer	Windows XP	Transmeta Crusoe TM5800	802.11 b	No	1.0	No	20	No	0.25	2.25	23 mm (0.91 in)	397 g (0.875 lb)
Samsung Q1 Ultra	2007	7 in (18 cm)	1024 × 600	TFT LCD	Resistive touchscreen	Windows XP	Intel A110	802.11 b/g	UMTS, HSDPA	2.0	No	60	SD	1	3	24 mm (0.94 in)	700 g (1.5 lb)

== Industrial tablets ==
This table compares tablet computers designed to be used by professionals in various harsh environmental conditions. Most of them are rugged. Some are meant to be mounted in vehicles or used as terminals.

Model	Manufacturer	Weight	Display size	Display resolution	Display technology	Input technology	Operating system	CPU model	Wi-Fi	Cellular	Bluetooth	Satellite navigation	Storage capacity (GiB)	Storage expansion	RAM (GiB)	Temp range (°C)	Battery life (h)	Thickness (mm)	Release date
Advantech MARS-3100S	Advantech	2.1 kg (4.6 lb)	10.4 in (26 cm)	800 × 600	TFT LCD	Unknown	Windows XP Embedded	Unknown	Unknown	Unknown	Unknown	Unknown	4	CF	0.5		Unknown	Unknown	Unknown
AIS	American Industrial Systems	4.8 kg (11 lb)	10.4 in (26 cm)	800 × 600	Unknown	Unknown	Windows XP Embedded	Intel Atom	Unknown	Unknown	Unknown	Unknown	80	Unknown	0.5	–20 to 60	Unknown	Unknown	Unknown
Catcher CCAP	Catcher	2.6 kg (5.7 lb)	6.4 in (16 cm)	640 × 480	Unknown	Unknown	Windows XP Professional	Unknown	Unknown	Unknown	Unknown	Unknown	40	Unknown	2		Unknown	Unknown	Unknown
Data Ltd DLI 8300	Data Ltd	1.7 kg (3.7 lb)	8.4 in (21 cm)	640 × 480, 800 × 600	Unknown	Unknown	Windows XP Pro, Embedded, Tablet; Debian GNOME	Unknown	Unknown	Unknown	Unknown	Unknown	40, 60	CF	0.5/1.0		Unknown	Unknown	Unknown
DLoG X 7	DLoG	2.5 kg (5.5 lb)	7 in (18 cm)	480 × 272	TFT LCD	Unknown	Windows CE 5.0; Linux, on request	Unknown	Unknown	Unknown	Unknown	Unknown	0.5	Unknown	0.064		Unknown	Unknown	Unknown
SlimBook 230P/D	PaceBlade Technology	1.48 kg (3.3 lb)	12.1 in (31 cm)	640 × 480	TFT LCD	Unknown	Windows XP Tablet Edition/Professional, Windows Vista Business/Ultimate, Windows 7 Professional/Ultimate	Intel Atom N270	Unknown	Unknown	Unknown	Unknown	80, 160, 250	Unknown	1-2 DDR2	–30 to 70	Unknown	Unknown	Unknown
Quadpad 1	Quaduro Systems	1.19 kg (2.6 lb)	8.4 in (21 cm)	800 × 600	TFT LCD	Resistive touchscreen	Windows XP/Vista or openSUSE Linux	VIA C7-M	802.11 b/g	3G	Yes	Yes	80	No	1	1 to 47	3	42 mm (1.7 in)	2007
eo a7400	TabletKiosk	0.73 kg (1.6 lb)	7 in (18 cm)	1024 × 600	TFT LCD	Capacitive touchscreen or Wacom digitizer	Windows 7 Pro, Windows 7 Embedded	Intel Atom N2600	802.11 b/g/n	Unknown	Bluetooth 2.1 EDR	Unknown	40,80	Unknown	2		Unknown	25 mm (0.98 in)	2012
Sahara Slate PC i500	TabletKiosk	1.49 kg (3.3 lb)	12.1 in (31 cm)	1280 × 800	TFT LCD	Resistive, Capacitive or Wacom Digitizer	Windows 7 Pro, openSUSE Linux	Intel Core i7 3517IE vPro	802.11 a/b/g/n	via optional module	Bluetooth 2.1 EDR	No	320	Unknown	2 DDR3	5 to 35	5-6 hrs	24 mm (0.94 in)	2013
Model	Manufacturer	Weight	Display size	Display resolution	Display technology	Input technology	Operating system	CPU model	Wi-Fi	Cellular	Bluetooth	Satellite navigation	Storage capacity (GiB)	Storage expansion	RAM (GiB)	Temp range (°C)	Battery life (h)	Thickness (mm)	Release date

== Convertible tablets ==
Model	Manufacturer	Weight	Display size	Display resolution, type	Input technology	Windows	Linux	CPU model	CPU frequency (GHz) +32 or 64-bit?	Storage capacity (GiB)	RAM (GiB)	Battery life (h)	Thickness (in)	Release date
Asus R1F, R1E	Asus	Unknown, unknown	13.3	1280 × 800	Wacom digitizer	Windows XP Tablet PC Edition, Windows Vista Business	Unknown	Intel Core Duo T5500, Core2 Duo T8300	1.83+32, 2.4+64	250	2 (max 4)	Unknown	Unknown	Unknown
Averatec C3500 Series	Averatec	2.5	12.1	1024 × 768	Unknown	Windows XP Professional	No	AMD Athlon XP-M 2200+	1.67+32	60	.5	2 (6-cell)	1.2	Unknown
Fujitsu LifeBook T4410 Tablet	Fujitsu	1.8	12.1	1280 × 800	Capacitive multi-touch	Windows 7, Windows XP Tablet PC Edition	Unknown	Intel Core 2 Duo T6570, P8700	2.1, 2.53 + 64	160–250, 80-120	2-8	6 (6-cell), 9 (6-cell + 4-cell)	1.04-1.31	Unknown
Gateway S-7200c	Gateway	2.9 kg (6.4 lb)	14 in (36 cm)	1024 × 768	Pen, Keyboard, Touchpad	Windows XP Tablet PC Edition	No	Intel Pentium M 740	1.73 GHz	40	0.5	7 hours		Unknown
HP Compaq TC4200	Hewlett-Packard	2.08	12.1	1024 × 768	Wacom Penabled	Windows XP Tablet PC Edition	Certified for Novell Linux Desktop 9	Intel Pentium M 740, 750, 760	1.73, 1.86, 2.0 +32	40, 60, 80	.25, .5, 1 (max 2)	5.75 (6-cell)	1.35	Unknown
HP Compaq TC4400	Hewlett-Packard	2.08	12.1	1024 × 768	Wacom digitizer	Windows XP Tablet PC Edition, Windows Vista Business	Certified for SUSE Linux Enterprise Desktop 10 and Novell Linux Desktop 9 SP3	Intel Core Duo T2300E, T2400, T2500, T2600 / Intel Core 2 Duo T5600, T7200, T7400	1.66-2.13 +32, 64	60-120	.5, 1, 2 (max 4)	5.5 (6-cell)	1.35	Unknown
HP Compaq 2710p	Hewlett-Packard	1.68	12.1	1280 × 800	Wacom Sensor, keyboard, Synaptics TouchStyk	Windows XP Tablet PC Edition, Windows Vista Business	Certified for SuSE Linux Enterprise Desktop 10	Intel Core 2 Duo ULV U7600, U7700	1.2, 1.33 +64	80-120, 64	1, 2, 4 (max 4)	5.5 (6-cell)	1.11	Unknown
HP Pavilion tx1000	Hewlett-Packard	Unknown, unknown	12.1	1280 × 800	Unknown	Windows Vista	Unknown	AMD Turion X2	1.8+64	250	3,072	3 (6-cell), ? (?-cell)	Unknown	Unknown
HP Pavilion tx2000, tx2500z	Hewlett-Packard	Unknown, unknown	12.1	1280 × 800 dual-touch (Wacom compl)	Unknown	Windows Vista	Unknown	AMD Turion X2 Ultra RM-7x / ZM-8x	2-2.6 +64	320	3 (max 4)	3 (6-cell), ? (?-cell)	Unknown	Unknown
Lenovo ThinkPad X41 Tablet, X60 Tablet, X61 Tablet	Lenovo	1.71, 1.93	12.1	1400 × 1050 (X60/X61), 1024 × 768 multitouch	Wacom Active Digitizer, multitouch (optional)	Windows Vista Business	No	Intel Core 2 Duo L7500, L7300	1.6, 1.4	60-250	1-3	3 (4-cell), 7 (8-cell)	1.1–1.3 in (28–33 mm)	Unknown
Lenovo ThinkPad X201 Tablet	Lenovo	3.57	12.1	1280 × 800	Wacom Active Digitizer, multitouch (optional)	Windows 7	No	Intel Core i5, i7	Unknown	250–500, 80-128	1-8	3.5 (4-cell), 7.9 (8-cell)	1.04-1.31	Unknown
LG Electronics C1 Express Dual	LG Electronics	1.3	10.6 in (27 cm)	1280 × 768	Resistive touchscreen, keyboard	Windows XP/Vista	No	Intel Core Duo	1.2	80	1	2.5	1.06	Unknown
Toshiba Tecra M4	Toshiba	3.5	14.1	1400 × 1050	Wacom digitizer	Windows XP Tablet PC Edition	No	Intel Pentium M	1.8-2.0	80	0.5-1	3.5 (6-cell)	1.4 in (36 mm)	Unknown
Toshiba Satellite R10	Toshiba	3.5	14.1	1024 × 768	Wacom digitizer	Windows XP Tablet PC Edition	No	Intel Pentium M	1.7	60	0.5	2.5 (4-cell)	1.4 in (36 mm)	Unknown
Toshiba Satellite R20, R25	Toshiba	2.7	14.1	1440 × 900	Unknown	Windows XP Tablet PC Edition	No	Intel Core Duo T2050	1.6+32	100	1	4 (6-cell)	1.6	Unknown
Model	Manufacturer	Weight	Display size	Display resolution, type	Input technology	Windows	Linux	CPU model	CPU frequency (GHz) +32 or 64-bit?	Storage capacity (GiB)	RAM (GiB)	Battery life (h)	Thickness (in)	Release date

== Hybrid tablets ==
Model	Manufacturer	Weight	Display size	Display resolution, type	Input technology	Operating system	CPU	Storage capacity (GiB)	RAM (GiB)
Compaq TC1000	Compaq	1.4 kg (3.1 lb) keyboard off 1.8 kg (4.0 lb) keyboard on	10.4 in (26 cm)	1024 × 768, XGA	Compaq Tablet PC Pen, Keyboard with Pointstick	Windows XP Tablet PC Edition	Transmeta Crusoe	30	0.25-0.75
HP Compaq TC1100	Hewlett-Packard	1.4 kg (3.1 lb) keyboard off 1.8 kg (4.0 lb) keyboard on	10.4 in (26 cm)	1024 × 768, XGA	Wacom Sensor	Windows XP Tablet PC Edition	Intel Pentium M	40-60	0.5-2
ASUS Eee Pad Transformer (TF101)	Asus	0.68 kg (1.5 lb)	10.1 in (26 cm)	1280 × 800	Capacitive multi-touch	Android 3.2 Honeycomb	Nvidia Tegra 250	16, 32, 64	1
ASUS Eee Pad Transformer Prime (TF201)	Asus	0.586 kg (1.29 lb)	10.1 in (26 cm)	1280 × 800	Capacitive 10 point multi-touch	Android 3.2 Honeycomb	Nvidia Tegra 3	32, 64	1

== Educational tablets ==
Model	Manufacturer	Weight	Display size	Display resolution, type	Input technology	Operating system	CPU	Storage capacity (GiB)	RAM (GiB)
Smile Zemi (North American)	Just Systems (USA)	unknown	10.X inches	unknown	unknown	Linux	unknown@??GHz	??GB	?GB

== See also ==
- Tablet computer
- Comparison of e-book readers
- Comparison of netbooks
- Slate phone, a mobile phone form factor
- Smartbook
- Ultra-mobile PC
