= List of tablet PC dimensions and case sizes =

Below is a list of currently available tablet PCs grouped by their width, depth, height, screen size, and appropriate tablet case sizes.

The most popular presently available tablet computers are compared in the following table:

Tablet cases sizes
Tablet PC	Height	Width	Depth	Screen	Case size
Acer Iconia Tab A500	10.2 in (260 mm)	7 in (180 mm)	0.52 in (13 mm)	10.1 in (260 mm)	10 in (250 mm)
Amazon Kindle Fire	7.5 in (190 mm)	4.7 in (120 mm)	0.45 in (11 mm)	7 in (180 mm)	7 in (180 mm)
Apple iPad	9.6 in (240 mm)	7.5 in (190 mm)	0.51 in (13 mm)	9.7 in (250 mm)	10 in (250 mm)
Apple iPad 2	9.5 in (240 mm)	7.3 in (190 mm)	0.35 in (8.9 mm)	9.7 in (250 mm)	10 in (250 mm)
Apple M2 iPad Pro	9.74 in (247.6 mm)	7.02 in (178.5 mm)	0.23 in (5.9 mm(	11 in (279.4 mm)	
Apple ‘New iPad’ 3	9.5 in (240 mm)	7.3 in (190 mm)	0.37 in (9.4 mm)	9.7 in (250 mm)	10 in (250 mm)
Apple iPad Mini 4	8 in (200 mm)	5.31 in (135 mm)	0.24 in (6.1 mm)	7.9 in (200 mm)	
ASUS Eee Pad Transformer	10.7 in (270 mm)	6.9 in (180 mm)	0.5 in (13 mm)	10.1 in (260 mm)	11 in (280 mm)
ASUS Eee Pad Transformer Prime	10.4 in (260 mm)	7.1 in (180 mm)	0.29 in (7.4 mm)	10.1 in (260 mm)	11 in (280 mm)
Barnes & Noble Nook Color	8.1 in (210 mm)	5 in (130 mm)	0.48 in (12 mm)	7 in (180 mm)	8 in (200 mm)
Barnes & Noble Nook Tablet	8.1 in (210 mm)	5 in (130 mm)	0.48 in (12 mm)	7 in (180 mm)	8 in (200 mm)
Blackberry PlayBook	7.6 in (190 mm)	5.1 in (130 mm)	0.4 in (10 mm)	7 in (180 mm)	8 in (200 mm)
Dell Streak 7	7 in (180 mm)	4.7 in (120 mm)	0.5 in (13 mm)	7 in (180 mm)	7 in (180 mm)
Dell Streak 10 Pro	10.3 in (260 mm)	7 in (180 mm)	0.51 in (13 mm)	10 in (250 mm)	10 in (250 mm)
HTC Flyer	7.7 in (200 mm)	4.8 in (120 mm)	0.52 in (13 mm)	7 in (180 mm)	8 in (200 mm)
Huawei Ideos S7	8.2 in (210 mm)	4.3 in (110 mm)	0.61 in (15 mm)	7 in (180 mm)	8 in (200 mm)
Lenovo IdeaPad A1	7.7 in (200 mm)	4.9 in (120 mm)	0.47 in (12 mm)	7 in (180 mm)	8 in (200 mm)
Lenovo IdeaPad K1	10.4 in (260 mm)	7.4 in (190 mm)	0.52 in (13 mm)	10.1 in (260 mm)	11 in (280 mm)
LG Optimus Pad	9.6 in (240 mm)	5.9 in (150 mm)	0.49 in (12 mm)	8.9 in (230 mm)	10 in (250 mm)
Motorola Droid XYBoard 10.1	10 in (250 mm)	6.8 in (170 mm)	0.35 in (8.9 mm)	10.1 in (260 mm)	10 in (250 mm)
Motorola Xoom	9.8 in (250 mm)	6.6 in (170 mm)	0.5 in (13 mm)	10.1 in (260 mm)	10 in (250 mm)
Motorola Xoom 2	10 in (250 mm)	6.8 in (170 mm)	0.35 in (8.9 mm)	10.1 in (260 mm)	10 in (250 mm)
Remarkable Tablet	10.1 in (260 mm)	6.9 in (180 mm)	0.26 in (6.6 mm)	10.3 in (260 mm)	
Samsung Galaxy Note	5.8 in (150 mm)	3.3 in (84 mm)	0.38 in (9.7 mm)	5.3 in (130 mm)	5 in (130 mm)
Samsung Galaxy Tab P1000	7.5 in (190 mm)	4.7 in (120 mm)	0.47 in (12 mm)	7 in (180 mm)	7 in (180 mm)
Samsung Galaxy Tab 7.0 Plus	7.6 in (190 mm)	4.8 in (120 mm)	0.39 in (9.9 mm)	7 in (180 mm)	7 in (180 mm)
Samsung Galaxy Tab 2 7.0	7.7 in (200 mm)	4.8 in (120 mm)	0.41 in (10 mm)	7 in (180 mm)	7 in (180 mm)
Samsung Galaxy Tab 7.7	7.7 in (200 mm)	5.2 in (130 mm)	0.31 in (7.9 mm)	7.7 in (200 mm)	8 in (200 mm)
Samsung Galaxy Tab 8.9	9 in (230 mm)	6.2 in (160 mm)	0.35 in (8.9 mm)	8.9 in (230 mm)	9 in (230 mm)
Samsung Galaxy Tab 10.1	9.7 in (250 mm)	6.9 in (180 mm)	0.34 in (8.6 mm)	10.1 in (260 mm)	10 in (250 mm)
Sony Tablet P	7.1 in (180 mm)	6.2 in (160 mm)	0.55 in (14 mm)	2x 5.5 in (140 mm)	7 in (180 mm)
Sony Tablet S	9.5 in (240 mm)	6.9 in (180 mm)	0.4 in (10 mm)	9.4 in (240 mm)	10 in (250 mm)
Sony Xperia Tablet Z	10.47 in (266 mm)	6.8 in (170 mm)	0.24 in (6.1 mm)	10.1 in (260 mm)	11 in (280 mm)
Sony Xperia Tablet Z4	10 in (250 mm)	6.6 in (170 mm)	0.24 in (6.1 mm)	10.1 in (260 mm)	
Toshiba Thrive	10.8 in (270 mm)	7 in (180 mm)	0.62 in (16 mm)	10.1 in (260 mm)	11 in (280 mm)
ViewSonic ViewPad 7	7 in (180 mm)	4.3 in (110 mm)	0.45 in (11 mm)	7 in (180 mm)	7 in (180 mm)
ViewSonic ViewPad 10	10.8 in (270 mm)	6.7 in (170 mm)	0.57 in (14 mm)	10.1 in (260 mm)	11 in (280 mm)

== See also ==
- List of iPad accessories
- Mobile phone case
- List of Unique PC Cases^{[usurped]}
