= ViewSonic G Tablet =

Android tablet computer

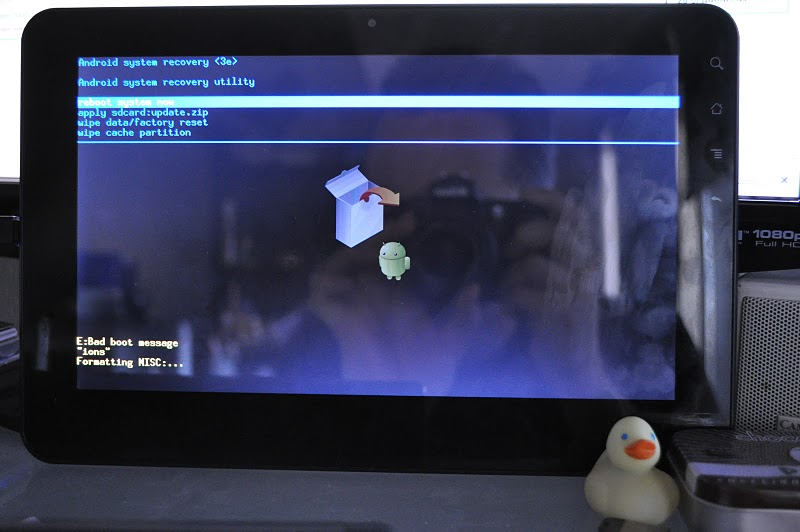
- G-Tab in recovery mode.
- Developer: ViewSonic
- Manufacturer: ViewSonic
- Type: Tablet
- Released: November 1, 2010; 15 years ago
- Discontinued: yes
- Units sold: 200,000 worldwide.
- Operating system: Android 2.2 "Froyo"
- CPU: 1 GHz Nvidia Tegra 2 - Dual-core ARM Cortex-A9 CPU
- Memory: 512 MB
- Storage: 16 GB internal Flash memory (expandable up to 32 GB via SD Card)
- Display: 10.1" TFT-LCD multi touch capacitive screen with LED driver system and 1024x600 resolution
- Sound: Built-in 2 x 1-watt stereo speakers, microphone, headset jack
- Input: Multi-touch screen
- Camera: 1.3 MP AF camera
- Connectivity: Wi-Fi (802.11b/g/n), Bluetooth 2.1+EDR, mini-USB (Host), USB 2.0 (Slave)
- Power: 3,650 mAh battery
- Dimensions: 6.8 in (170 mm) (h); 10.5 in (270 mm) (w); 0.54 in (14 mm) (d)
- Weight: 1.55 lb (700 g)
- Related: ViewSonic Viewpad 10
- Website: web.archive.org/web/20101230063723/http://www.viewsonic.com:80/gtablet/

The ViewSonic G Tablet is an Android-based tablet produced by ViewSonic Corporation, a manufacturer and provider of visual technology. It first appeared for consumer purchase at Sears on 1 November 2010.

At release, it was equipped with Android 2.2 Froyo.

The tablet also features a 10.1-inch (257 mm) TFT-LCD touchscreen, Wi-Fi capability, a 1.0 GHz Nvidia Tegra 2 dual-core processor and 1.3 megapixel front-facing camera.

== Hardware ==
The tablet is enclosed in a black plastic body and weighs a total of 700 g (1.55 lb). The capacitive screen has a 1024×600 resolution and supports multi-touch. The device also has a flash internal storage of 16 GB and can be expanded via a microSD card. Moreover, the tablet comes with two USB ports: one is a USB mini-B 5-pin port, used for connecting the tablet to a computer with the included cable for data transfer; the other is a USB A-type port, used for attaching peripheral devices. In addition to its Nvidia Tegra 2 dual-core 1.0 GHz processor, the ViewSonic G Tablet comes with 512 MB of RAM. It does not support haptic feedback or vibrating alerts.

The tablet has a 1.3 MP front-facing camera for video calling and 802.11b/g/n Wi-Fi and Bluetooth 2.1 + EDR connectivity. It also has a dock port for a future docking station or other accessories. The battery will give it 8 to 10 hours of battery life.

The SMB-A1002 model is manufactured by Malata which is the ODM.

== Software ==
This tablet comes with Android 2.2 (Froyo) with the custom ViewSonic User Interface overlay (TapNTap).

The tablet does not come with Android Market pre-installed and there is no Adobe Flash support out of the box despite having the Adobe Flash logo on the product packaging. However, a statement on the G Tablet's official product page states that "a version of the Adobe Flash Player Application will be available by December 19, 2010.

"Owners of the G Tablet will receive an automatic notice that the plug-in is available for download to further expand their web access and entertainment."

On 23 December 2010, Viewsonic released a software update that allowed use of the standard Android interface.

On April 18, 2011, an update to the G Tablet's software was sent over the air that added the Adobe Flash Player, as well as enabling support for USB peripherals.

The Viewsonic G Tablet is also capable of running later versions of Android. CyanogenMod is a very popular aftermarket firmware available for the G Tablet, and brings it up to Android 2.3 Gingerbread. Other firmware images available for the G Tablet include Flashback, which run Android 3.0 Honeycomb and TeamDRH ICS, which runs Android 4.0 Ice Cream Sandwich. TeamDRH has released their Dirty-Bean ROM, based on Android 4.1 Jelly Bean, which is still considered an alpha release.

== Critical reception ==
The tablet has received largely negative reviews since its release, mainly citing its poor performance on vertical viewing angles and poor user interface. However, reviewers also noted that its relatively low price tag may be a draw for consumers. On 23 December 2010, Viewsonic released a software update that allowed use of the standard Android interface.

== See also ==
- Android Market
- List of Android devices
- List of Android OS-related topics
- List of free and open-source Android applications
- Comparison of tablet computers
- iPad
- Advent Vega
- Samsung Galaxy Tab
- BlackBerry PlayBook
- Archos
- Adam Tablet
