= VT 100 =

VT 100 may refer to

- Vermont Route 100
- VT100 terminal by Digital Equipment Corporation
- the OlivePad VT100, a tablet computer
