= LG Tab-Book =

LG Tab-Book (stylized as TAB-BOOK) is the branding used for personal computers and mobile computing devices produced by LG Electronics running the Windows 8 operating system.

The brand is first used in 2013 in LG's first forray in the Tablet computer market with Windows 8 Operating System. The first products to be introduced under the branding are the LG Tab-Book H160 and the LG Tab-Book Z160 which are both tablet with slide-out keyboard hybrids. Tablet-only versions would also be released under this LG brand in the future.

== Tablets and convertibles ==
- LG Tab-Book H160
- LG Tab-Book Z160

== See also ==
- Optimus, brand used for one of LG's family of Android and Windows Phone-based products.
- G, brand used for LG's family of high-end Android-based products. Spun off from the Optimus brand.
- Tablet for Home Entertainment
- LG Ultra Tab
