= Acer Iconia =

Tablet series manufactured by Acer Inc.

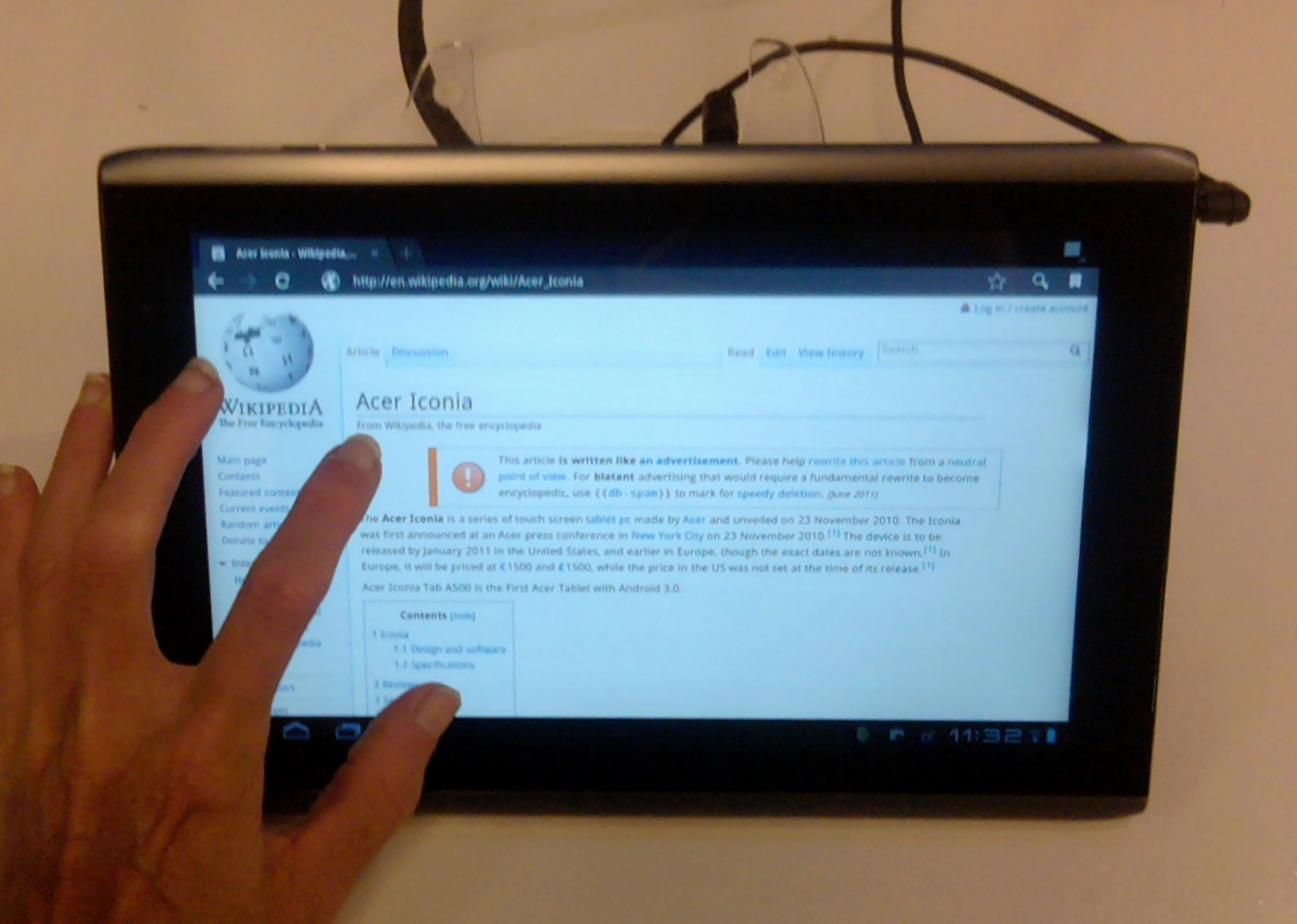
Acer Iconia Tab A500

The Acer Iconia is a range of tablet computers from Acer Inc. of Taiwan.

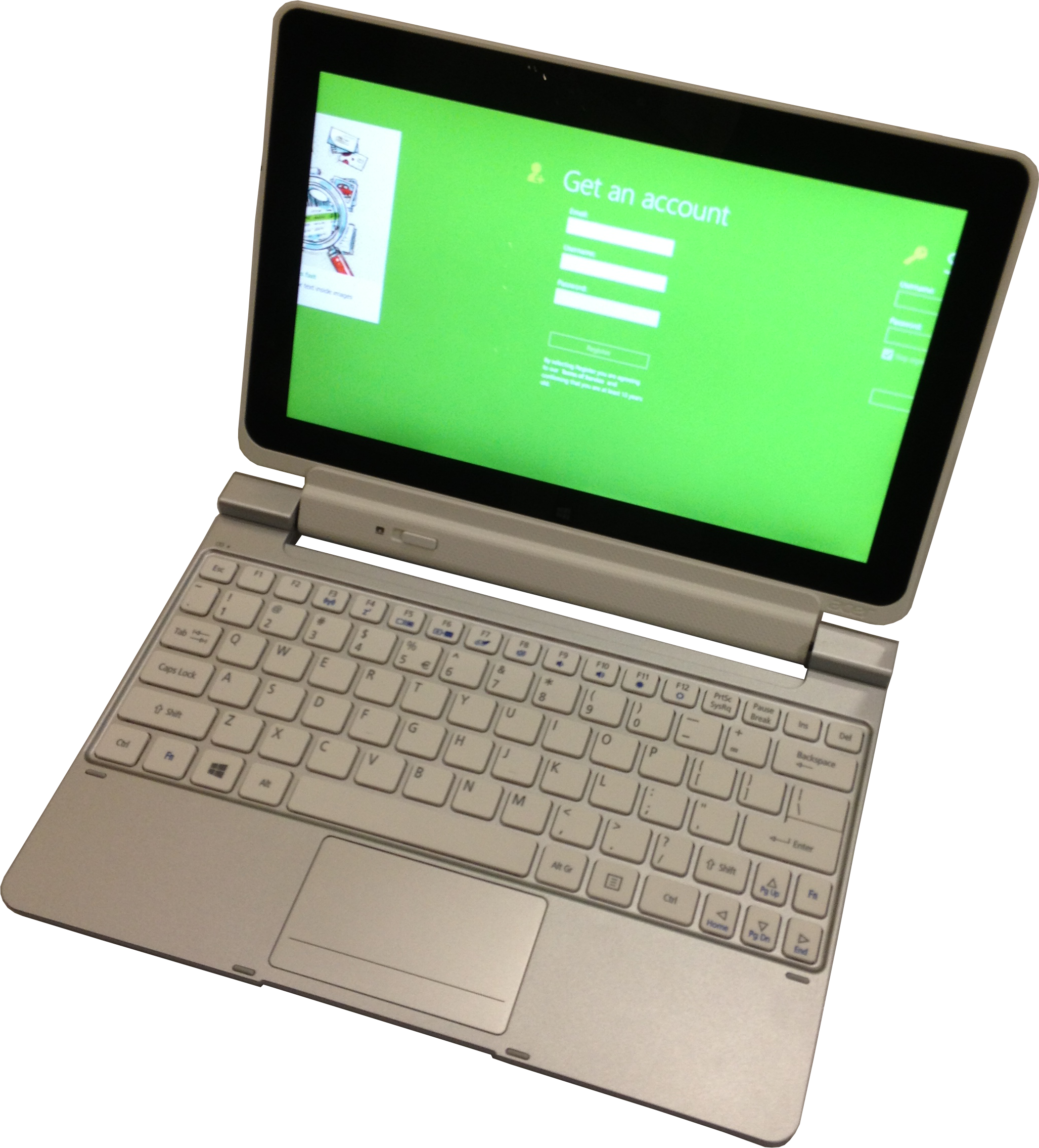
Acer Iconia Tab W5 (with a keyboard)

Acer unveiled its first tablet at a global press conference held in New York on November 23, 2010. The Iconia product line also includes a now discontinued large-screen smartphone named Iconia Smart. The displays in the Iconia series are equipped with Gorilla Glass.

== Iconia series ==
- Iconia Smart – 4.8 in (120 mm) smartphone/tablet - released 2011 - discontinued
- Iconia Tab A100 – 7 in (180 mm) Android tablet - released 2011 - discontinued
- Iconia Tab A500 – 10.1-in Android tablet - released 2011 -discontinued
- Iconia Tab W500 – 10.1-in Windows tablet - released 2011 - discontinued
- Iconia Tab W510 – Windows tablet - released 2011 - discontinued
- Iconia Tab A110 – 7 in (180 mm) Android tablet - released 2012 - discontinued
- Iconia Tab A200 – 10.1 in (260 mm) Android tablet - released 2012 - discontinued
- Iconia Tab A210 – 10.1-in Android tablet - released 2012 - discontinued
- Iconia Tab A510 – 10.1-in Android tablet - released 2012 - discontinued
- Iconia Tab A700 – 10.1-in Android tablet - released 2012 - discontinued
- Iconia Tab W700 – Windows tablet - released 2012 - discontinued
- Iconia W3 – 8.1-in Windows 8.1 slate PC - released 2013 - discontinued
- Iconia B1 – 7 in (180 mm) Android tablet (Jelly Bean 4.1.2) - released 2013 - discontinued
- Iconia A3 – 10.1-in Android tablet - released 2014 - discontinued
- Iconia W4 – 8-in Windows tablet - released 2014 - discontinued
- Iconia One 7 - 7 inch Android tablet - released 2014 - discontinued
- Iconia One 8 - 8 inch Android tablet - released 2015 - discontinued
- Iconia One 10 - 10.1 inch Android tablet - released 2016 - discontinued

=== Iconia Smart ===
This is a tablet with the size of a smartphone: 4.8 in (120 mm) widescreen with a 21:9 aspect ratio and 1024×480 screen resolution. It runs Android 4.0 Ice Cream Sandwich operating system and it is equipped with a 16 MP camera with LED flash plus a 5 MP front camera for video calls.

=== Iconia Tab A100 ===
The Iconia Tab A100 tablet is the smallest tablet in the series. It runs Android 3.2 Honeycomb operating system and it has a capacitive touchscreen display with 1024 x 600 pixel of resolution. Iconia supports multiple connectivity options, including Wi-Fi (in the a 101 version) 3G band and GPS. Iconia tab has gyro-sensor, accelerometer and compass. The A100 features a Nvidia Tegra 2 T20 SoC and a primary 5 MP camera with a secondary 2 MP camera.

Acer has released an update for the A100 to Android 4.0.3 Ice Cream Sandwich.

=== Iconia Tab A110 ===
Released in October 2012, the A110 includes 8 GB of internal flash storage, 1 GB of RAM and a 7-inch 1024×600 TFT multitouch display. Also includes in a front-facing 2 MP camera. Ships with Android 4.0 but can be upgraded to Android 4.1 (Jelly Bean).

=== Iconia Tab A200 ===
Similarly equipped as the A500, the A200 is a budget minded tablet that lacks a rear camera and an HDMI port. Two models offer 8 or 16 GB internal flash storage and 1 GB of DDR2 system memory. It is equipped with a dual-core Nvidia Tegra 2 SoC and features a 1280×800 screen resolution. The A200 features a USB and mini-USB input ports, as well as a MicroSD slot. The device shipped with the Android 3.2 (Honeycomb) operating system.

In February 2012, an update to Android 4.0.3 (Ice Cream Sandwich) was made available via over-the-air update, less than a month after the tablet's release. It comes with Wi-Fi and bluetooth connectivity as well as the standard USB cable connection through the slave USB port which is extra on top of the full sized USB port, allowing direct connection to a PC and a printer or other USB device.

=== Iconia Tab A210 ===
Released in November 2012, its two models offer 8 or 16 GB and 1 GB of DDR3 system memory. Each features a 10.1-inch 1280×800 TFT display and Nvidia Tegra 3 SoC including a quad core 1.2 GHz CPU. And Graphics Coprocessor ULP High Performance 12-Core NVIDIA GeForce GPU. Also includes in a front-facing 2 MP camera. It ships with Android 4.0, but it can be upgraded to Android 4.1 (Jelly Bean). Average battery Life (in hours) 8 hours, number of USB 2.0 Ports 1- USB 2.0 Port 1- Micro USB 2.0 Port MicroSD memory card up to 32 GB, item dimensions L x W x H 10.20 x 6.90 x 0.48 inches, item weight 1.5 pounds, Wireless Type 802.11bgn Bluetooth 2.1+EDR Sensors: G-Sensor, Gyroscope

=== Iconia Tab A500 ===
The Iconia Tab A500 tablet runs Android 3.0 Honeycomb operating system. As of 28 April 2012 the tablet has been updated to Android 4.0 (Ice Cream Sandwich). It is equipped with Nvidia's Tegra 2 processor and is 13.3 mm thick with a 1280×800 screen resolution and 1080p HDMI capacity. It supports Wi-Fi connectivity (The Iconia Tab A501 supports 3G + Wi-Fi connectivity). Iconia Tab A500 tablet also features a 5 MP rear-facing camera plus an HD front-facing camera, for video chat.

Specs:

- 10.1 in (260 mm) TFT LCD LED backlight 1,280×800 resolution
- Nvidia Tegra 250 1 GHz dual core
- 1 GB DDR2 memory & SSD 8–32 GB storage, 64 GB storage available in some countries
- Android 3.0 Honeycomb, upgradable to Ice Cream Sandwich 4.0.3 since April 2012.
- Wi-Fi 802.11 b/g/n and Bluetooth enabled
- HDMI and 1× USB 2.0 ports
- Li-ion 3-cell battery lasts 8–10 Hours. Standby 12–15 days.

=== Iconia Tab A501 ===
Similar to the A500, but with 3G.

=== Iconia Tab A510 ===
The Iconia Tab A510 was shown for the first time at CES 2012. This tablet has been released for pre-order on 22 March 2012.

Specs:

- 10.1 in (260 mm) inch touch screen (max. 10 finger input)
- Nvidia Tegra 3 1.3 GHz quad core
- 1 GB DDR2 memory
- 32 GB storage
- 5 megapixel rear-facing camera
- 1 megapixel front-facing camera
- Android 4.0 Ice Cream Sandwich
- Wi-Fi 802.11 b/g/n and Bluetooth 2.1 + EDR
- HDMI and 1× USB 2.0 port
- Capable of HD games

=== Iconia Tab A511 ===
Similar to the A510, but with 3G.

=== Iconia Tab A700 ===
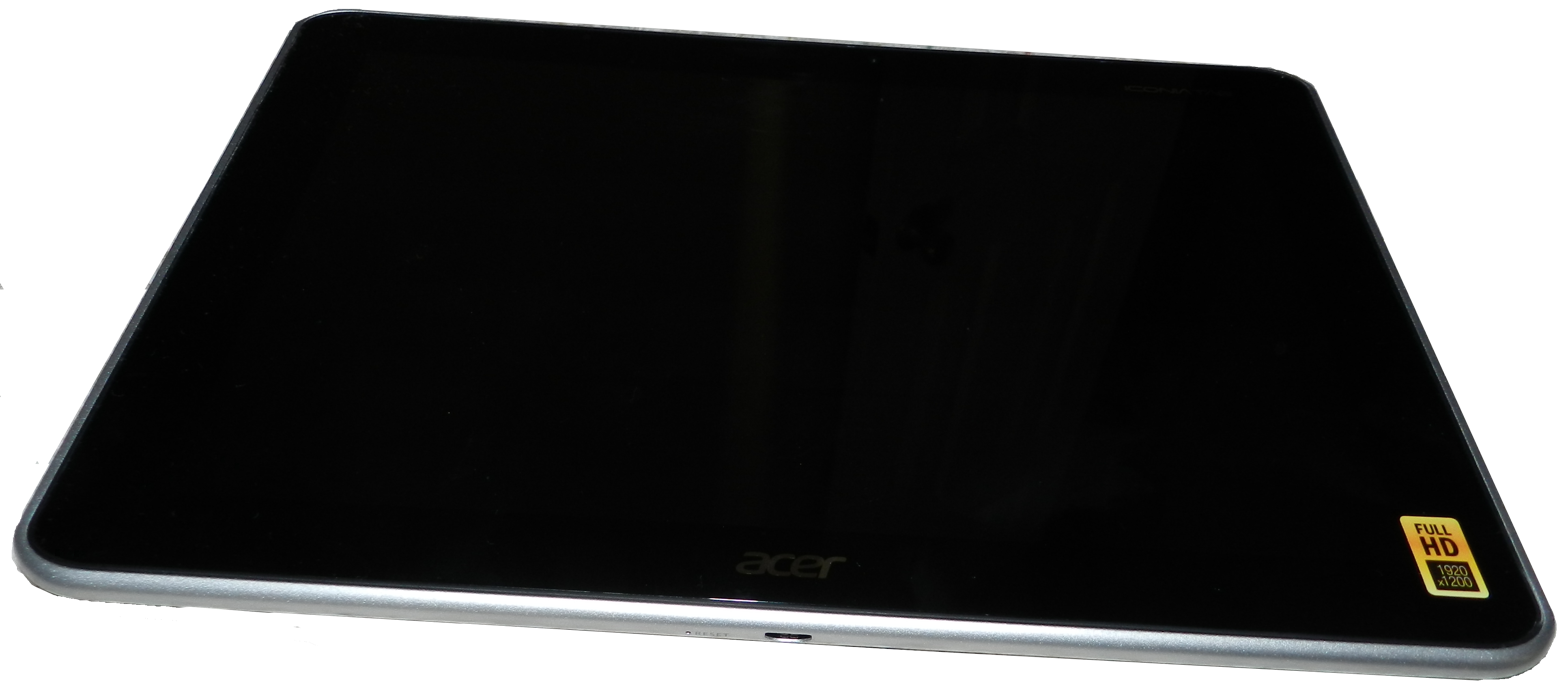
Acer Iconia Tab A700

A Nvidia Tegra 3 T30 tablet with a WUXGA (1920×1200) resolution.

=== Iconia Tab A701 ===
A700 with 3G broadband modem.

=== Iconia Tab 8 ===
The Acer Iconia Tab 8 was announced by Acer on 31 May 2014, as an 8-inch Android tablet featuring an Intel Atom Z3745 processor, 1920x1200 resolution, and 2 GB RAM.

=== Iconia Tab 7 ===
Acer Iconia Tab 7 is a 7-inch 3G Android tablet that has regular phone functionality as well as data transfer. It was announced on 29 April 2014, in New York, and launched in May 2014.

=== Iconia A1-810 ===
In April 2013, Acer announced the first generation Acer A1, which is a 7.9-inch Android tablet with a 1.2 GHz Mediatek quad-core processor and was released in May that same year.

=== Iconia A1-830 ===
In January 2014, Acer announced the second generation Acer A1, which is a 7.9-inch Android tablet that will be released in February 2014, for $149 in the US.

=== Iconia A3 ===
Acer Iconia A3 is a 10.1" Android 4.2 Jelly Bean tablet powered by a quad-core Mediatek processor to be released in November 2013 for $249.

=== Iconia W3 ===
The Acer Iconia W3 was handed out to attendees at the Microsoft Build Conference in June 2013. It was billed as the "world's first 8.1" tablet with Windows 8." It sold for list US$379.99 for the 32 GB version and $429.99 for the 64 GB version. It has since been superseded by the W4. It has an Intel Atom processor Z2760, and runs Windows 8.1.

=== Iconia W4 ===
An 8-inch Windows 8.1 tablet unveiled in October 2013 as a followup to the W3. Powered by a 1.8 GHz Intel Bay Trail processor. 32 GB and 64 GB model options. Also has a 5 megapixel rear camera and a 2 megapixel front camera. is available with HDMI port as well as with micro USB socket. Other competitors are the Dell Venue and Lenovo IdeaTab Miix.

=== Iconia Tab W500 ===
The Iconia Tab W500p runs the Windows operating system, Windows 7 Home Premium to be specific. The tablet is complemented by a full-size chiclet docking keyboard and powered by the AMD Fusion – Brazos chip and features two 1.3 MP cameras. Starting point of the Iconia Tab W500 touch experience is the Acer Ring. It allows to access all features and touch applications pre-loaded. With clear.fi, Acer media sharing system, Iconia Tab W500 can be connected to the home network and can share multimedia content with other clear.fi enabled devices.

Known Models: W500p-BZ412(C50), -BZ467(C50), -BZ607(C60), -BZ841(C60)

Specs:

- 10.1 in (260 mm) TFT LCD LED backlight 1,280×800 resolution
- AMD Fusion C-50 1 GHz dual-core CPU or C-60 dual-core CPU 1.33 GHz
- 2 GB DDR3 onboard memory and SSD 32 GB m-SATA upgradeable storage
- Windows 7 Home Premium 32-bit OS
- Wi-Fi 802.11 b/g/n & Bluetooth enabled
- HDMI, USB 2.0 port
- AMD Radeon HD 6250 Graphics
- Li-ion 3-cell battery lasts up to 6 hours
- Integrated bottom US keyboard Dock

=== Iconia W510 ===
The Iconia W510 is a convertible laptop running the Windows 8 operating system. Using Intel Atom processor Z2760, 10.1 in (260 mm) Acer CineCrystal LED-backlit TFT LCD, Bluetooth, Front and Rear-facing Camera, Audio, Video, 64 GB storage, Wi-Fi, Touchscreen, Intel Graphics Media Accelerator 3650, Genuine Windows 8 32-bit.

=== Iconia W700 ===
Iconia W700 is a convertible laptop running the Windows 8 operating system. Bluetooth, Front and Rear-facing Camera, Audio, Video.

Specs:

- 11.6 in (290 mm) Acer CineCrystal LED-backlit TFT LCD
- Intel Core i3-2375M
- 2 GB DDR3 memory and SSD 64 GB storage
- Windows 8 Home
- Wi-Fi 802.11 b/g/n & Bluetooth enabled
- HDMI, USB 2.0 port
- Intel HD Graphics 3000
- Li-ion 3-cell battery
- Integrated bottom US keyboard Dock

=== Iconia Tab B1 (1st gen.) ===
Acer unveiled the first Iconia B1 in April 2013. It claims that it's a tablet with great specifications for a budget buy; it does keep its word for a decent specification for the price of Rs. 7,999, £99 or US$154. Acer made its first announcement at CES 2013 where it gave a glimpse of its new release of tablets, the Iconia B1 being one of them.

==== Hardware and design ====
The tablet features 1.2 GHz dual core Mediatek processors with a 512 MB RAM and has a 7-inch TFT LCD screen with 1024×600 pixel resolution with a pixel density of approximately 170 ppi. The tablet weighs 320 grams, and has a plastic back cover with a big black bezel. The top of the tablet sports the Acer branding and a VGA camera at the front and there is no rear-facing camera. There is a blue-coloured frame contouring the sides of the tablet.

Also at the back of the tablet, there is an Acer brand mark and speaker grills. There's a Micro-USB port located at the bottom, a slot for a micro-SD card, and a 3.5 mm headset jack that is at the top. The volume rocker and the power or sleep button is also made up of plastic and is located at the right side of the tablet.

==== Software and interface ====
The operating system on the Iconia B1 is Android 4.1.2 Jelly Bean. It doesn't include a custom skin by Acer though they have tweaked the Notification bar. There are 3 onscreen capacitive buttons – for Home, recent apps and back button. In the quick settings area there are options for GPS, brightness, screen timeout, Screen rotation, Bluetooth, Airplane mode, Wi-Fi and shortcut to Settings app which are all located at the top of the notification tray. Users can add up to five customizable home screens with various app shortcuts and widgets that are available along with the stock Jelly Bean and the ones from the Google Play store. The app-launcher allows users to add six apps at a time. The downside is that even with Jelly Bean 4.1.2 and a dual core processor there is a noticeable lag while navigating through the home screens or even switching between the apps, the possible reason could be the RAM which is low with 512 MB, the other could be the type of processor and the materials used to design and fabricate it. There is also that rough touch while swiping through the screens could be the type of glass used and the sensitivity of touch while making the touch screen.

==== Specifications ====
- Android Jelly Bean operating system
- Mediatek dual-core 1.2 GHz processor (MTK 8317T)
- 7-inch diagonal WSVGA capacitive multitouch screen with 1,024×600 resolution display
- 512 MB RAM
- 8 GB of internal storage
- Wi-Fi 802.11 b/g/n
- Bluetooth wireless technology 4.0
- GPS
- 3.5-mm headset/headphone/microphone jack
- Internal speaker
- MicroSD expansion slot with up to 32 GB support
- Front-facing 0.3-megapixel webcam
- Rechargeable 2,710 mAh battery
- Micro-USB (charging and PC connect) with USB 2.0
- Dimensions: 197.4 mm × 128.5 mm × 11.3 mm
- Weight: 320 g

=== Iconia Tab B1-720 (3rd gen.) ===
On 3 January 2014, Acer launched a new Acer Iconia B1-720 that would be released in the middle of February 2014. It features a new 1.3 GHz processor, and an upgrade to 10-point touch screen. The release price is $129 in the United States.

=== Iconia One 7 ===
The Acer Iconia One 7 was launched in June 2014 as an Android 4.4 tablet with an Intel Atom processor, a 7-inch screen and HD display.

The 2015 version retailed for £99 in the UK, with 1 GB RAM and 16 GB storage. The resolution of the IPS LCD screen was 1200x800, lower than competing tablets such as the Tesco Hudl 2.

In early 2018, the Iconia One 7 was available in two models, designated B1–780 and B1–790. Both have a 1.3 GHz MediaTek Cortex-A53 processor, a 1280x720 display, 1 GB RAM and 16 GB storage.

=== Iconia One 8 ===
The Acer Iconia One 8 was released in 2015. It was an Android 5.1 tablet with an 8-inch screen, 1 GB RAM and 16 GB storage. It had a 5 megapixel rear camera and 0.3 megapixel front camera.

In early 2018, the Iconia One 8 was available under designation B1–850. This has the same Cortex-A53 processor as the One 7, a 1280x800 display, a 5 megapixel rear camera and 2 megapixel front camera.

=== Iconia One 10 ===
Released in 2017, the Acer Iconia One 10 has a 10.1-inch screen and an initial retail price of £180 in the UK. It offers Android 6.0, front-firing speakers and 5 GHz Wi-Fi.

In early 2018, the Iconia One 10 was available in two base models designated B3–A30 and B3–A40. Both have a 1280x800 screen, 16 GB storage and similar cameras to the One 8. The A30 model has the same Cortex-A53 processor as the One 8 and 1 GB RAM, while the A40 has a Cortex-A35 processor and 2 GB RAM. A "Full HD" variant designated B3–A40 FHD improves the screen resolution to 1920x1200, runs the Cortex-A35 at 1.5 GHz instead of 1.3, and has 32 GB storage.

=== Iconia Tab 10 A3-A50 ===
Acer Iconia Tab 10 has a 10.1-inch screen. It runs Android 7.0 of which is unveiled back in May 2017. It is the last Acer Iconia device ever released in that decade.

=== Iconia Tab P10 ===
Acer Iconia Tab P10 has a 10.4-inch screen. It runs Android 12, and is powered by the MediaTek MT8183C, up to 4 GB RAM. It is unveiled back in June 2023.

=== Iconia Tab M10 ===
Acer Iconia Tab M10 has a 10.1-inch screen. It runs Android 12, and is powered by the MediaTek Kompanio 500, up to 4 GB RAM. It is unveiled back in July 2023.

=== Iconia X12 ===
The Acer Iconia X12 is a high-end tablet released in early 2025. It runs Android 14 and is powered by the MediaTek Helio G99 processor. It can contain up to 8GB of LPDDR4X RAM and up to 256GB of storage. The Iconia X12 highly markets its large 10,000MAh battery, allowing for up to 16 hours of battery life. It generally receives neutral to positive reviews.

== Reviews ==
Initial reactions saw the devices as an attempt to challenge Apple's iPad. Former Acer Chairman Gianfranco Lanci claimed, in an article in Stuffmideast magazine, that Acer's foray into the world of touchscreen tablets would overtake the Apple tablet within the next 2–3 years.

== See also ==
- Comparison of tablet computers
