= Toshiba Thrive =

Android tablet computer, 2011 to 2012

Toshiba Thrive (AT100)
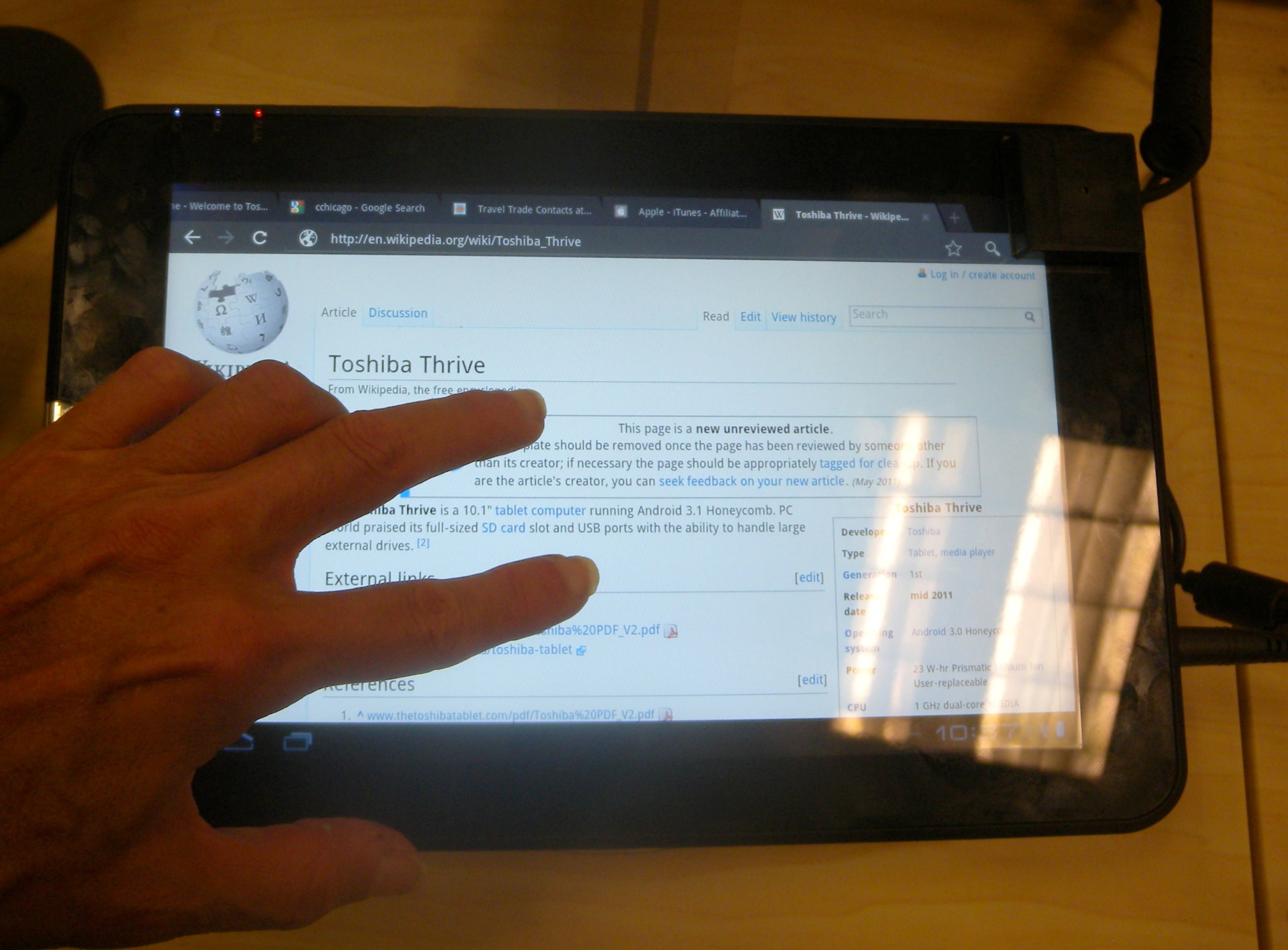
- A Toshiba Thrive displaying this article in browser
- Developer: Toshiba
- Type: Tablet, media player
- Generation: 1st
- Released: July 10, 2011; 15 years ago
- Operating system: Android 4.0.4 "Ice Cream Sandwich" (some models in the USA/Canada) or 3.2.1 "Honeycomb" (other countries)
- CPU: 1 GHz dual-core Nvidia Tegra 2
- Memory: 1 GB LPDDR2 RAM
- Storage: Flash memory 8 GB, 16 GB, or 32 GB
- Display: 10.1 inches (260 mm) 16:10 aspect ratio Resolution: WXGA (1280x800) 151 PPI, HD 720p Wide-Viewing Angle 16:10 Toshiba Adaptive Display Technology Resolution+ Video Upconvert Technology
- Graphics: Nvidia GeForce
- Sound: HDMI, 3.5mm Standard Headphone Jack
- Input: Gyroscope, Accelerometer, Ambient Light Sensor, GPS, E-Compass, USB 2.0, Mini USB, Docking Connector, DC Input, Microphone & SD card reader (micro USB, micro HDMI & micro SD for 7")
- Camera: Front: 2 MP Webcam with Integrated Microphone Back: 5 MP Camera with Auto Focus and Digital Zoom
- Connectivity: Wi-Fi (802.11/b/g/n); Bluetooth
- Power: 23 W-hr Prismatic Lithium Ion User-replaceable
- Online services: Android Market (later Google Play)
- Dimensions: 10.75 in (273 mm) (height); 6.97 in (177 mm) (width); 0.62 in (16 mm) (depth)
- Weight: 1.6 lbs (725 g)
- Related: Motorola Xoom, ASUS Eee Pad Transformer, Samsung Galaxy Tab, iPad 2, T-Mobile G-Slate, Comparison of tablet computers
- Website: www.thetoshibatablet.com

The Toshiba Thrive (AT100 in the UK and Singapore) is a 10.1" tablet computer running Android 3.2.1. PC World praised its full-sized and versatile SD card slot, HDMI port, and USB ports with host functionality and the ability to handle large external drives (up to 2 TB) as well as standard peripherals like USB Keyboards, printers and cameras. The review concluded that there were minor disadvantages including a bulky form and poor sound quality. CNET's review said "Its grooved back, full HDMI and USB support, full SD card slot, and replaceable battery justify its very bulky design."

== Features ==
The Toshiba Thrive has a capacitive touch screen, 10.1 inches diagonally measured, with 1280x800 resolution. It comes with one gigabyte of RAM, and 8, 16 or 32 gigabytes of flash NAND memory. Its CPU is the Nvidia Tegra 2 dual-core mobile processor, capable of common tablet tasks like Android games and other apps, e-books, music, and 720p video. There is a 5-megapixel camera on the back, a 2-megapixel camera on the front, and stereo speakers on the bottom. Users can easily remove the Thrive's back cover and replace the battery (which is not the case with many tablets). Though thicker relative to other tablets, the Thrive has rare full-sized USB and HDMI ports, and an SD card slot. There is a mini USB port for communications with a PC, and a port on the bottom edge for Toshiba's proprietary dock. The USB port is popular for external storage (such as flash drives and self-powered hard drives), mice, and keyboards.

The Thrive was first available online in the US on July 10, 2011. In early 2012, Toshiba quietly (without any press releases) introduced Thrive tablets (16 or 32 gigabytes of storage) with support for AT&T 4G HSPA+ mobile broadband. This capability added $80 to the standard prices.

A Thrive with a 7-inch screen was demonstrated in September 2011 and released in December 2011. It weighs 13.3 ounces and has a smaller form factor, 7.44"x5.04"x0.48". However, the battery is not removable, and unlike the bigger Thrive's connections, it has Micro HDMI and mini USB ports, and Micro-SD slot. It features the same front facing 2-megapixel camera.

== Upgrades ==
There were official announcements about the availability of an upgrade to Android 4.0.4 Ice Cream Sandwich in early 2012, and in June 2012, it became available for certain Thrive models in the US, Canada and Australia. There have been numerous complaints about the stability of the stock release at the Thrive Forum, however. For other countries, the latest official version of Android available from Toshiba for this device is still Android 3.2.1 Honeycomb.

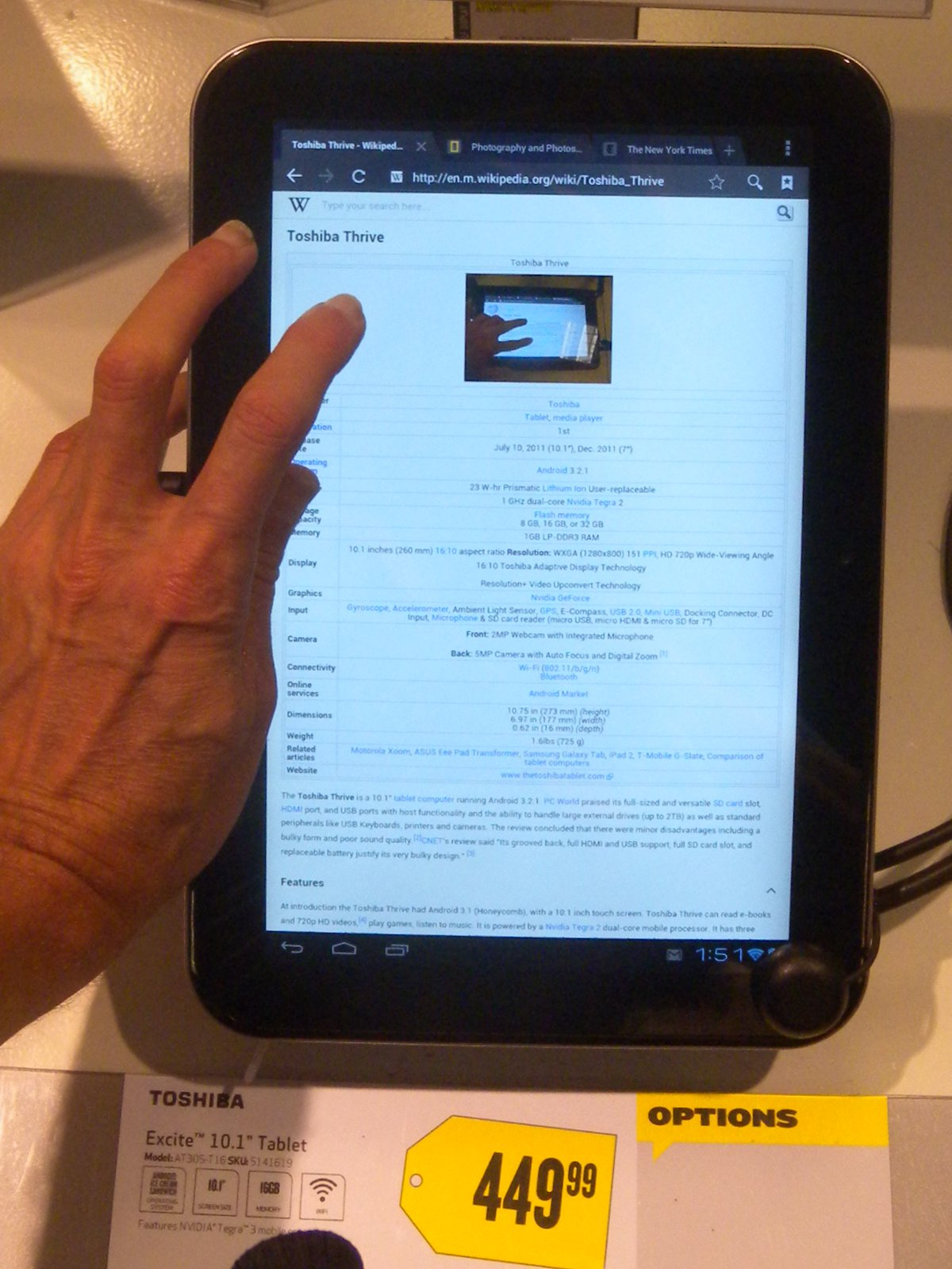
Toshiba Excite

The Thrive is rarely found new from U.S. retail outlets, although refurbished and used units are popular. Toshiba's Excite series of tablets was the successor to the Thrive series, launched on March 6, 2012, with 7.7-inch, 10.1-inch and 13-inch versions. Upgrades to Android 4.0.4 were available in August 2012. The Excite has also been discontinued by Toshiba, with refurbished and used units available from a variety of sources.
