= Motorola Xyboard =

Android tablet developed by Motorola Mobility

Motorola Xyboard / Motorola DROID XyBoard / Motorola Xoom 2
- Manufacturer: Motorola Mobility
- Type: Tablet media player/PC
- Generation: Second
- Released: December 12, 2011
- Introductory price: £380 $529
- Operating system: Android 3.2 "Honeycomb"; Upgradable to Android 4.0.4 "Ice Cream Sandwich" (Wi-Fi only models); Android 4.1.2 "Jelly Bean" (Cellular models)
- CPU: OMAP 4, 1.2 GHz dual-core processor
- Memory: 1GB LPDDR2
- Storage: Internal flash memory: 16/32GB
- Display: 1280×800 10.1” 1280×800 8.2” (Media Edition); IPS panel with Gorilla Glass
- Sound: 3D virtual surround sound
- Input: included stylus: Multi-touch capacitive touchscreen display; Ambient light sensors; Microphone; Barometer; Magnetometer (Compass); S-GPS; 3-axis accelerometer; 3-axis gyroscope
- Camera: Back: 5.0 MP with 4× digital zoom, autofocus, 720p video capture, 30 fps, dual LED flash Front: 1.3 MP camera
- Connectivity: Bluetooth 2.1 + EDR, Class 2; micro-HDMI 1.4 (type D), 720p (out); micro-USB 2.0; Wi-Fi 802.11a/b/g/n
- Power: 7000 mAH Li Ion Rechargeable Battery
- Dimensions: 253.9 mm × 173.6 mm × 8.8 mm 215.9 mm × 138.9 mm × 8.89 mm (Media Edition)
- Weight: 599 grams 386 grams (Media Edition)
- Predecessor: Motorola Xoom
- Website: Official Droid Xyboard 10.1 page specific to the U.S.

The Motorola Droid Xyboard, previously released as the Xoom 2 in Europe before being renamed, is an Android-based tablet computer by Motorola Mobility, announced by Motorola on November 3, 2011.

The device is available in 3G and Wi-Fi variants with there being options between a 10.1-inch screen, 5 MP Camera, 1 GB RAM, 7000 mAh battery or a 10.1-inch screen model.

There is an optional active capacitive stylus available, sold separately.

== Media Edition ==
The Droid Xyboard is also available as a Media Edition. The Motorola website states that the Media Edition will "Stream files from your PC" with "MotoCast™" and has an 8.2-inch "HD widescreen" with "Adaptive virtual surround sound". The Media Edition does not support the active stylus.

== Availability ==
=== UK ===
Both Xoom 2 tablets were released in November 2011, and are available in the UK at Carphone Warehouse, Best Buy, Dixons, PC World and Currys in the United Kingdom.

=== North America ===
The Droid Xyboard was released in some stores on December 9, and was released in all stores on December 12, 2011.

== See also ==
- Comparison of tablet computers
- Droid RAZR
- Android version history
