= OlivePad =

Tablet computer

OlivePad VT-100
- Manufacturer: Olive Telecom
- Type: Internet tablet
- Released: October 28, 2010; 15 years ago
- Introductory price: ₹16,990
- Operating system: Android 2.2
- CPU: 667 MHz Qualcomm M7227
- Memory: 512 MB internal
- Storage: SD card 16 GB, upgrade to 32 GB
- Display: 7" Touch TFT, resolution: 800 X 400, WVGA
- Sound: Bluetooth, speaker, microphone, headset jack
- Input: Touchscreen
- Camera: Rear 3 MP, Front ?
- Connectivity: Wi-Fi 802.11 b/g, USB 2.0, Bluetooth + EDR, 3G, GPS
- Power: Li-polymer, 3,240 mAH
- Dimensions: 179.4 mm (7.06 in) H 110.0 mm (4.33 in) W 11.5 mm (0.45 in) D
- Weight: 375 grams (13.2 oz)
- Website: www.olivetelecom.in/laptop/olivepad

OlivePad VT100 is a tablet computer phone designed and developed by Olive Telecom for the Indian market. It was released on October 23, 2010. It has a dimension of 7-inches with a resolution of 800 x 480 on a capacitive touchscreen supporting multi-touch. The tablet runs the Android operating system (OS) and offers video calling over its 7.2 Mbit/s High-Speed Uplink Packet Access (HSUPA) 3G connectivity, among other features.

== Hardware ==
Powered by an ARM11 600 MHz processor, the OlivePad is based on the Qualcomm MSM7227 chipset, and features 512 MB RAM, 512 MB inbuilt flash memory, and microSD expandability up to 32 GB, aside from a CMOS 3 megapixel camera and webcam. It will be India's first 3.5G tablet with HSUPA support. OlivePad will have quad-band GSM support and also would be available with tri-band WCDMA support.

At the rear of the tablet, there is a 3 megapixel autofocus camera supporting 4x zoom. The tablet also supports Wi-Fi 802.11 b/g, Bluetooth, standard USB 2.0 ports, an added compass, G-sensor, ambient light sensor and dual speakers built-in.

The device supports 720p video playback and has a 3.5-mm jack, supporting 3GP, MP4, Audio Video Interleave (AVI) and MP3 formats. Weighing 375 grams (13.2 oz), the 7-inch tablet has dimensions of 179.4 mm (7.06 in) high, 110.0 mm (4.33 in) wide, 11.5 mm (0.45 in) deep, and a 3,240 mAh lithium-ion polymer battery that gives 16 hours of standby time, and 7 hours of talk time.

== Software ==
The OlivePad runs the Android 2.2 Froyo OS with Android Market support. The OS is not fully standard and is slightly customized. The tablet does not support Flash due to the ARM6 limits.

== See also ==
- Comparison of tablet PCs
- Adam tablet
- iPad
- HP Slate 500
- Sakshat
