= Meebox =

Mexican technology company

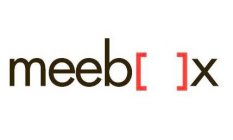
- Type: Public
- Industry: Software, Communication & information-related equipment, Semiconductor, Electronic devices & components
- Founded: 2009; 17 years ago
- Headquarters: Guadalajara, Mexico
- Key people: Carlos Koch (CEO), Hector Ruiz
- Products: Slate
- Website: www.meebox.us

Meebox (also stylized as Meeb[ ]x) was a Mexican company specializing in the design and manufacturing of computers and other consumer electronics. Meebox has operations in Latin America and the United States. It was the first Mexican company to manufacture a full functioned tablet computer. and was one of only three Mexican companies which manufactured tablet PCs. In September 2011, Mexican telecom giant Telmex began selling Meebox tablet computers for use with the Telcel 3G wireless internet network. In 2012, Honda Motor Corporation of Japan began using Meebox tablets and computers for point of sales units and business management, becoming the first major foreign business client of Meebox.

== Products ==
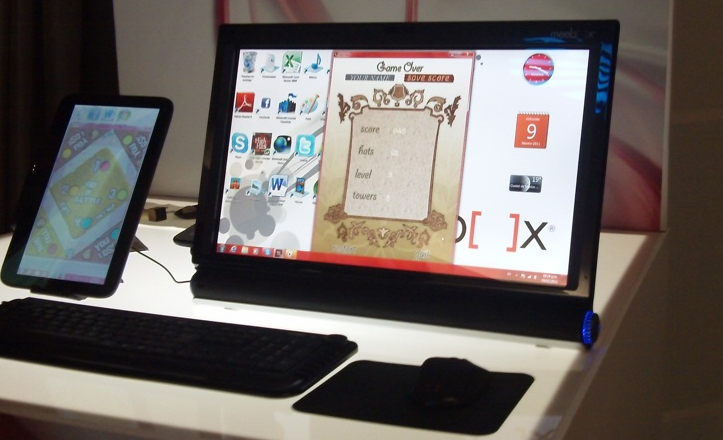
Meebox touch all-in-one, desk top computer with, touch screen, Blu-ray drive, and 500GB hard drive next to a Meebox Slate tablet PC.

Meebox produced a wide range of consumer electronics and parts including, desktop tower units, LCD displays, solar panels, netbooks, laptop computers, webcams, speakers, RAM memory, DVD drives, surge protectors, mice, cables, keyboards, adapters, headphones, and point of sales and display units for commercial clients.

In addition to the aforementioned products, most of Meebox's sales came from its two products: An All-in-one PC, the Meebox touch and a Windows powered tablet pc, the Meebox Slate.
