= Advantech =

Taiwanese technology company

Advantech Co., Ltd.
- Trade name: Advantech
- Type: Public
- Traded as: TWSE:2395
- ISIN: ISIN: TW0002395008
- Industry: Computer hardware
- Founded: 1981; 45 years ago in Taipei, Taiwan
- Founders: K.C. Liu
- Services: Industrial automation solutions; Embedded computing solutions; Industrial IoT platforms; Edge computing systems
- Revenue: US$2.27 billion (2025)
- Operating income: US$0.37 billion (2025)
- Net income: US$0.34 billion (2025)
- Number of employees: 9,044 (2025)
- Website: advantech.com

Advantech (TWSE:2395) is a Taiwanese company that manufactures industrial computing hardware, embedded systems, and Internet of Things (IoT) platforms. Founded in 1981, it is listed on the Taiwan Stock Exchange. It operates through subsidiaries and regional offices across Asia, Europe, and the Americas.

== History ==
Advantech was founded in 1981 and began operations in 1983. In 1985, it introduced PC-based automated testing systems. Its industrial PC, the IPC-600, was launched in 1990. The company expanded into Europe in 1993 through subsidiaries in Germany, France, and Italy. It was listed on the Taiwan Stock Exchange in 1999.

In 2003, Advantech established a manufacturing facility in Kunshan, China. In 2014, it established the Advantech Linkou IoT Campus in Taiwan. In 2016, it acquired B+B SmartWorx for approximately US$99.85 million. In 2018, it opened a service center in Eindhoven, Netherlands. In 2019, it acquired an 80% stake in OMRON Nohgata.

During the 2000s and 2010s, the company expanded into embedded computing, automation systems, and Internet of Things-related technologies through internal development and acquisitions.

The company manufactures industrial PCs, embedded computing boards, industrial motherboards, fanless systems, human-machine interface (HMI) systems, industrial displays, controllers, remote I/O modules, communication devices, and IoT gateways.

== Industrial IoT and edge computing ==
Advantech develops industrial Internet of Things (IIoT) and edge computing systems for data processing, connectivity, and monitoring in industrial environments. Such systems process data near industrial equipment rather than relying solely on centralized cloud infrastructure.

Its hardware products include embedded computing devices, industrial servers, and IoT gateways used in applications such as data acquisition, machine monitoring, predictive maintenance, and industrial automation in sectors including manufacturing, transportation, and energy.

Advantech provides software platforms for device management, system integration, and industrial connectivity. These platforms enable interoperability between industrial equipment and enterprise systems and are used in applications such as machine vision, industrial inspection, robotics, and real-time monitoring.

The company has worked with Intel, NVIDIA, Microsoft, AMD, Qualcomm, and MediaTek on industrial IoT and edge computing systems.

Advantech also uses artificial intelligence workloads on embedded and edge computing platforms, including machine learning inference, real-time data processing, and automated decision-making in industrial environments.

Advantech conducts research and development in embedded systems, industrial automation, edge computing, and related AI applications. Its technologies comply with industrial cybersecurity standards such as IEC 62443 and are applied in machine vision and industrial inspection systems.

Its technologies have been presented at industry exhibitions including Embedded World and Computex Taipei, where applications in industrial automation and edge computing are demonstrated.
