= LG Ultra Tab =

2022 entry-level tablet computer by LG Electronics

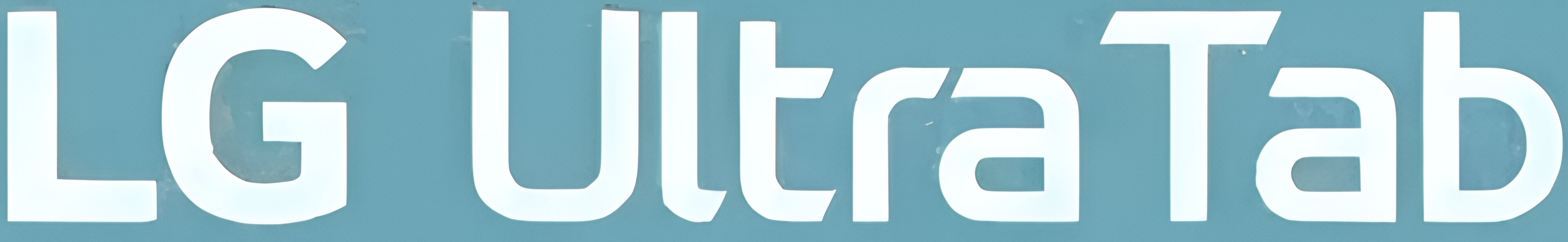
- Brand: LG
- Developer: LG Electronics
- Manufacturer: LG Electronics
- Type: Tablet computer
- First released: 2022: August 5, 2022; 4 years ago 2024: September 2024; 2 years ago
- Form factor: Bar
- Weight: 458 g (16 oz) (1.01 lb)
- Operating system: 2022: Android 12; 2024: Android 14
- System-on-chip: 2022: Qualcomm SM6225 Snapdragon 680 4G (6 nm); 2024: MediaTek Helio G99 MT8781
- CPU: 2022: Octa-core (4x2.4 GHz Kryo 265 Gold & 4x1.9 GHz Kryo 265 Silver); 2024: Cortex-A76 MP2 2.2 GHz + ARM Cortex-A55 MP6 2.0 GHz
- GPU: 2022: Adreno 610; 2024: Mali-G57
- Memory: microSDXC (dedicated slot)
- Battery: 2022: Li-Ion 7040 mAh; 2024: Li-Ion 6000 mAh
- Charging: 16W wired, QC3
- Rear camera: 8 MP, AF
- Front camera: 5 MP
- Connectivity: Wi-Fi 5 Bluetooth 5.1

The LG Ultra Tab is a tablet computer manufactured, developed and designed by LG Electronics and released first on August 5, 2022, and second in September 2024.

This is the first Android-based tablet developed by LG Electronics' BS Business Division and is an entry-level device using the Qualcomm Snapdragon 680 SM6225. It has similar specifications to Samsung's Galaxy Tab A7, A8, and S6 Lite or Lenovo P11 (2021), but uses a relatively new AP, and also supports writing using a Wacom stylus pen.

== History ==
After LG Electronics' MC Business Division was disbanded, tablet development staff moved to the BS Business Division to develop this product, and it was developed using the JDM method by Chinese Wingtech and LG Electronics, which had been collaborating with the existing MC Business Division on the development of entry-level models.

== Hardware ==
- The Wacom stylus pen is a type that uses one AAAA standard battery. It is a bit disappointing that it is not rechargeable, but it is cheaper than the rechargeable pen and can be used for about 15 months with one battery.
- A folio case is included as a basic component, many people say that the keys have a good feel, and it has the advantage of being able to hold the tablet vertically.
- Wi-Fi without 5G or LTE Only the module was loaded.
- The color is excellent, expressing white as white as possible and providing clear and clean image quality. This is very different from the blue or yellow glow of regular low-cost, entry-level displays. In addition, the brightness is 500 nits, which is the brightest among the entry-level models, providing excellent outdoor visibility.
- The speaker quality is somewhat oriented toward mid-range, which provides a good balance when watching a video from the front. Additionally, the quad speakers have ample volume, so the maximum volume is high.

== Software ==
As of the release date, it was equipped with Android 12 as standard. However, it is not equipped with UX 10.0, so it is based on pure Android. However, some parts, such as sound effects, were customized by LG.
