= Acer Clear.fi =

Acer Clear.fi is a wireless home network program by the Taiwanese electronics manufacturer Acer. It allows sharing and playback of media over multiple compatible platform devices. The console can be assembled when the user attaches a wireless router to a DLNA-compliant gadget. When the two are attached, icons will appear onscreen, allowing users to access files through the media console. Acer Clear.fi can also automatically locate Acer smartphones and PCs, enabling users to share media. It was officially presented by the company at a Beijing Conference in May 2010.
