= Advent Vega =

Android tablet computer by Dixons Retail

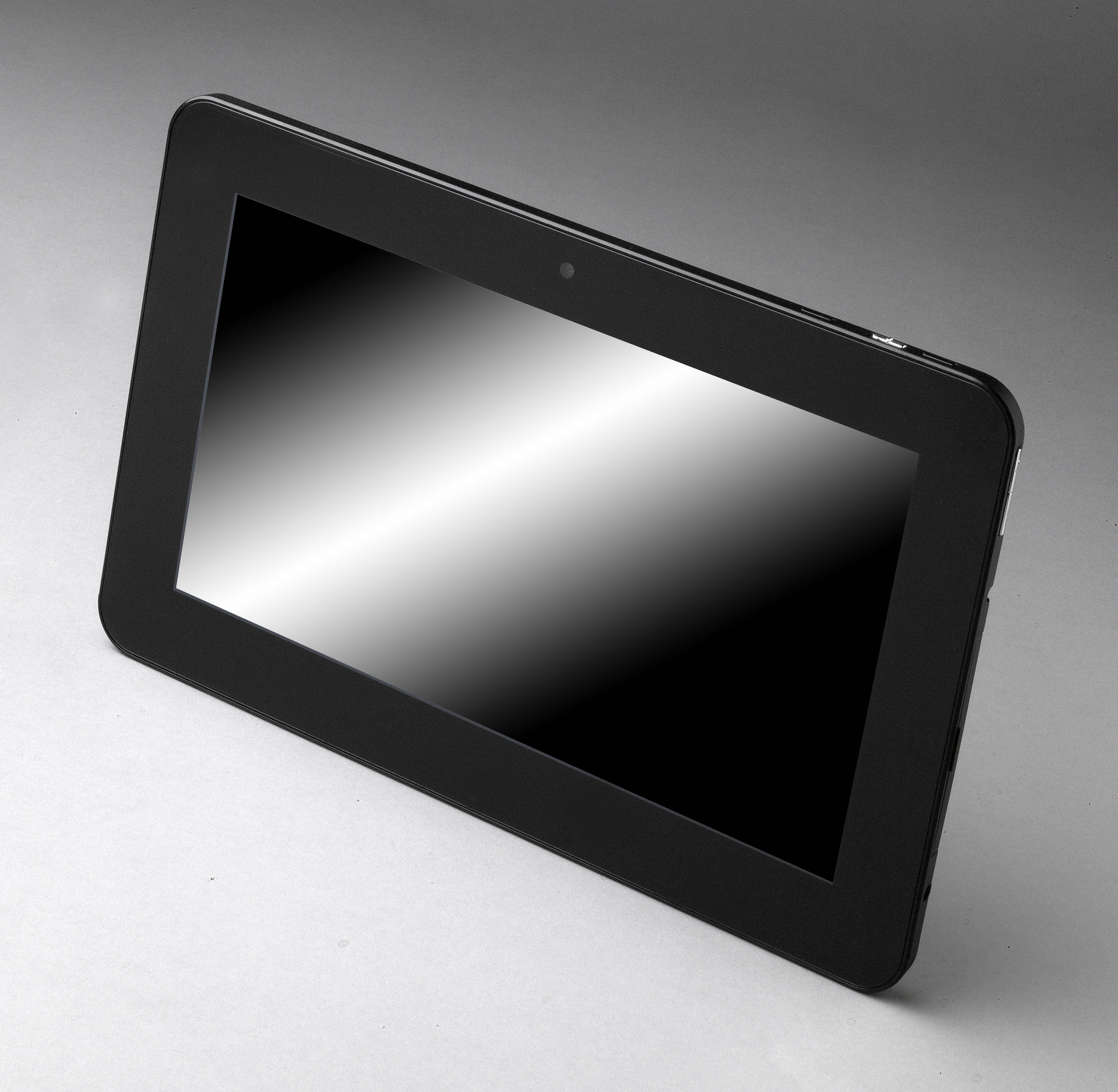
- Developer: Dixons Retail plc
- Manufacturer: Advent
- Type: Tablet media player and PC
- Released: 14 November 2010
- Operating system: Android 2.2 "Froyo"
- CPU: 1 GHz Nvidia Tegra
- Memory: 512 MB
- Storage: Flash memory 512 MB and microSD slot
- Display: 1024 × 600 px, 10.1 in (26 cm) diagonal
- Graphics: ULP GeForce
- Sound: speaker, microphone, headset jack
- Input: Multi-touch screen
- Camera: 1.3 MP AF camera
- Connectivity: Wi-Fi 802.11b/g, Bluetooth.
- Power: 2 cells Li-Polymer battery
- Dimensions: 275 mm (10.8 in) (h); 178 mm (7.0 in) (w); 13.6 mm (0.54 in) (d)
- Weight: 700 g (1.5 lb)

The Advent Vega (also known as P10AN01) is an Android-based compact tablet computer produced by Dixons Retail plc. It features a 10.1-inch (260 mm) LCD touchscreen, Wi-Fi capability, a 1.0 GHz Dual-core ARM Cortex-A9 MPCore processor, and a 1.3 MP front-facing camera. The Advent Vega was released on 19 November 2010 in the UK.

== Hardware ==
The tablet is enclosed in a black plastic body weighing a total of 700 grams (1.5 lb).

The screen has a 1024 x 600 px resolution and supports two-finger multi-touch. It has a flash internal storage of 512 MB and comes with a 4 GB microSD card which can be used to expand its storage.

Its CPU is a 1.0 GHz Dual-core ARM Cortex-A9 MPCore with 512 MB of RAM.

The tablet has a 1.3 MP front-facing camera, 802.11b/g Wi-Fi, Bluetooth 2.1 and EDR connectivity. It also has a HDMI port and USB port, but does not have a Home button and 3G connectivity.

The battery features 6.5 hours of video playback or 16 hours of audio playback time (with the screen powered off). On standby, the battery will last up to four days.

== Software ==
The Advent Vega runs on Google's Android 2.2 Froyo operating system and was never upgraded to newer versions of Android. The installed Android version has been stripped of some functionality compared to similar tablets running on Android 2.2, most notably the absence of the pre-installed Android Market service, which was supposed to be corrected with a future update of Android. The device instead featured the Archos AppsLib store which contains over 5,000 apps.

Several custom ROMs (e.g. Corvus5, MoDaCo) were available to improve the experience on the Vega by giving access to the Android Market. Android 3.2, 4.0.4 and 4.1.2 have been successfully ported to the Advent Vega as "VegaComb", "VegaCream", and "Vegabean" by individuals in the user community, providing access to the Google Play Store, along with full hardware acceleration provided by the Tegra 2 system on a chip (SoC).

== Early impressions ==
The Advent Vega had good first hands-on impressions and was considered a strong rival to other tablet PCs released earlier in 2010, such as the Apple iPad and Neofonie WeTab, considering both the competitive announced price and the later generation dual-core CPU.

Advent also simultaneously released the Advent Amico, a smaller and slower version of the Advent Vega. The tablet ran on Android 2.1 and had an identical look to the Vega but with a 7-inch (180 mm) resistive touch-screen.

== Availability ==
The Advent Vega was added to the Currys and PC World web sites on 19 November 2010. It was also sold in Turkey under the name Exper Easypad. In the Netherlands, as well as in other countries where Point of View operates, released their clone named Mobii 10.1".

== See also ==
- Tablet PC
