= Point of View (company) =

Computer hardware company

Point of View B.V.
- Company type: Private
- Industry: Computer Hardware and Peripherals
- Founded: 2000; 26 years ago
- Headquarters: Eindhoven, Netherlands
- Area served: Worldwide
- Products: Drones; Graphics Cards; Headphones; Tablet PCs
- Number of employees: 40+
- Website: www.pointofview.eu

Point of View B.V. or commonly known as Point of View, POV is a computer hardware company that produces and has produced PCs (including all-in-one systems), tablets, gaming graphics cards/PC cases/mice and mouse pads, quadcopters, smart lights, headphones, and Bluetooth dongles. It was established in the year 2000. POV is based in the Netherlands. The company also includes Point of View Taiwan, Point of View China, Point of View Hong Kong, Point of View France and Point of View United States. Despite being based in the Netherlands, it no longer does business in Europe, as their European branch went bankrupt in 2016.

== Products ==
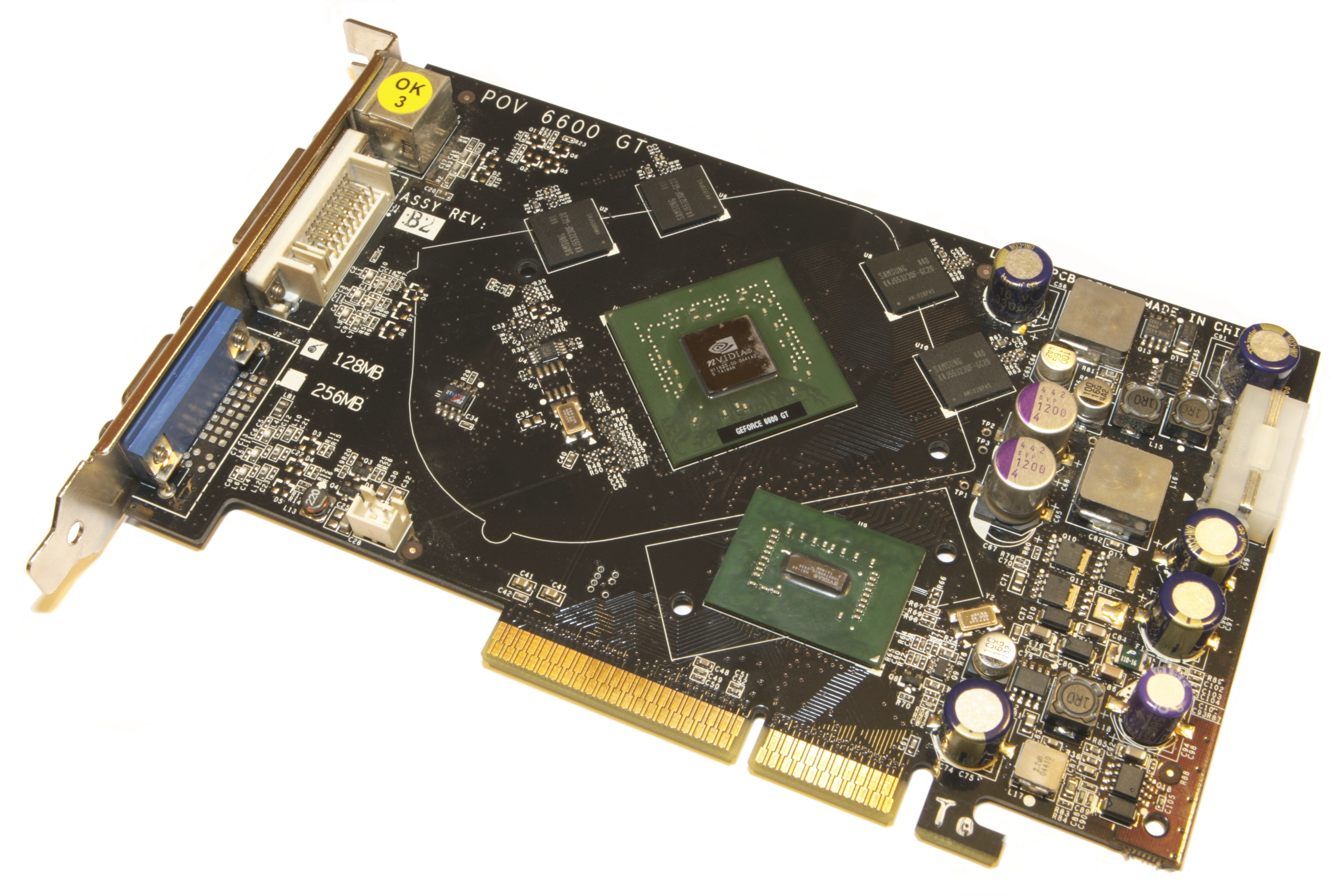
POV NVidia GeForce 6600GT AGP Graphics Card
