= TabletKiosk =

- Type: Private
- Industry: Electronics
- Founded: 2003
- Headquarters: Torrance, California
- Products: Tablet PC and UMPC
- Website: www.tabletkiosk.com

TabletKiosk is a manufacturer of enterprise-grade Tablet PCs and UMPCs located in Torrance, California, United States. All mobile computers produced by TabletKiosk fall into the slate category, featuring touchscreen or pen (active digitizer) input, in lieu of integrated or convertible keyboards. Current products include the Sahara Slate PC i500 series, designed in-house at TabletKiosk's Taiwan R&D facility. Early generations of the eo brand of UMPC (Ultra-Mobile PC) were designed in collaboration with outside designers and the TabletKiosk team, while the fourth generation of this brand, the eo a7400 is designed exclusively in-house.

TabletKiosk is a wholly owned subsidiary of Sand Dune Ventures, based in Torrance, California.

In 2006, TabletKiosk delayed shipment of its "eo" brand tablet after discovering problems with the device's fan.

SoftBrands announced in 2007 that it would use TabletKiosk's Sahara Slate PC line to distribute SoftBrands software to hotel companies.

Parkland Memorial Hospital in Dallas, Texas, United States, has patients visiting its emergency department fill in their details using a TabletKiosk machine.
