= Huawei Ideos Tablet S7 =

Android device

Ideos Tablet S7
- Manufacturer: Huawei
- Operating system: Android 2.1
- Display: 800*480
- Website: https://web.archive.org/web/20110413214710/http://www.huaweidevice.com/worldwide/productFeatures.do?pinfoId=2586&directoryId=2588

The Huawei Ideos Tablet S7 is an Android 3G tablet/phone with a 7-inch touch-screen that has 800*480 resolution, it runs Android 2.1, can connect via Wifi, has stereo sound and a gravity sensor.

It is sold in Australia by Telstra as the T-Touch Tab. It is the cheapest tablet in Australia, according to PC World "the T-Touch Tab is effectively alone as an affordable, entry-level tablet that doesn't skimp on too many features". It is sold exclusively by Telstra for use on the Telstra Next G network.
