= Toshiba Excite =

Excite is an Android based line of tablet computers released in 2013 and designed by Toshiba Corporation.

Excite tablets run on Android Jelly Bean and include Wi-Fi, Bluetooth 4.0, Micro-USB and a MicroSD card slot. As of 2015, there were two models, the 7c and the Go, the later having a slimmer form factor designed for better single hand use. Reception for the Excite has been mixed, with criticism of the low 1024×600 resolution display, and praise for its build quality, performance and price.
