= S-71 Monokhrom =

Russian combat drone

S-71 Monochrom С-71 "Монохром"

General information
- Type: Unmanned combat aerial vehicle
- National origin: Russia
- Manufacturer: Tactical Missiles Corporation
- Designer: United Aircraft Corporation
- Status: In development
- Primary user: Russian Aerospace Forces
- Number built: 2

History
- Introduction date: 2024

S-71 Monokhrom (Russian: С-71 "Монохром") is a Russian air-launched unmanned aerial vehicle (UAV) with the characteristics of a cruise missile.

== History ==
The Sukhoi Design Bureau began work on a new type of UAV in 2019. To facilitate operation and deployment, it was decided to base its design on the concept of a cruise missile dropped from an Su-57 carrier aircraft, where it is carried on AKU-58A or BD3-USK-A booms. Work intensified in 2022 and reached the flight testing stage in 2023. On August 1, 2023, the United Aircraft Corporation filed a patent application for an air-launched UAV with a warhead. It describes an unmanned aerial vehicle capable of operating as a loitering munition or cruise missile. In March 2024, the company received patent number RU2816326C1, and flight tests were completed the same year.

Based on the developed design and the experience gained during its development, an unmanned aerial vehicle designated the S-71M Monochrom was put into production. It is capable of autonomous operation within a designated area, searching for and identifying targets. The S-71 is capable of independently making decisions about and carrying out an attack. Media reports indicate that it has been adapted for launch from the S-70 Okhotnik heavy drone and that a simplified version has been developed, designated S-71K Dyvan (Russian: С-71К «Ковёр»), with low detectability (RCS = 0.007–0.01 m²), capable of covering a distance of 200–350 km at low altitudes of 20–75 m above the ground and 5–15 m above water. The main application of the S-71K is to attack targets with fixed coordinates using a cluster warhead. The drone is manufactured at the Tactical Missile Armament Plant (Russian: «Тактическое ракетное вооружение»).

== Combat use ==
The first combat use took place during Russo-Ukrainian war. Russian media reported that in January 2026, near the village of Khlopyaniki, S-71 drones destroyed a HIMARS missile launcher that was participating in an attack on targets in the Bryansk Oblast.

== Design ==
The drone is built in a standard aircraft configuration, designed to reduce its radar signature. The fuselage is hexagonal in cross-section and terminated with a V-tail. It is powered by a TRDD-50 (Russian: ТРДД-50) turbojet engine or its modification, enabling sustained subsonic flight at low altitudes. The engine's exhaust nozzle is designed to reduce its thermal signature. The drone is armed with a 100-150 kg high-explosive fragmentation warhead. It is equipped with an inertial guidance system and a GLONASS satellite navigation module. The wings are foldable and deploy after airdrop. The S-71M's size allows four S-71Ks to be carried in the Su-57's internal bay; the S-71K must be carried on under-wing weapons mounts. The Su-57 can carry four S-71Ks.

Remains of a destroyed S-71M, recovered by Ukrainian forces in mid 2026, showed that it was controlled by a Nvidia Jetson Orin NX, produced in March 2025, the most powerful board found on a Russian weapon used in Ukraine so far. Comparable with the performance of a GeForce-series RTX 3000 graphic card.
