= Toshiba AC100 =

Laptop computer

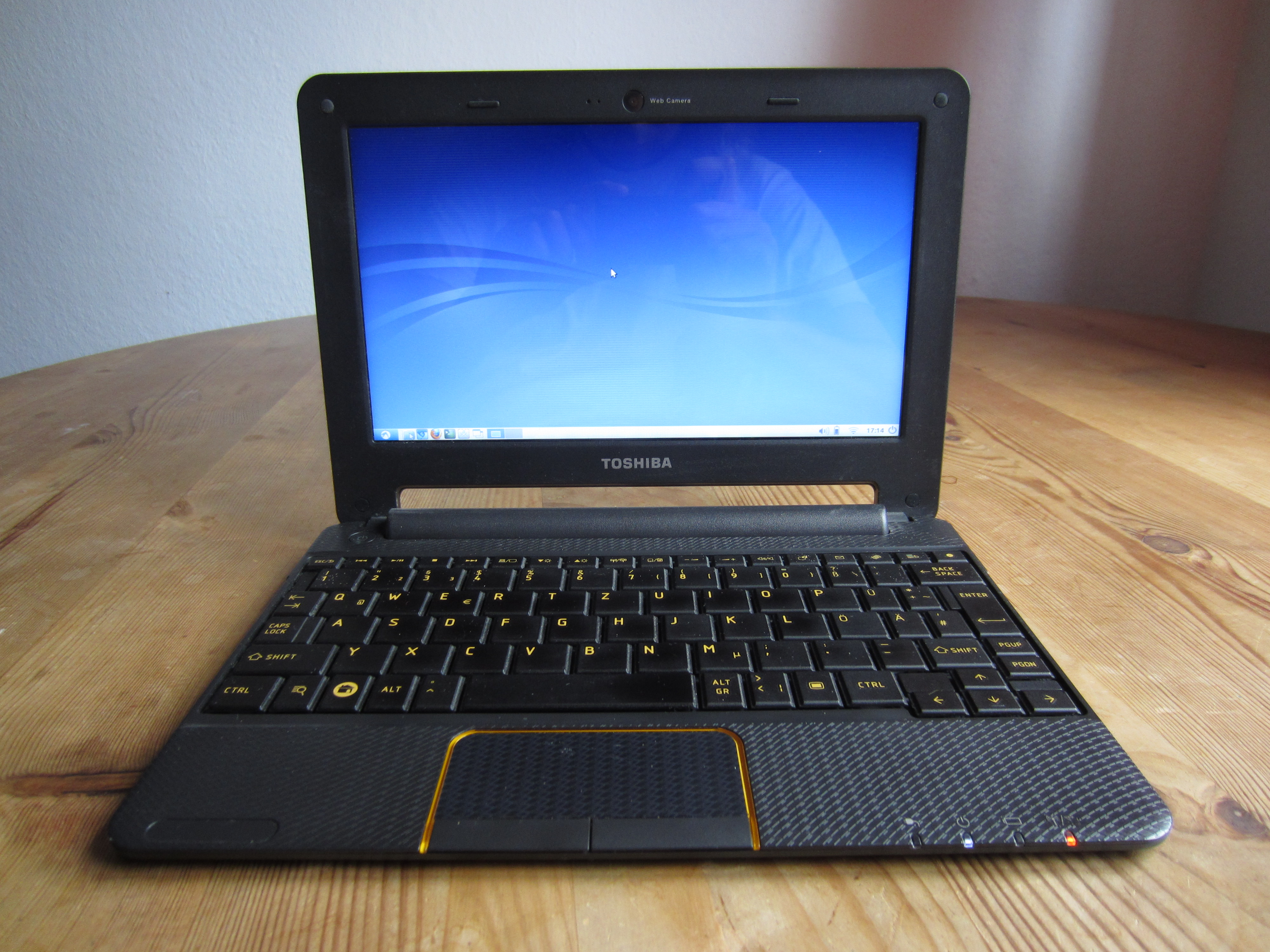
- Toshiba AC100
- Manufacturer: Toshiba
- Type: Smartbook
- Media: SDHC/SDIO reader
- Operating system: Android, Linux-based custom
- System on a chip: Tegra 2 250 T20 "Harmony"
- CPU: ARM dual-core 1GHz Cortex-A9 processor
- Memory: 512 MB
- Storage: 8 - 32 GB eMMC chip
- Display: 10.1 in (260 mm) diagonal 1024 × 600 LED backlit LCD
- Graphics: 333MHz ULP GeForce with shared system memory (64MB default)
- Sound: internal microphone, mono speaker, stereo output
- Input: Keyboard; Touchpad
- Camera: 1.3 MP
- Connectivity: WLAN 802.11 b/g/n 3G Quadband WCDMA/GSM + SIM card slot 1×USB 2.0 mini HDMI connector 3.5 mm stereo out Electret microphone
- Power: 7 hours battery life
- Weight: 870 gramms

Toshiba AC100 (or Dynabook AZ in Japan, code named Paz00 by Compal) is a smartbook device from Toshiba that was announced in June 2010.

== Technical details ==
=== Hardware ===
The mainboard is derived from the Nvidia Tegra Harmony reference board.

The main CPU is a Tegra 250 SoC which consists of:

- Dual-core 1 GHz Cortex-A9 processor, 1 MB L2 cache
- ULP (Ultra Low Power) GeForce GPU
- DDR2 controller, 512 MB RAM (256 + 256 MB chips)
- Dual-display controller (LVDS + HDMI)
- JPEG encoder/decoder
- Video encode/decoder
- Sound chip

It is able to remain in stand-by mode for up to 7 days.

Supplemental chips are (among others)

- Embedded flash (type depends on the model, e.g. Toshiba THGBM2G7D4FBAI9)
- Embedded controller (ENE KB926QF-D3?)
- Power management unit TPS658622A
- Wi-Fi (Ralink/MSI RT3070STA)
- Bluetooth chip (optional)
- 3G modem (optional, Ericsson Business Mobile Networks BV F3307 Mobile Broadband Module)

=== Software ===
It is supported in the Linux kernel through a device tree file.

The AC100 is the reference device for the Ubuntu ARM port.

OS is Android v2.1 (upgradable to v2.2 since 2011).

== Availability ==
The device was officially available at the Toshiba United Kingdom site.

The AC100 was discontinued in 2011 and is no longer being manufactured.

== Reception ==
TechRepublic listed the AC100 as one of the 25 "unique and bizarre breakthroughs" in laptop innovation, because it was one of the first laptops that ran Android.
