= Vibrante =

Linux distribution by Nvidia

- Developer: Nvidia
- OS family: Unix-like
- Working state: Current
- Source model: Open source
- Initial release: 2010; 16 years ago
- Kernel type: Monolithic (Linux)

Vibrante is a Linux distribution created by Nvidia and used for at least their Drive PX 2 platform series. The name is listed as a registered trademark of Nvidia. First appearances of the name were seen in about the year 2010 when it labeled some rather universal multimedia engine including audio, video and 3D building display that was in tight cooperation with Audi company.

At NVidia TechDay in December 2015, the distribution was reported with version numbers 3.0 for Jetson TK1 Pro (aka. X3) and Drive CX, and with version 4.0 for Drive CX and PX platforms. Jetson TK1 is mentioned as running with the Linux4Tegra package instead. Companies like Toradex have built and published e.g. sample application codes on top of it. Abbreviations of Vibrante Linux like V3L, V3Le or V4L with the number representing the version plus terms like L4T (Linux4Tegra, a supposed sibling) and assigned to certain devices can be found in some history and release docs, e.g. for Nvidia VisionWorks. On top of Vibrante it is possible to run Nvidias VisionWorks Toolkit. Vibrante is one of the targets that OpenCV4Tegra (OpenCV for Tegra; an OpenCV derivate with Tegra-specific optimizations) can run upon. Further there is the Nvidia PerfKit Package that copes with Vibrante.

== Spin offs ==
It seems that Vibrante Linux was used to derive a QNX-based version, thus probably using the QNX kernel as the base system along with several higher level software components (e.g. from GNU and other sources) as already present from the Vibrante Linux environment. Namely the package qnx-V3Q-23.16.01 is reported to run on the Nvidia Jetson TK1 Pro board.

== Usage ==
At CES 2010 it was announced that Nvidia would be introducing its GPUs to all 2010 Audi vehicles, to power its third generation MMI. 3G MMI used Vibrante as its multimedia engine to deliver in car entertainment.
