= Nvidia Jetson =

Series of embedded computing boards by Nvidia

Nvidia Jetson is a series of embedded computing boards from Nvidia. The Jetson TK1, TX1 and TX2 models all carry a Tegra processor (or SoC) from Nvidia that integrates an ARM architecture central processing unit (CPU). Jetson is a low-power system and is designed for accelerating machine learning applications.

== Hardware ==
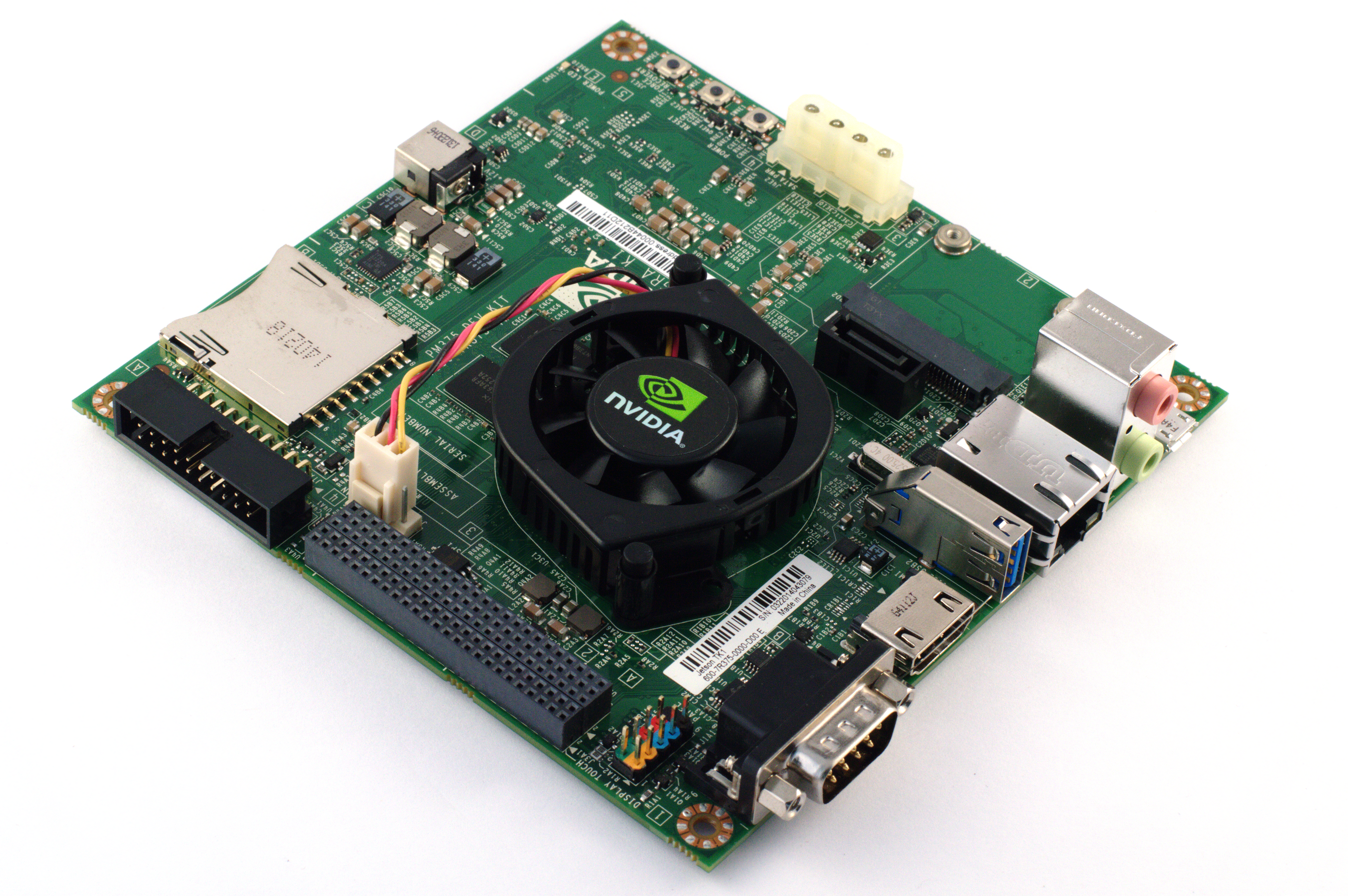
Nvidia Jetson TK1

The Jetson family includes the following boards:

- In late April 2014, Nvidia shipped the Nvidia Jetson TK1 development board containing a Tegra K1 SoC in the T124 variant and running Ubuntu Linux.
- The Nvidia Jetson TX1 development board bears a Tegra X1 of model T210.
- The Nvidia Jetson TX2 board bears a Tegra X2 of microarchitecture GP10B (SoC type T186 or very similar). This board and the associated development platform was announced in March 2017 as a compact card design for low power scenarios, e.g. for the use in smaller camera drones such as the Skydio 2. A matrix describing a set of performance modes was provided by the media along with that. Further a TX2i variant, said to be rugged and suitable for industrial use cases, is mentioned.
- The Nvidia Jetson Xavier was announced as a development kit in end of August 2018. Indications were given that a 20x acceleration for certain application cases compared to predecessor devices should be expected, and that the application power efficiency is 10x improved. Nvidia Jetson Xavier NX has a 6-core Nvidia Carmel ARMv8.2.
  - The Nvidia Jetson AGX Xavier is the 8-core version on the same core architecture (Carmel Armv8.2).

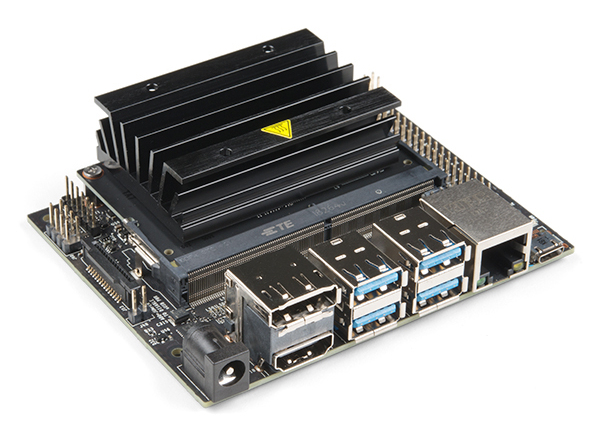
An Nvidia Jetson Nano developer kit

- The Nvidia Jetson Nano was announced as a development system in mid-March 2019 The intended market is for hobbyist robotics due to the low price point. The final specs expose the board being sort of a power-optimized, stripped-down version of what a full Tegra X1 system would mean. Only half of the CPU (only 4x A57 @ 1.43 GHz) and GPU (128 cores of Maxwell generation @ 921 MHz) cores are present and only half of the maximum possible RAM is attached (4 GB LPDDR4 @ 64 bit + 1.6 GHz = 25.6 GB/s) whilst the available or usable interfacing is determined by the baseboard design and is further subject of implementation decisions and specifics in an end user specific design for an application case.
  - The Nvidia Jetson Nano Developer Kit.

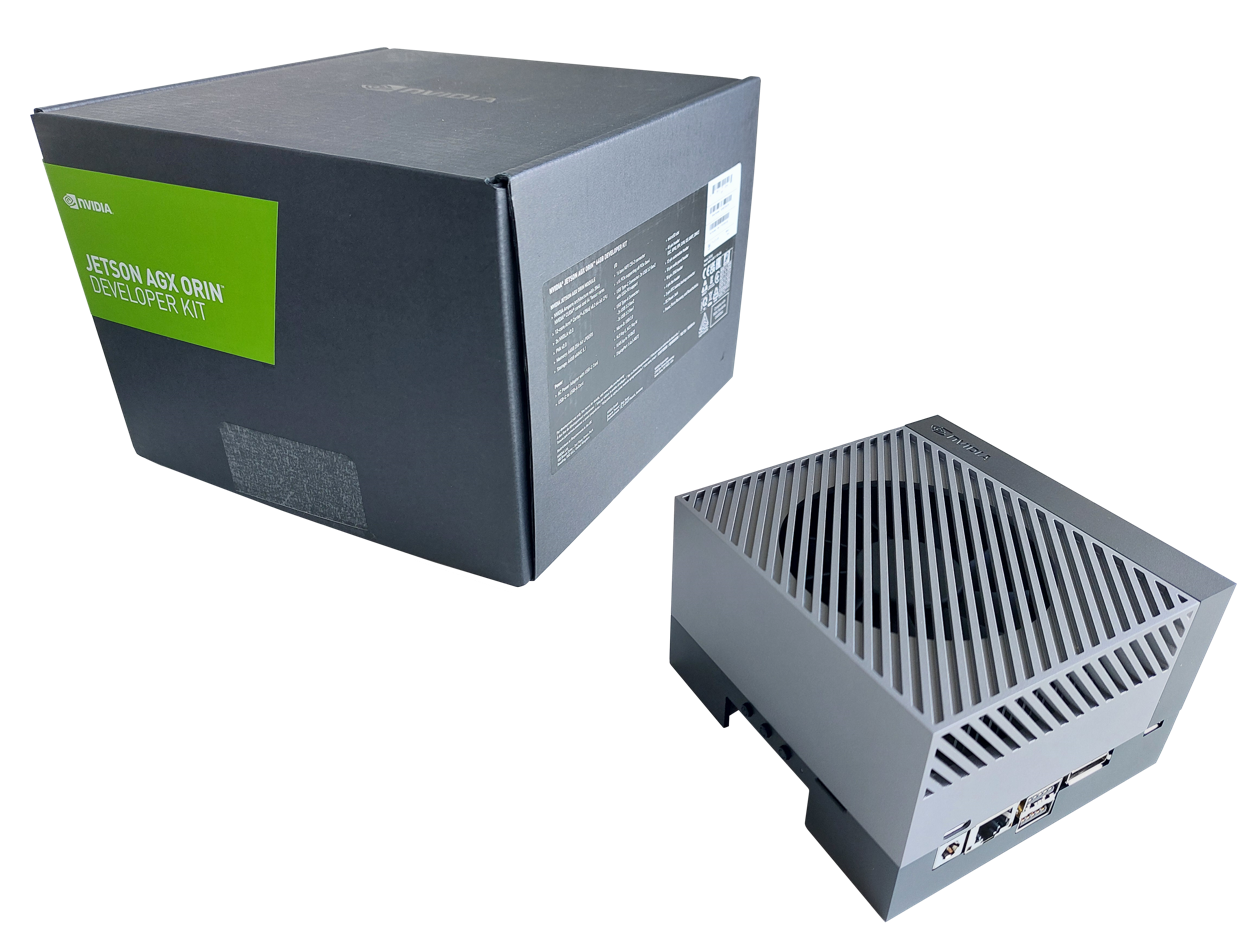
An Nvidia Jetson Orin developer kit

- In September 2022 Nvidia announced the Jetson Orin Nano. The modules have the same 260-pin SO-DIMM connector and 69.6 mm x 45 mm dimensions, and come in two variants. The 4 GB variant provides 20 Sparse or 10 Dense TOPs, using a 512-core Ampere GPU with 16 Tensor cores, while the 8 GB variant doubles those numbers to 40/20 TOPs, a 1024-core GPU and 16 Tensor cores. Both have 6 Arm Cortex-A78AE cores. The 4 GB module starts at $199 and the 8 GB variant for $299, when purchasing 1000 units.
- In December 2024, Nvidia announced the updated Orin Nano with a claimed 1.7x performance improvement and a price reduction of the development kit from $499 to $249
- In August 2025, the Jetson AGX Thor was released. It features 128 GiB memory and a Blackwell GPU capable of 2,070 FP4 TFLOPS. Nvidia claims the AGX Thor delivers 7.5x more computing power and 3.5x the efficiency compared to the previous generation Orin.

== Performance ==
There are various versions of the Jetson board available.

Year	Name	Performance	GPU	DLA	CPU	Memory	Power
2014	Jetson TK1	0.327 Dense FP32 Total TFLOPS	192-core Nvidia Kepler architecture GPU	—N/a	Quad-core ARM Cortex-A15 processor	2 GiB	10 W
2015	Jetson TX1	1.024 Dense FP16 TFLOPS	256-core Nvidia Maxwell architecture GPU	—N/a	Quad-core ARM Cortex-A57 MPCore processor	4 GiB	10 W
2017	Jetson TX2	1.333 Dense FP16 TFLOPS	256-core Nvidia Pascal architecture GPU	—N/a	Dual-core Nvidia Denver 2 64-bit CPU and quad-core ARM Cortex-A57 MPCore processor	8 GiB	7.5–15 W
2018	Jetson AGX Xavier	30-32 Dense INT8 Total TOPS	512-core Nvidia Volta architecture GPU with 64 Tensor cores	2	8-core NVIDIA Carmel ARMv8.2 64-bit CPU 8MB L2 + 4MB L3	32–64 GiB	10-40 W
2019	Jetson Nano	0.472 Dense FP16 TFLOPS	128-core Nvidia Maxwell architecture GPU	—N/a	Quad-core ARM Cortex-A57 MPCore processor	4 GiB	5–10 W
2020	Jetson Xavier NX	21 Dense INT8 Total TOPS	384-core Nvidia Volta architecture GPU with 48 Tensor cores	2	6-core Nvidia Carmel ARMv8.2 64-bit CPU 6MB L2 + 4MB L3	8 GiB	10–20 W
2023	Jetson Orin Nano	34–67 Sparse INT8 TOPS	up to 1024-core Nvidia Ampere architecture GPU with 32 Tensor cores	—N/a	6-core ARM Cortex-A78AE v8.2 64-bit CPU 1.5MB L2 + 4MB L3	4–8 GiB	7–25 W
2023	Jetson Orin NX	117–157 Sparse INT8 Total TOPS	1024-core Nvidia Ampere architecture GPU with 32 Tensor cores	1-2	up to 8-core ARM Cortex-A78AE v8.2 64-bit CPU 2MB L2 + 4MB L3	8–16 GiB	10–40 W
2023	Jetson AGX Orin	200-275 Sparse INT8 Total TOPS	up to 2048-core Nvidia Ampere architecture GPU with 64 Tensor cores	2	up to 12-core ARM Cortex-A78AE v8.2 64-bit CPU 3MB L2 + 6MB L3	32–64 GiB	15–60 W
2025	Jetson AGX Thor	2,070 FP4 TFLOPS	2560-core Nvidia Blackwell architecture GPU with 96 Tensor cores	—N/a	14-core ARM Neoverse-V3AE 64-bit CPU 1MB L2 + 16MB L3	128 GiB	130 W

=== Maxwell architecture ===
The published operation modes of the Nvidia Jetson Nano are:

Mode	0	1
GPU clock (MHz)	921	640
Cortex-A57 (MHz)	4x 1428	2x 918; 2x stopped
TDP (W)	10	5

=== Pascal architecture ===
Jetson TX2 Series Comparison Table
Product Name	GPU Performance Dense Tensor FP16 TFLOPS	Memory GB	Storage GB	Power W
Jetson TX2 NX	1.33	4	16	7.5, 15
Jetson TX2 4GB	1.33	4	16	7.5, 15
Jetson TX2i	1.26	8	32	10, 20
Jetson TX2	1.33	8	32	7.5, 15

The published performance modes of the Nvidia Jetson TX2 are as follows.

Mode	Max Clocks (Denver 2 + A57)	Max-P (Denver 2 + A57)	Max-P (only Denver 2)	Max-P (only A57)	Max-Q (only A57)
GPU clock (MHz)	1302	1122			854
Denver 2 clock (MHz)	2000	1400	2000	stopped	stopped
Cortex-A57 (MHz)	2000+	1400	stopped	2000	1200
TDP (W)	might vary	15	15	15	7.5

Jetson TX2 also has 5 power modes, numbered 0 through 4 as published by NVIDIA. The default mode is mode 3 (MAX-P).

Jetson TX2 clock configuration with power modes
Property	MAX-N (Mode 0)	MAX-Q (Mode 1)	MAX-P (Mode 2)	MAX-P* (Mode 3)	MAX-P (Mode 4)
Power budget	N/A	7.5W	15W	15W	15W
Online A57 CPU	4	4	4	4	1
Online D15 CPU	2	0	2	0	1
A57 CPU max freq (MHz)	2000	1200	1400	2000	345
D15 CPU max freq (MHz)	2000	N/A	1400	N/A	2000
GPU max freq (MHz)	1300	850	1122	1122	1122
Memory max freq (MHz)	1866	1331	1600	1600	1600

=== Volta architecture ===
Jetson Xavier Series Comparison Table
Product Name	GPU Performance Dense Tensor INT8 TOPS	DLA Performance Dense Tensor INT8 TOPS	Memory GB	Storage GB	Power W
Jetson Xavier NX	13	8	8	16	10, 15, 20
Jetson Xavier NX 16GB	13	8	16	16	10, 15, 20
Jetson AGX Xavier	22	10	32	32	10, 15, 30
Jetson AGX Xavier Industrial	20	10	32	32	20, 40
Jetson AGX Xavier 64GB	22	10	64	64	10, 15, 30

=== Ampere architecture ===
Jetson Orin Series Comparison Table
Product Name	GPU Performance Dense Tensor INT8 TOPS	DLA Performance Dense Tensor INT8 TOPS	Memory GB	Storage GB	Power W
Jetson Orin Nano 4GB	17	—N/a	4	—N/a	7, 10, 25
Jetson Orin Nano 8GB	33	—N/a	8	—N/a	7, 15, 25
Jetson Orin NX 8GB	38	20	8	—N/a	10, 15, 25, 40
Jetson Orin NX 16GB	38	40	16	—N/a	10, 15, 25, 40
Jetson AGX Orin 32GB	54	46	32	64	15, 40
Jetson AGX Orin Industrial	78	46	64	64	15, 75
Jetson AGX Orin 64GB	85	52.5	64	64	15, 60

== Software ==
Various operating systems and software might be able to run on the Jetson board series.

=== Linux ===
JetPack is a software development kit (SDK) from Nvidia for their Jetson board series. It includes the Linux for Tegra (L4T) operating system and other tools. The official Nvidia download page bears an entry for JetPack 3.2 (uploaded there on 2018-03-08) that states:

JetPack 3.2 adds support for the Linux for Tegra r28.2 image for the Jetson OS. It is packaged with newer versions of Tegra System Profiler, TensorRT, and cuDNN from the last release.

RedHawk Linux is a high-performance RTOS available for the Jetson platform, along with associated NightStar real-time development tools, CUDA/GPU enhancements, and a framework for hardware-in-the-loop and man-in-the-loop simulations.

=== QNX ===
The QNX operating system also available for the Jetson platform, though it is not widely announced. There are success reports of installing and running specific QNX packages on certain Nvidia Jetson board variants. Namely the package qnx-V3Q-23.16.01 that is seemingly in parts based on Nvidia's Vibrante Linux distribution is reported to run on the Jetson TK1 Pro board.

== Reported military and export-control issues ==
In August 2026, Ukrainian military intelligence alleged that a Jetson Orin module was present in Russia's S-71 'Monochrome' cruise missile, though Nvidia stated the product is not export-controlled and not officially sold in Russia.

The module in question is reportedly an Orin NX 8GB/16GB, rated up to 157 sparse INT8 TOPS on an Ampere-architecture GPU with 1024 CUDA cores, and has been shipping commercially since 2023.

The specific module (Orin NX 8GB/16GB), its spec (up to 157 sparse INT8 TOPS, Ampere GPU, 1024 CUDA cores), and shipping history (available since 2023).

== See also ==
- Computer vision
- Raspberry Pi
- Movidius neural compute stick
