= Project Denver =

Microarchitecture by Nvidia

Nvidia Denver 1/2
General information
- Launched: 2014 (Denver); 2016 (Denver 2)
- Designed by: Nvidia

Physical specifications
- Cores: 2

Cache
- L1 cache: 192 KiB per core (128 KiB I-cache with parity, 64 KiB D-cache with ECC)
- L2 cache: 2 MiB @ 2 cores

Architecture and classification
- Technology node: 28 nm (Denver 1) to 16 nm (Denver 2)
- Instruction set: ARMv8-A

Nvidia Carmel
General information
- Launched: 2018
- Designed by: Nvidia
- Max. CPU clock rate: to 2.3 GHz

Physical specifications
- Cores: 2

Cache
- L1 cache: 192 KiB per core (128 KiB I-cache with parity, 64 KiB D-cache with ECC)
- L2 cache: 2 MiB @ 2 cores
- L3 cache: (4 MiB @ 8 cores, T194)

Architecture and classification
- Technology node: 12 nm
- Instruction set: ARMv8.2-A

Project Denver is the codename of a central processing unit designed by Nvidia that implements the ARMv8-A 64/32-bit instruction sets using a combination of simple hardware decoder and software-based binary translation (dynamic recompilation) where "Denver's binary translation layer runs in software, at a lower level than the operating system, and stores commonly accessed, already optimized code sequences in a 128 MB cache stored in main memory". Denver is a very wide in-order superscalar pipeline. Its design makes it suitable for integration with other SIPs cores (e.g. GPU, display controller, DSP, image processor, etc.) into one die constituting a system on a chip (SoC).

Project Denver is targeted at mobile computers, personal computers, servers, as well as supercomputers. Respective cores have found integration in the Tegra SoC series from Nvidia. Initially Denver cores was designed for the 28 nm process node (Tegra model T132 a.k.a. "Tegra K1"). Denver 2 was an improved design that built for the smaller, more efficient 16 nm node. (Tegra model T186 a.k.a. "Tegra X2").

In 2018, Nvidia released an improved design (codename: "Carmel", based on ARMv8 (64-bit; variant: ARM-v8.2 with 10-way superscalar, functional safety, dual execution, parity & ECC) got integrated into the Tegra Xavier SoC offering a total of 8 cores (or 4 dual-core pairs). The Carmel CPU core supports full Advanced SIMD (ARM NEON), VFP (Vector Floating Point), and ARMv8.2-FP16. First published testings of Carmel cores integrated in the Jetson AGX development kit by third party experts took place in September 2018 and indicated a noticeably increased performance as should expected for this real world physical manifestation compared to predecessors systems, despite all doubts the used quickness of such a test setup in general an in particular implies. The Carmel design can be found in the Tegra model T194 ("Tegra Xavier") that is designed with a 12 nm structure size.

== Overview ==
- Pipelined in-order superscalar processor
- 2-way decoder for ARM instructions
- On-the-fly binary translation of ARM code into internal VLIW instructions by hardware translator, uses software emulation as fallback
- Translation can reorder ARM instructions, and remove ones that do not contribute to the result
- Up to 7 micro-ops per clock cycle with translated VLIW instructions; cannot run simultaneously with ARM decoder
- L1 cache: 128 KiB instruction + 64 KiB data per core (4-way set associative)
- 2 MiB shared L2 cache between two Denver cores (16-way set-associative)
- Denver also sets aside 128 MiB of main memory to store translated VLIW code; this part of memory is inaccessible to the main operating system.
- Up to 2.5 GHz clockspeeds on TSMC 28 nm process

== Chips ==
A dual-core Denver CPU was paired with a Kepler-based GPU solution to form the Tegra K1; the dual-core 2.3 GHz Denver-based K1 was first used in the HTC Nexus 9 tablet, released November 3, 2014. Note, however, that the quad-core Tegra K1, while using the same name, isn't based on Denver.

The Nvidia Tegra X2 has two Denver2 cores paired with four Cortex-A57 cores using a coherent HMP (Heterogeneous Multi-Processor Architecture) approach. They are paired with a Pascal GPU.

The Tegra Xavier has a Volta GPU and several special purpose accelerators. The 8 Carmel CPU cores is divided into 4 ASIC macro blocks (each having 2 cores,) matched to each other with a crossbar and 4 MiB of shared L3 memory.

== History ==
The existence of Project Denver was revealed at the 2011 Consumer Electronics Show. In a March 4, 2011 Q&A article CEO Jen-Hsun Huang revealed that Project Denver is a five-year 64-bit ARMv8-A architecture CPU development on which hundreds of engineers had already worked for three and half years and which also has 32-bit ARM instruction set (ARMv7) backward compatibility. Project Denver was started in Stexar Company (Colorado) as an x86-compatible processor using binary translation, similar to projects by Transmeta. Stexar was acquired by Nvidia in 2006.

According to Tom's Hardware, there are engineers from Intel, AMD, HP, Sun and Transmeta on the Denver team, and they have extensive experience designing superscalar CPUs with out-of-order execution, very long instruction words (VLIW) and simultaneous multithreading (SMT).

According to Charlie Demerjian, the Project Denver CPU may internally translate the ARM instructions to an internal instruction set, using firmware in the CPU. Also according to Demerjian, Project Denver was originally intended to support both ARM and x86 code using code morphing technology from Transmeta, but was changed to the ARMv8-A 64-bit instruction set because Nvidia could not obtain a license to Intel's patents.

The first consumer device shipping with Denver CPU cores, Google's Nexus 9, was announced on October 15, 2014. The tablet was manufactured by HTC and features the dual-core Tegra K1 SoC. The Nexus 9 was the first 64-bit Android device available to consumers.

== See also ==
- Comparison of ARMv8-A cores
