= Samsung Captivate Glide =

Smartphone with Slide keyboard

Samsung Galaxy S Glide
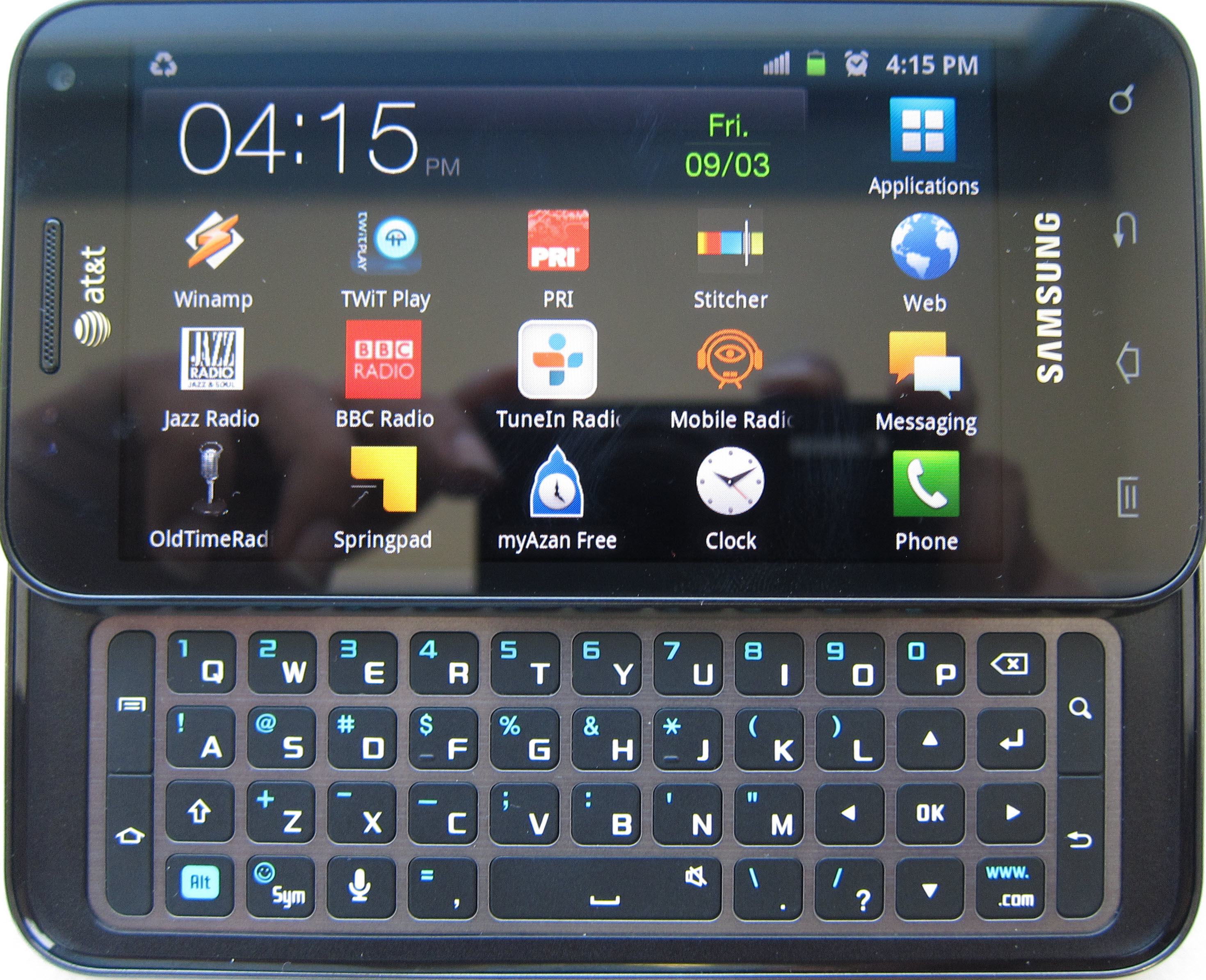
- Samsung Galaxy S Glide or Samsung Captivate Glide with its keyboard extended and back lights on
- Manufacturer: Samsung Electronics
- Type: Slider QWERTY Touchscreen smartphone
- First released: 2011
- Compatible networks: Dual band 802.16e 2.5G (GSM/GPRS/EDGE): 850, 900, 1800, and 1900 MHz; UMTS: 850, 1900, and 2100 MHz; HSPA+: 21/42 Mbit/s; HSUPA: 5.76 Mbit/s
- Dimensions: 124.17 mm (4.889 in) H 64.60 mm (2.543 in) W 13.05 mm (0.514 in) D
- Weight: 152 g (5.4 oz)
- Operating system: Android 2.3.5 "Gingerbread" with TouchWiz 4.0 (upgradeable to Android 4.0.4 "Ice Cream Sandwich" officially, and unofficially upgradeable via custom ROMs to Android 4.4.4 "KitKat")
- System-on-chip: Nvidia Tegra 2 AP20H
- CPU: 1 GHz dual-core ARM Cortex-A9
- GPU: ULP GeForce, Audio DAC: Wolfson WM8994
- Memory: 1 GB RAM
- Storage: 8 GB (4 GB user) flash memory
- Removable storage: microSD (up to 32 GB) (64 GB, unofficial)
- Battery: 1650 mAh (replaceable)
- Rear camera: 8 Mpx Back-illuminated sensor with auto focus, 720p HD video recording. Single LED flash.
- Front camera: 1.3 Mpx for video chatting, video recording (VGA), and stills
- Display: 800×480 px, 10.1 cm (4.0 in); WVGA Super AMOLED (0.37 megapixels)
- Connectivity: 3.5 mm TRRS; Wi-Fi (802.11a/b/g/n); Wi-Fi Direct; Bluetooth 3.0; micro USB 2.0; MHL; HDMI; USB Host (OTG) 2.0
- Data inputs: Physical QWERTY Multi-touch touch screen, headset controls, proximity and ambient light sensors, 3-axis gyroscope, magnetometer, accelerometer, aGPS
- SAR: Head: 0.2 W/kg 1 g Body: 0.54 W/kg 1 g Hotspot: 0.54 W/kg 1 g
- Other: Enhanced Exchange ActiveSync (EAS) to sync email, contacts, calendar and tasks, Device and SD card encryption, Virtual private network, integrated messaging Social Hub, Readers Hub, Music Hub, and Game Hub

The Samsung Captivate Glide (SGH-i927) as it is called in the United States, and sold as the Samsung Galaxy S Glide (SGH-i927R) in Canada, is the first physical QWERTY Galaxy S class smartphone running under the Android operating system to be released by Samsung for AT&T (US) and Rogers Wireless (Canada).

Despite being named for the Captivate, a member of the original Galaxy S line, the Glide is part of the Galaxy S II series of phones. It does, however feature a handful of differences from the flagship Galaxy S II, including a slightly smaller Super AMOLED screen featuring a PenTile matrix like that of the original Galaxy S. It also features an Nvidia Tegra 2 running at 1 GHz, and 8 GB of internal storage rather than 16 GB.

== Availability ==
The Samsung SGH-i927 has only been officially sold in the United States and Canada. The US model is subsidized but locked to the AT&T network when bought with their packages. The phone's front face is branded with the AT&T logo. The Canadian model is subsidized but locked to the Rogers network when bought with their packages. The phone itself does not have any Rogers branding on the housing.

The phone is not selling through any Samsung authorized retail channels outside the US or Canada. However these variants can be bought locked or unlocked, from US or Canada at their full retail prices, from various retailers, and exported around the world. This allows them to be used on compatible GSM networks around the world, provided they are unlocked.

== Software ==
The device shipped with Android 2.3.5 (Gingerbread). In September 2012, AT&T released the Android 4.0 (Ice Cream Sandwich) update via Samsung Kies. However, there were several bugs with the ICS update; due to an error in Quality Control, the light on the hardware keyboard is disabled as well as issues with the lock screen and several problems with the phone portion of the OS. Samsung put the update on hold while they worked to optimize the update and fix the bugs. On November 10, the ICS update was re-released with bug fixes that corrected the issues from the first release.

=== Rooting and unofficial development ===
xda-developers managed to gain root access to the device on 5 December 2011, and posted a how to guide. Since then, many popular custom recoveries (including ClockworkMod and TWRP) have been made available for it. There are also stable custom ROMs available that can upgrade the phone to Android 4.4.4 KitKat. Many of them, especially the KitKat-based ones are still in active development.

=== Carrier software ===
==== AT&T variant ====
The AT&T version of the ROM has carrier restrictions in place that doesn't allow manual toggling of networks between 2G, 3G or 4G bands, where dropping down to 2G frequencies is effective in conserving battery life. These restrictions can be overcome by manually entering service commands or rooting the device and flashing with ROMs that are free of these limitations. The AT&T variant was originally shipped with the Carrier IQ monitoring software, however an Android OS upgrade to 2.3.6 Gingerbread (I927UCKL1) is believed to have removed it.

==== Rogers variant ====
The Rogers version of the ROM doesn't have any such restrictions, and also enables SMS delivery reports. It appears that the ICS (Android 4.x) update is not yet available for the SGH-i927R model which possess a different Firmware version to the AT&T models. The Canadian version from Rogers, SGH-i927R, is believed to be free of Carrier IQ.

== Image Gallery ==
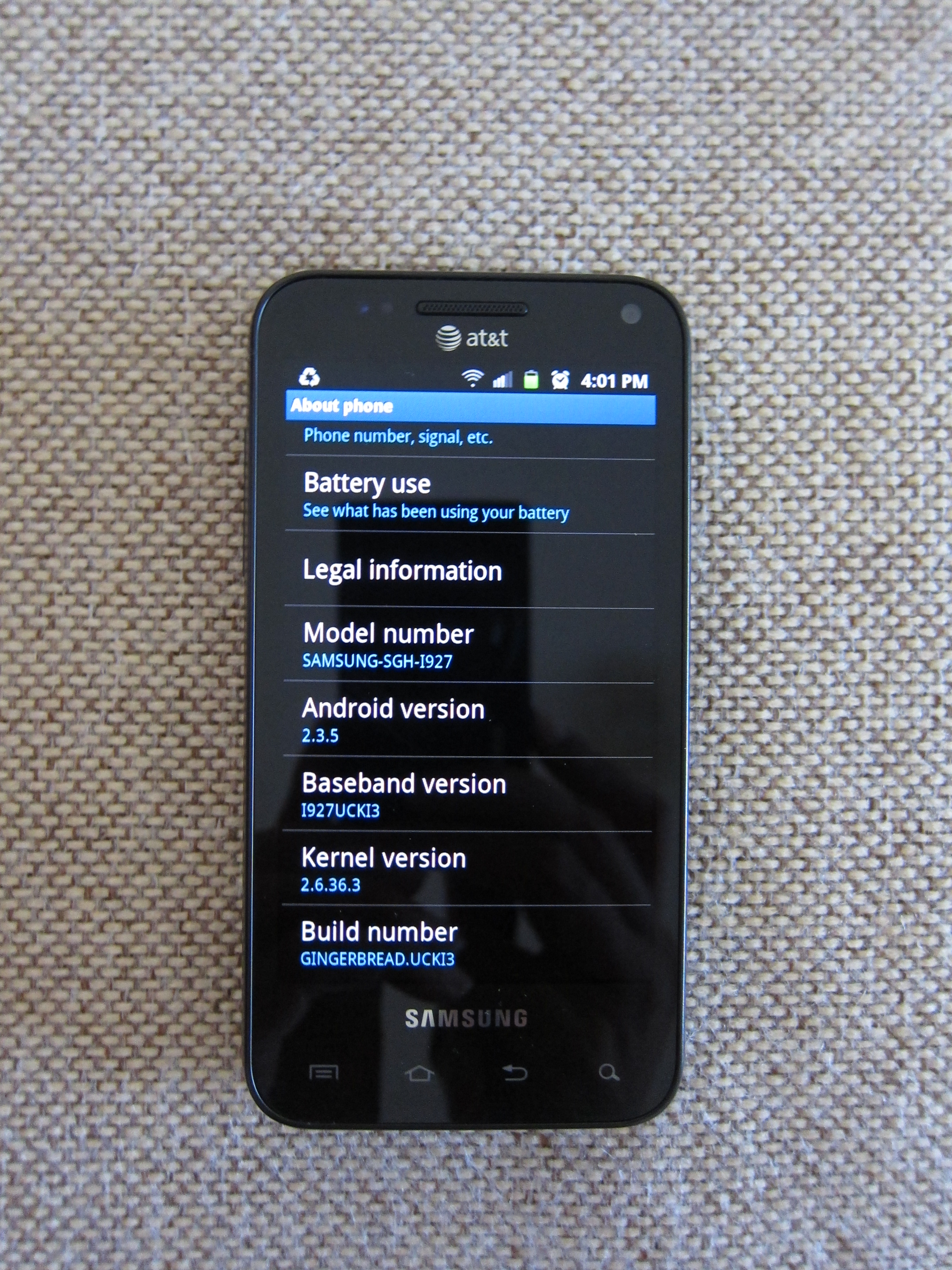

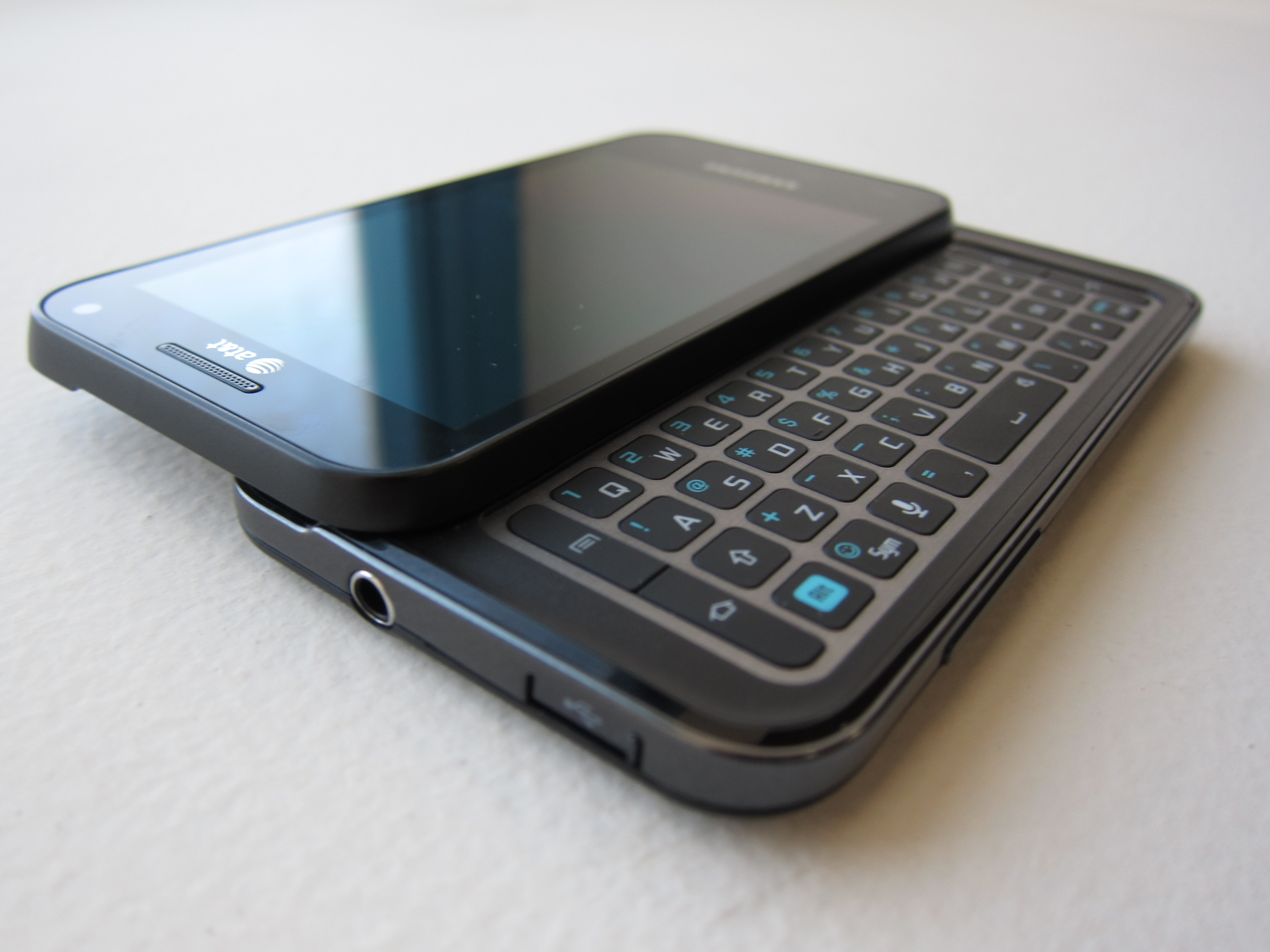

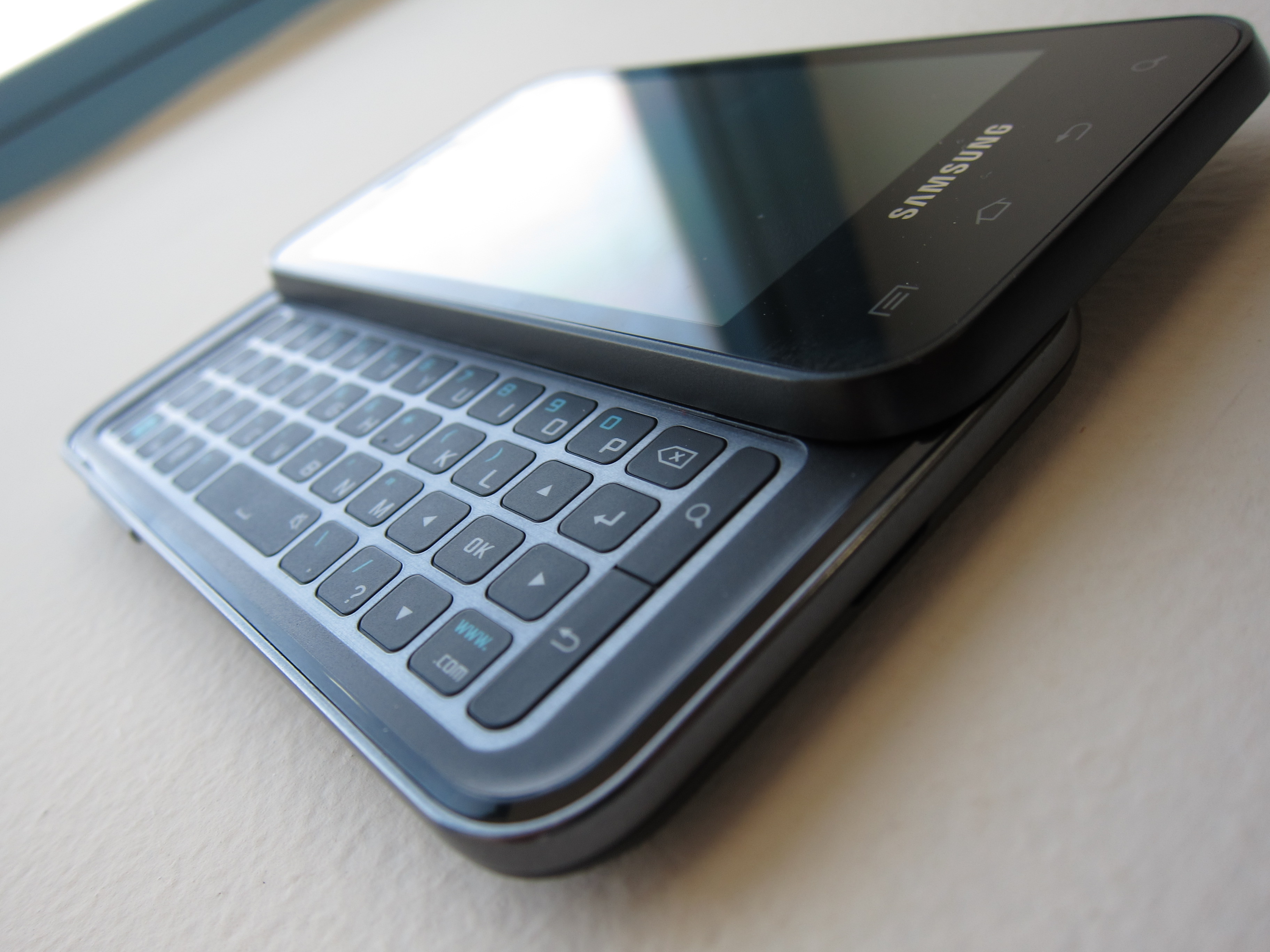

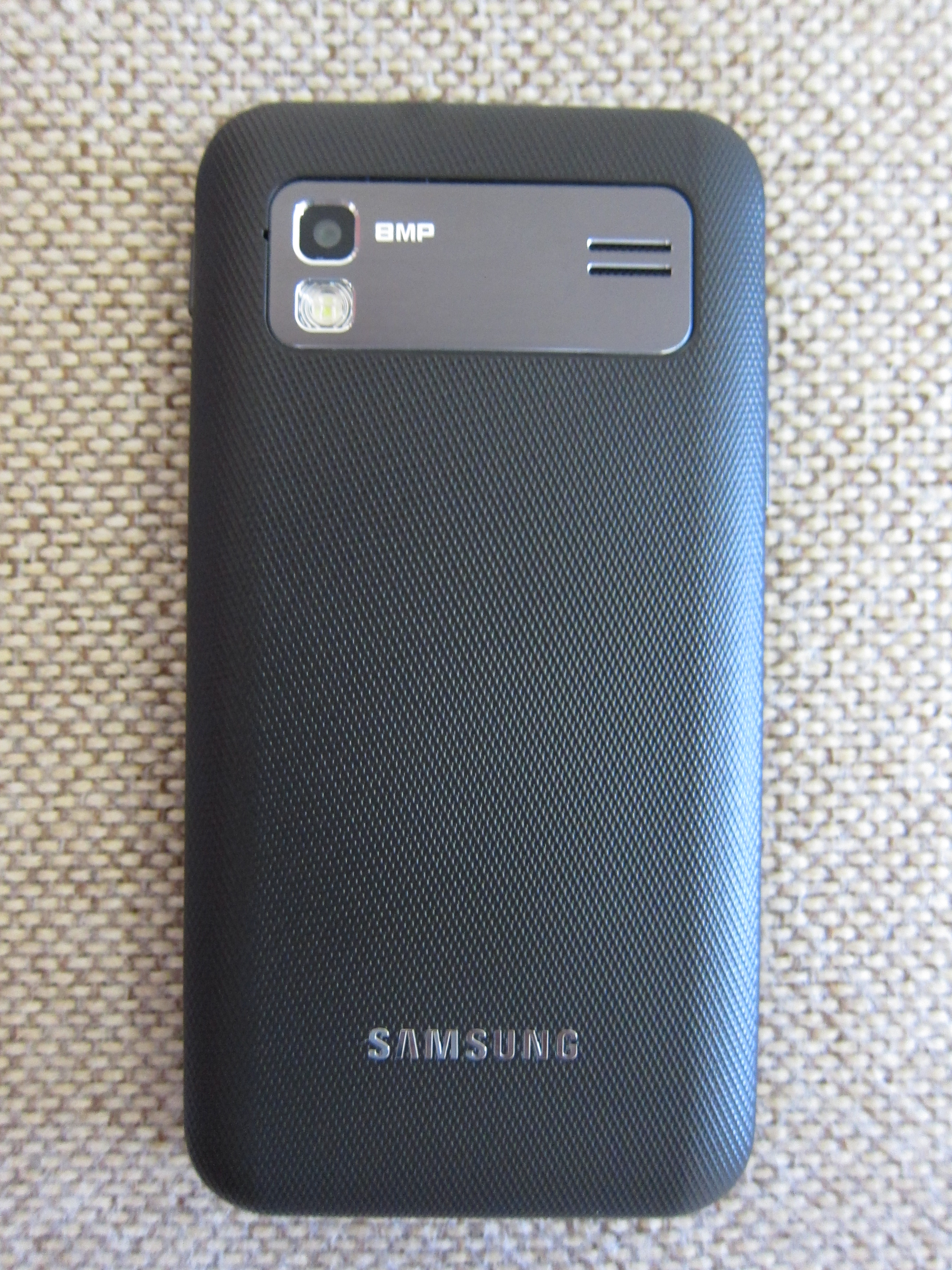

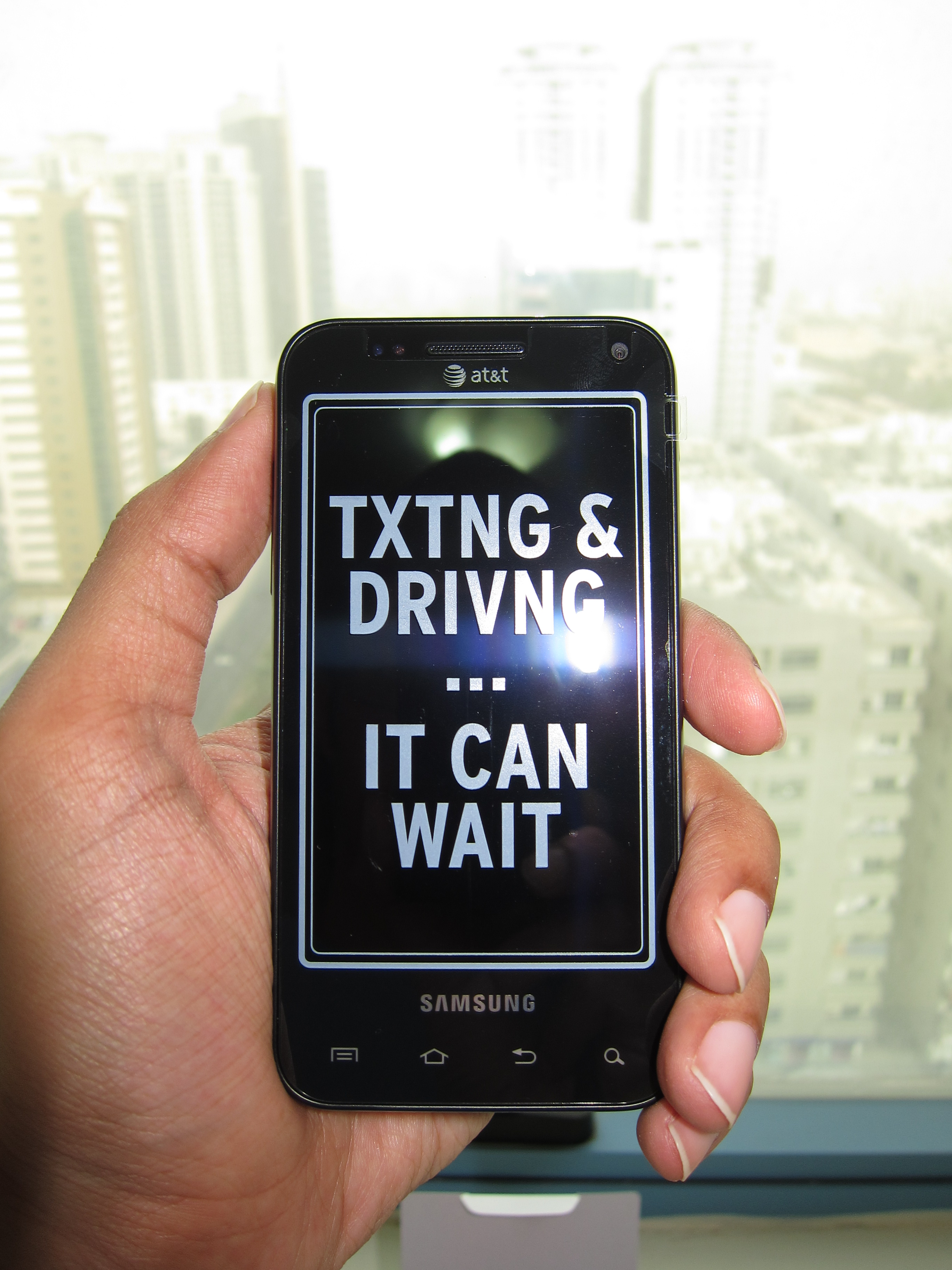
