= Smartbook =

Class of mobile device

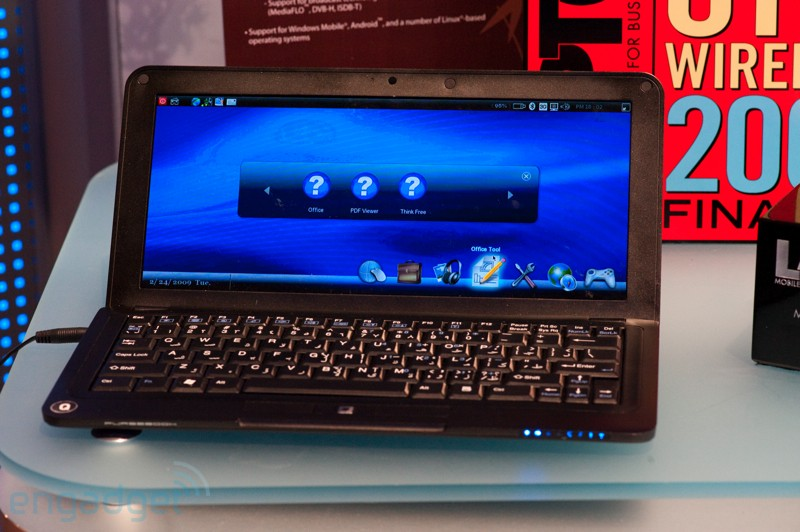
Wistron Pursebook, with 1 GHz Snapdragon ARM CPU (April 2009)

A smartbook is a class of mobile device that combined certain features of both a smartphone and netbook computer, produced between 2009 and 2010. Smartbooks were advertised with features such as always on, all-day battery life, 3G, Wi-Fi or 4G internet connectivity and GPS capabilities in a laptop or tablet-style body with a screen size of 5 to 10 inches and a physical or soft touchscreen keyboard.

A German company sold laptops under the brand Smartbook and held a trademark for the word in many countries (not including some big markets like United States, China, Japan, or India). It acted to preempt others from using the term smartbook to describe their products.

Smartbooks tended to be designed more for entertainment purposes than for productivity and typically targeted to work with online applications. They were projected to be sold subsidized through mobile network operators, like mobile phones, along with a wireless data plan.

== History ==
The smartbook concept was mentioned by Qualcomm in May 2009 during marketing for its Snapdragon technology, with products expected later that year. Difficulties in adapting key software (in particular, Adobe's proprietary Flash Player) to the ARM architecture delayed releases until the first quarter of 2010.

Smartbooks would have been powered by processors which were more energy-efficient than traditional ones typically found in desktop and laptop computers. The first smartbooks were expected to use variants of the Linux operating system, such as Google's Android or ChromeOS. The ARM processor would have allowed them to achieve longer battery life than many larger devices using x86-32 processors. In February 2010, ABI Research projected that 163 million smartbooks would ship in 2015.

In many countries the word Smartbook was a trademark registered by Smartbook AG. In August 2009 a German court ruled Qualcomm must block access from Germany to all its webpages containing the word Smartbook unless Smartbook AG is mentioned. Smartbook AG defended its trademark. A February 2010 ruling prevented Lenovo from using the term. In February 2011 Qualcomm won its legal battle when the German patent office ruled the words "smart" and "book" could be used. However, several trademarks have been registered.

== Designs ==
=== Always Innovating Touch Book ===
In March 2009 the Always Innovating company announced the Touch Book. It was based on the Texas Instruments OMAP 3530 which implemented the ARM Cortex-A8 architecture. It was originally developed from the Texas Instruments BeagleBoard. It had a touchscreen and a detachable keyboard which contained a second battery. The device came with a Linux operating system and the company offered to license their hardware designs.

=== Sharp Netwalker ===
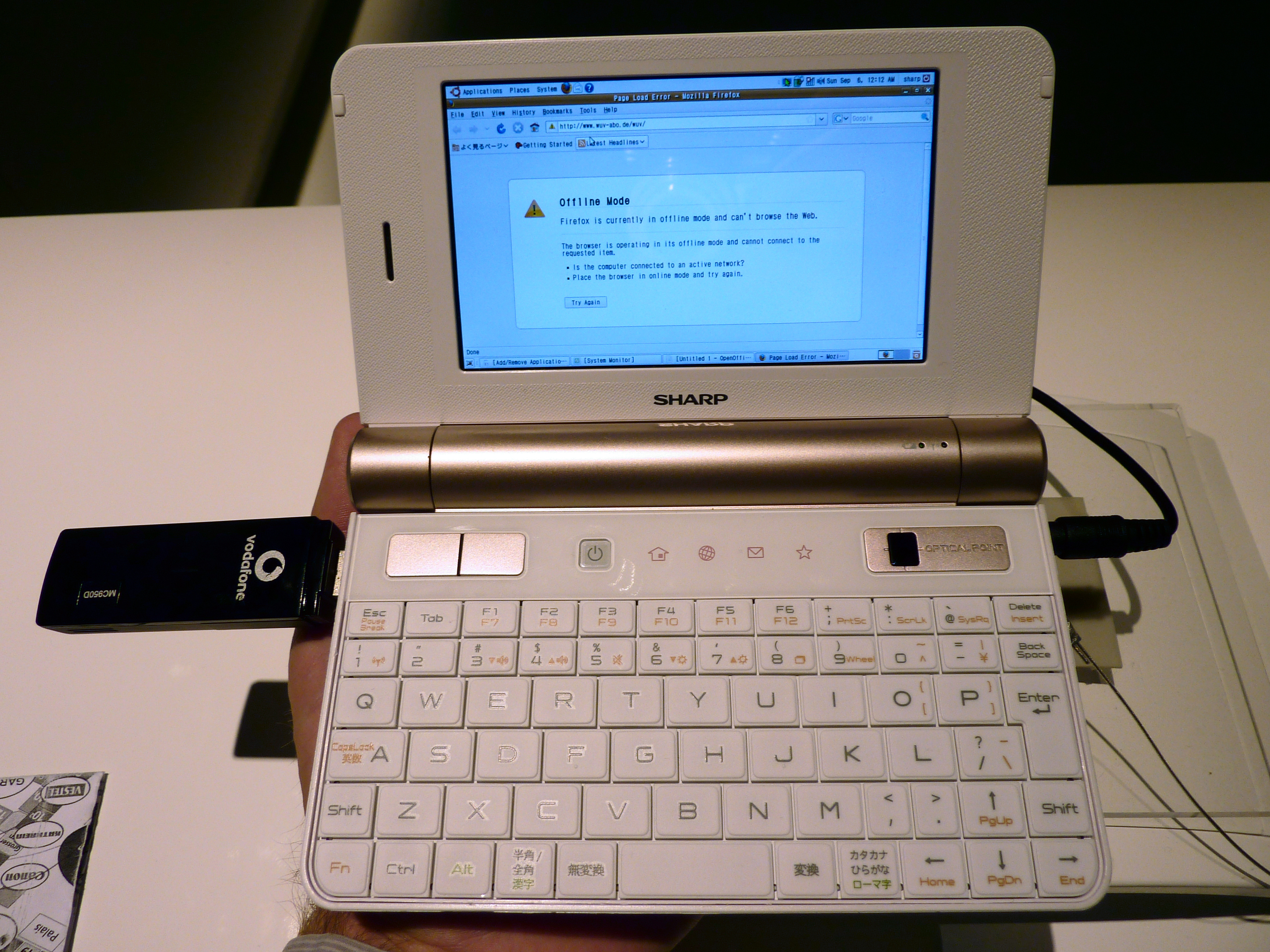
The Sharp PC-Z1 as seen on IFA 2009

Sharp Electronics, introduced their PC-Z1 "Netwalker" device in August 2009 with a promised ship date of October 2009. It featured a 5.5" touchscreen, runs Ubuntu on an ARM Cortex-A8 based Freescale i.MX515 and was packaged in a small clamshell design. Sharp reported the device weighs less than 500 grams and will run 10 hours on one battery charge. The device is said to run 720p video, and have both 2D and 3D graphics acceleration. It comes with Adobe Flash Lite 3.1 installed.

=== Pegatron prototype ===
Pegatron, an Asus company, showed a working prototype of a smartbook in August 2009. It consisted of an ARM Cortex-A8 based Freescale i.MX515 supports 2D/3D graphics as well as 720p HD video, 512 MB DDR2 RAM, 1024x600 8.9" LCD screen, Bluetooth 2.0, 802.11g and run off a SD card. It also featured one USB and one micro USB port, a VGA port as well as a card reader. The smartbook ran Ubuntu Netbook 9.04 and contained a version of Adobe Flash Player which was out of date. The bill of materials for the Pegatron smartbook prototype was $120.

In November 2009 Pegatron said it had received a large number of orders for smartbooks that would launch in early 2010. The devices were rumored to sell for about $200 when subsidized. Asus announced plans to release their own smartbook in the first quarter of 2010.

=== Lenovo Skylight ===
Qualcomm was expected to announce a smartbook on November 12, 2009, at an analyst meeting. A Lenovo device concept was shown, and announced in January 2010. In May 2010 the Skylight was cancelled.

=== Compaq Airlife 100 ===
In late January 2010 a U.S. Federal Communications Commission (FCC) listing featured a device from HP that was referred as smartbook, while a prototype of the same device was already shown earlier. In beginning February on Mobile World Congress in Barcelona, HP announced it will bring this device to market. The specifications will most likely be following:

- CPU: 1 GHz Qualcomm Snapdragon processor running Android
- Display: 10.1 inch touchscreen
- Storage: 16 GB SSD
- Networking: 3G and Wi-Fi
- Battery: up to 12 hours, 10 days in standby mode

In the end of March 2010 the smartbook made an appearance at FCC again, this time listing its 3G capabilities. According to FCC, the device will support GSM 850 and 1900, as well as WCDMA II and V bands. These WCDMA bands may indicate the usage in AT&T network in the United States. Details of the product is now available on the HP website.

=== Toshiba AC100 ===
In June 2010, a smartbook device from Toshiba was announced. It features Nvidia Tegra processor and is able to remain in stand-by mode for up to 7 days. The device was officially available at the Toshiba United Kingdom site. Originally delivered with Android v2.1 (upgradable to v2.2 since 2011) it can also be modified to run a customized Linux distribution.

In Japan, was sold as "Dynabook AZ".

=== Genesi Efika MX ===
The Genesi company announced an MX Smartbook as part of their Efika line in August 2010. It was originally priced at US$349, and some reviewers questioned if it was small enough to fit this definition. It is ostensibly a derivative of the above-mentioned Pegatron design.

=== Others ===
In September 2009, Foxconn announced it is working on smartbook development. In November 2009, a Quanta Computer pre-production Snapdragon powered sample smartbook device that ran Android was unveiled. Companies like Acer Inc. planned to release a smartbook, but due to the popularity of the iPad and the MacBook Air, plans were scrapped.

== See also ==
- Mobile internet device
- Ultra-mobile PC
- iPad
- Virtual keyboard
- Netbook
- Subnotebook
