= Intel 80386EX =

Type of microprocessor

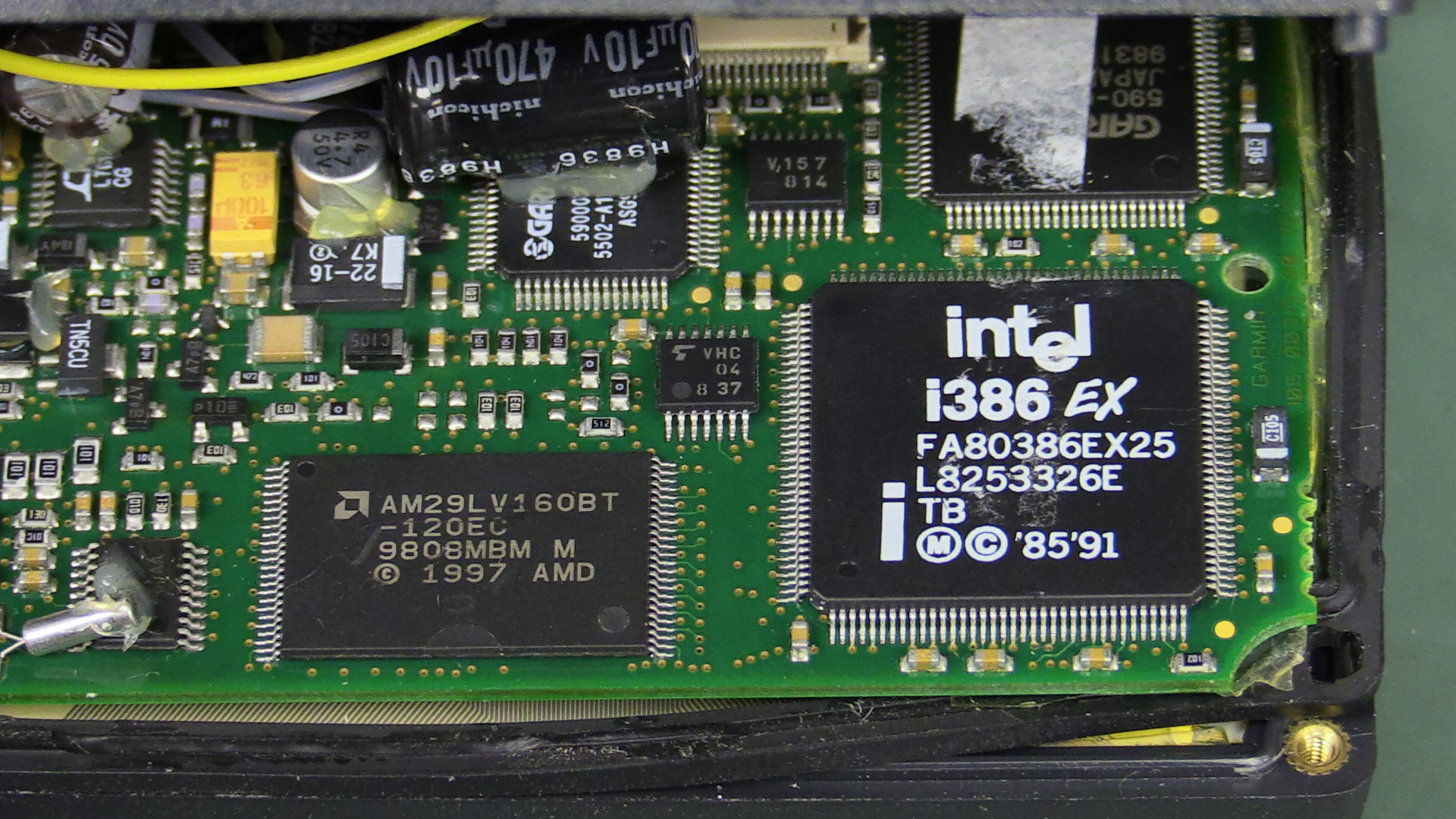
An Intel i386 EX embedded processor inside a Garmin GPS III+

The Intel i386EX (80386EX) is a variant of the Intel 386 microprocessor designed for embedded systems. Introduced in August 1994 and was successful in the market, being used aboard several orbiting satellites and microsatellites.

Intel's previous x86 CPU for the embedded market was the Intel 80186. Like the 80186, the 80386EX integrates several peripherals including a timer, DMA controller, and interrupt controller. This vastly reduces the number of system components required for implementing a 80386EX-based system. Unlike the 80186, the peripherals of the 80386EX are compatible with standard PC/AT components.

Intel did not manufacture another integrated x86 processor until 2007, when it confirmed the Enhanced Pentium M-based Tolapai (EP80579).

The Intel386 EX processor was planned in sample for April 1994 with production in third quarter for US$39 in 5,000-piece quantities.

== Characteristics ==
- Introduced August 1994
- Variant of 80386SX intended for embedded systems
- 26-bit memory addressing for up to 64 MiB of DRAM
- 16-bit data bus, limiting performance but reducing system cost
- Static core, i.e. may run as slowly (and thus, power efficiently) as desired, down to full halt
- Support for System Management Mode
- On-chip peripherals:
  - clock and power management
  - timers/counters
  - watchdog timer
  - serial I/O units (synchronous and asynchronous) and parallel I/O
  - DMA
  - RAM refresh
  - JTAG test logic
- Significantly more successful than the 80376

== Uses ==
The i386EX was notably used in the following:

- Several orbiting satellites and microsatellites.
- NASA's FlightLinux project.
- USRobotics Courier I modem V.everything (Internal ISA and External RS232 ISDN Terminal Adapters with 56KBPS analog remote access server).
- Ericsson R290 and Globalstar/Qualcomm GSP-1600 satellite phone.
- Many older Garmin GPS units, such as the GPS 48, II, III, and 12.
- Akai S5000 & S6000 digital samplers.
- Nokia 9000 Communicator phone.
- Swarco ITC-2 traffic light controller.
- Sperry Marine Navigat X MKI/MKII gyro compasses.
- Gallagher/Cardax FT 3000.
- Videokê/intermagic karaokês.
- Ziton ZP3 Fire Alarm control panel.

== See also ==
- Intel 80186/Intel 80188
- Intel 80376
- Intel Timna
- Atom (system on chip)
- Intel Quark
