= ThinkPad Tablet 2 =

Tablet computer

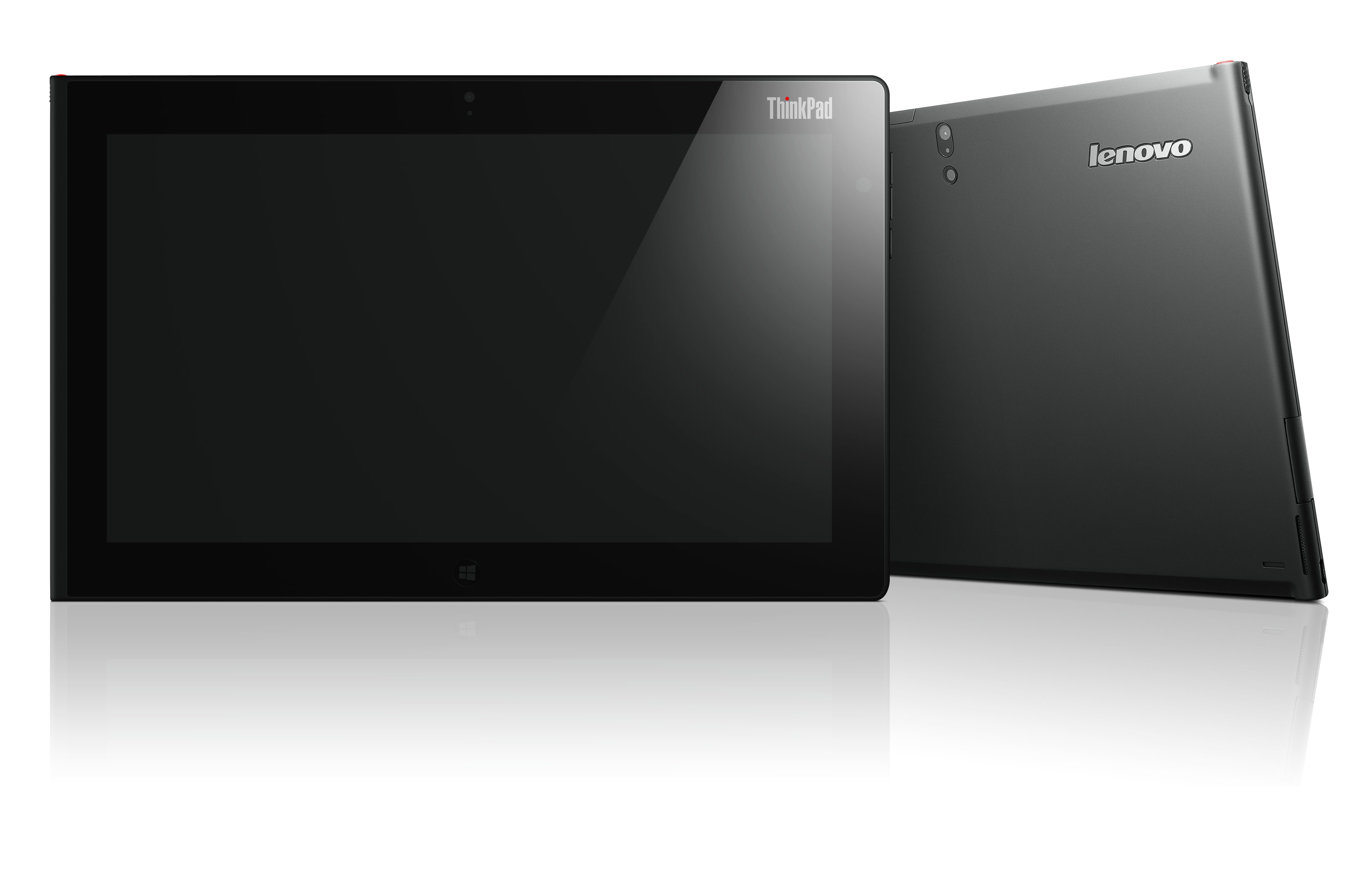
The ThinkPad Tablet 2 from front and back.

The ThinkPad Tablet 2 is a tablet computer announced in 2012 and released by Lenovo in 2013.

The Tablet 2 is the successor to the original Android-based ThinkPad Tablet, and was one of the launch tablet devices for the touch-oriented Microsoft Windows 8 operating system. The success of the device has led to successor models, the ThinkPad 8 (2013) and both generations of the ThinkPad 10 (2014), also using Windows in place of Android.

== Launch ==
In order to celebrate the 20th anniversary of the ThinkPad, Lenovo held a large party in New York where it announced several products, including the Tablet 2. Although Lenovo indicated that the ThinkPad Tablet 2 would be available on 26 October 2012 when Windows 8 was released, it later indicated that the device would be available in December 2012. However, delivery for orders in December were not made until late January and beyond.

== Features ==
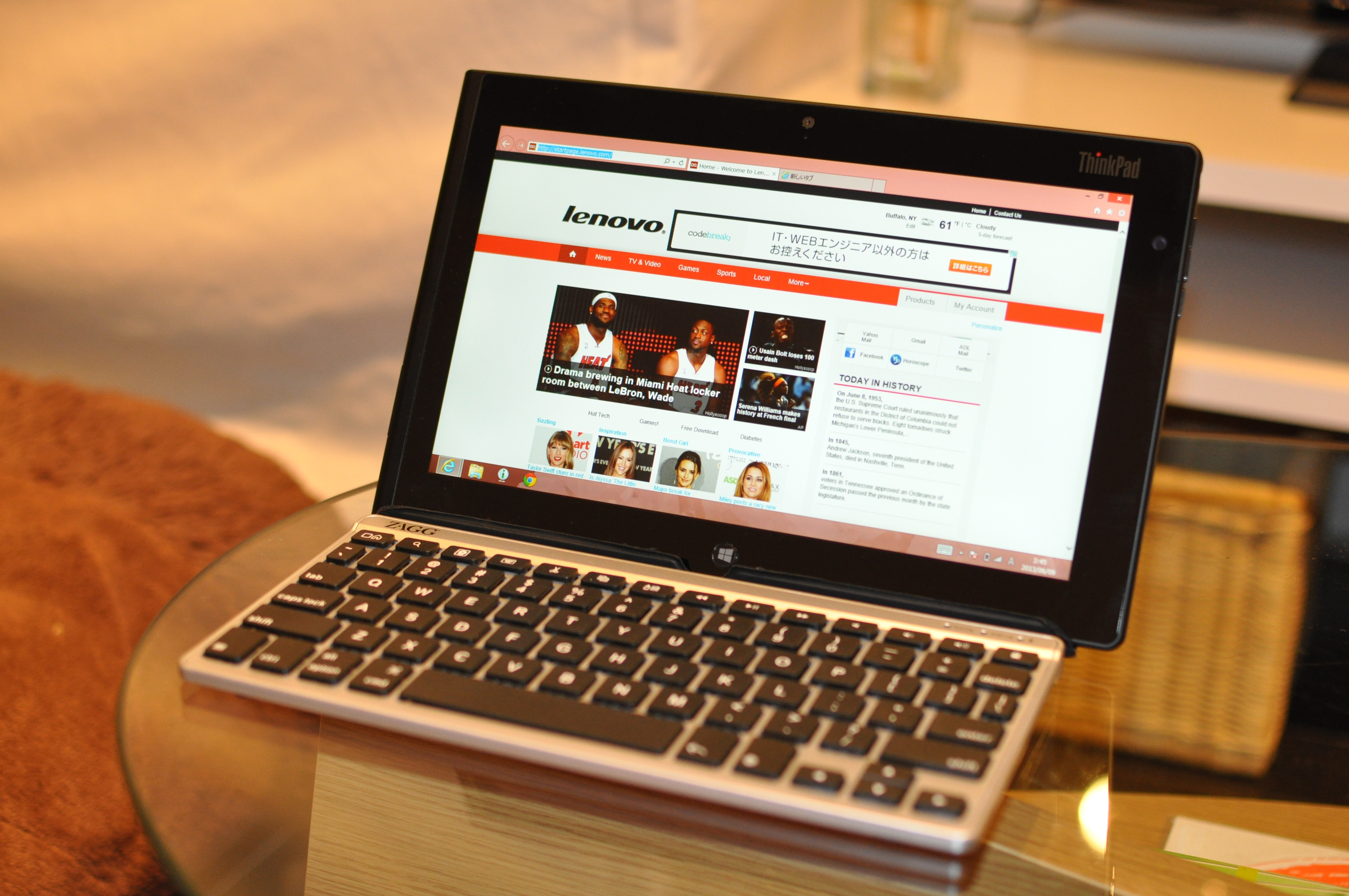
ThinkPad Tablet 2 with keyboard

=== Design ===
According to The Verge, "It may be a ThinkPad, but this device is unequivocally a tablet — a wide, skinny, thin tablet, more like a Kindle Fire HD than a MacBook Air. The all-black exterior is sleek but utterly ordinary, and its 1.3-pound heft is pretty much bog standard as well. It's certainly well-made, with comfortable rounded corners and a soft-touch matte finish, it's just not a particularly unique look." The Tablet 2 has a magnesium frame and a black polycarbonate case.

=== Specifications and performance ===
The Tablet 2 uses the Intel Atom Z2760 SoC "Clover Trail" (system on a chip) platform at 1.8 GHz and has 2 cores with 1 Mb of cache. The Tablet 2 has 2 gigabytes of 800 MHz LPDDR2 memory and comes with either a 32- or 64-gigabyte eMMC. The ThinkPad Tablet 2 runs the full Windows 8 operating system (32-bit) from Microsoft and will thus be able to run any desktop software compatible with this version of Windows. In a review, CNET wrote, "Windows 8 looked readable and functional, both in Metro and standard Windows-based interfaces."

The Tablet 2 has a 10.1-inch IPS display with a 16:9 aspect ratio, 400 nits, 500:1 contrast ratio and a resolution of 1366 x 768. The graphics is powered by the PowerVR SGX545 graphics, that is part of the Intel Atom SoC. The Tablet 2 makes use of multi-touch technology for screen-based input (supporting five-finger gestures). Like the original ThinkPad Tablet, the Tablet 2 has an optional stylus (with digital pen functionality) for precision input, which can be stored in the side of the tablet. Lenovo also released a Bluetooth keyboard that can be carried with the tablet in a folio-style case.

The Tablet 2 has a full-size USB 2.0 port for connecting accessories and another micro-USB 2.0 to be used for charging only (using the built-in adapter, though other micro-USB cables also work). Powered USB devices will not work on the full-size USB port. External displays can be connected using the mini-HDMI port. A headphone/microphone combo jack and a connector for an available docking station for the device, which included three full-size USB ports, separate headphone/microphone jacks, HDMI, Ethernet, and a 20V power connector for fast charging. The following hardware buttons can be found around the tablet: Windows button, Power button, volume control button, rotation lock switch, reset switch. Models with 3G and 4G cellular data are both available. The Tablet 2 will have Near Field Communications, also known as NFC, built in.

The tablet is also equipped with two cameras. It has an 8-megapixel rear camera with LED flash, and is capable of 720p video capture. The front camera is 2.0 megapixels. A mini-HDMI port is included for video output. A noise-canceling microphone is included in order to facilitate video conferencing.

The built-in battery is a 30 watt-hour lithium polymer battery. Lenovo quotes 25 days of standby power, 150 hours of MP3 playback, up to ten hours web browsing, and ten hours of local video playback.

== Reviews ==
David Pierce wrote for The Verge, "I like almost everything about the ThinkPad Tablet 2. It's a handsome, well-made device that offers excellent battery life, does everything I'd expect a tablet to, and does it all well. It even does a few things I wouldn't expect from a slate – try running Photoshop or Steam on your iPad, I'll wait — and even if it doesn't do them especially well, its ability to masquerade as a "real computer" is still a big advantage. At the risk of beating a dead horse, this isn't a replacement for a Windows PC like the Acer Aspire S7 or Lenovo's own Yoga 13, but next to the other Windows tablets on the market it's clearly the best option. It's also the best Atom-powered device I've tried, beating the HP Envy X2, the Acer Iconia W510, and others on battery life, performance, and especially build quality — but they do have trackpads, so choose your tradeoffs wisely."

Mark Taormino wrote in a review for Examiner.com, "Windows 8 has been designed to operate on a tablet, and leverage existing Microsoft applications such as Word and Excel. Student complaints abound that the current tablets do not support Word or Excel, so are of limited value in education settings. This is primarily true in higher education where students write many papers, and use spreadsheet software. The standard, like it or not, is Word and Excel. The introduction of a Microsoft operating system that can run on tablets and can support Microsoft applications will have widespread appeal to students."

In a review for IT PRO Khidr Suleman wrote, "During our hands-on, we found the stylus glided across the surface of the display smoothly. The accuracy of the handwriting recognition software was also reasonable and it converted our scribbles into text in the blink of an eye." He also wrote, "We found the device to be easy to hold and Windows 8 ran was smoothly. However, we did find there was a noticeable stutter when playing full HD video and switching between applications. However, as this is a pre-production model, we expect this to be ironed out."

In its review of the ThinkPad Tablet 2 the Notebook Review wrote, "The Lenovo ThinkPad Tablet 2 is fantastic device when used as a casual tablet or business PC for a mobile sales force. The machine looks great, it's light and easy to hold, and the battery lasts all day. Users who simply want to browse the web or run basic productivity applications will be best served by this hybrid tablet, but those users also probably won't need a $740 Windows 8 machine either. The ThinkPad Tablet 2 targets an audience that wants more productivity options that what an iPad or Windows 7 netbook offer. However, with the machine's limited Intel Atom processor and integrated graphics, the device struggles to take full advantage of everything Windows 8 has to offer. Additionally, users who do not opt for the $120 keyboard dock will find the device's productivity greatly hindered."

Preceded by ThinkPad Tablet	ThinkPad Tablet 2; 2012	Succeeded by ThinkPad 10
Preceded by ThinkPad Tablet	ThinkPad Tablet 2; 2012	Succeeded by ThinkPad 8
