= ThinkPad 8 =

Tablet computer by Lenovo

The ThinkPad 8 is a business-oriented tablet computer with an eight-inch touchscreen, released by Lenovo in January 2014. It is one of the Lenovo's first Windows-based small-screen tablet devices, along with the Lenovo Miix 2, and also one of the first with a high-resolution full HD display. Along with the first-generation ThinkPad 10, it is part of the third generation of ThinkPad-branded tablets, succeeding the ThinkPad Tablet 2.

== Specifications ==
The ThinkPad 8 has an 8.3-inch multi-touch IPS display with a 1920×1200 resolution and 16:10 aspect ratio. It is powered by Intel's "Bay Trail" quad-core mobile Atom Z3770 CPU, has two gigabytes of RAM, and comes with up to 128 gigabytes of internal flash storage. Micro-HDMI and USB ports allow use with an external display, and a keyboard or mouse. A microSD card slot allows storage upgrades. Models with Wi-Fi only and units with additional 4G cellular data connectivity are both available. Stereo sound is delivered through a pair of speakers placed on the device's back side.

The ThinkPad 8 weighs 439 g (0.968 lb), and it is 8.8 mm (0.35 in) thick. Its back is made from machine-cut aluminum and the front is all black. The rear eight-megapixel camera is surrounded by a red accent, while the two-megapixel front-facing camera blends into the face. An optional so-called "quickshot cover" magnetically attaches to the device and wakes it upon opening, and also has a small flap covering the rear camera that automatically starts the camera application when lifted.

The ThinkPad 8 runs the Microsoft Windows 8 operating system and comes standard with Microsoft Office.

== History ==
The ThinkPad 8 was launched in the United States in late January 2014, at a starting price of $449.

As of March 2015, it has been discontinued on the Lenovo's online store in the United States.

== See also ==
- Comparison of tablet computers
- History of tablet computers
- ThinkPad Tablet
