= IdeaPad tablets =

Brand of tablet computers by Lenovo

The IdeaPad tablets from Lenovo were a brand of consumer-oriented tablet computers designed for home use or entertainment, as opposed to the business-focused ThinkPad Tablet series. Devices sold in certain countries, such as China, India and New Zealand, were sold under the LePad brand, similar to the LePhone series of smartphones. IdeaPad-branded tablets have been produced with the Android and Windows operating systems.

The IdeaPad brand has been gradually phased out in recent years, being replaced by the general "Tab" brand for Android devices and the "Miix" brand for Windows devices, with the exception of several distinctive hardware lines such as the Yoga series.

== 2014 ==
=== Lenovo Yoga Tablet 2 Pro ===
The Yoga Tablet 2 Pro is 13-inch tablet with a built-in projector. It has a 9,600 mAh battery that Lenovo claims will last up to 15 hours of continuous use. Its display has a resolution of 2,560 pixels by 1,440 pixels. 32 gigabytes of built-in storage come standard but can be expanded to 64 gigabytes with a microSD card.

The Yoga Tablet 2 Pro, like previous Yoga tablets, has a thin body with a thick cylindrical base. The thick base is designed to make holding the device in portrait mode more comfortable. The device's projector is mounted here. The projector has a resolution of 854 pixels by 480 pixels. Sound is provided by stereo speakers and a subwoofer built into the base.

=== A10 ===
The Lenovo A10 tablet is a 10.1-inch tablet computer that runs Android.

== 2012 ==
=== IdeaTab Lynx ===
The Lenovo IdeaTab Lynx was released in the United States in December 2012. The Lynx tablet sold for $599 and its Accutype keyboard base was priced at $149. The Lynx is an 11.6-inch tablet. The Lynx without the dock is 11.85 inches by 7.4 inches by 0.37 inches and weighs 1.41 pounds. This is approximately the same weight and thickness as the third generation Apple iPad. The keyboard dock weighs 1.45 pounds for a total 2.86 pounds. The Lynx runs the full-version of Windows 8 as opposed to Windows RT. The Lynx uses a 1.8 GHz dual-core Clovertrail Intel Atom Z2760 processor, 2 GB of memory, and either 32 GB or 64 GB of eMMC flash storage. The 11.6-inch in-plane switching display has a resolution of 1,366 × 768 resolution and supports five-point capacitive multitouch. Micro-USB and micro-HDMI ports and a microSD card slot are on Lynx table. The keyboard dock has two standard USB 2.0 ports. The Lynx also has Bluetooth 4.0, 802.11b/g/n Wi-Fi networking, stereo speakers, dual microphones, a 2-megapixel front-facing webcam.

In its review of the Lynx, CNET wrote: "The real question is, how will the Lynx stand out? One answer might be its weight. Despite its 11.6-inch screen, the tablet felt shockingly light when we held it at Lenovo's launch event. Although Lenovo says it's 1.44 pounds, the Lynx's tablet portion is closer in feel to a Kindle than an iPad, but with a larger display than either. The keyboard dock takes away from the Lynx's airiness, of course, although the two at least feel solidly linked when you use them together. The latch is so secure that you don't have to worry about accidentally dislodging the screen. We were also happy with the responsiveness of the Lynx's touchscreen, although we didn't get a chance to really challenge it during our five minute hands-on."

=== IdeaPad K2 ===
IdeaPad K2 (IdeaPad K2010) is 1920x1200 pixel, 10.1-inch IPS panel tablet with Tegra 3 running at 1.7 GHz (possibly overclocked), 2 GB RAM, Fingerprint scanner, and keyboard dock. It is known as LePad K2 or LePad K2010 in China. IdeaPad K2 is meant for high-end gamers and business users. Lenovo has displayed this tablet in the "New Product showcase" for India.

=== IdeaTab A1 ===
IdeaTab A1 is a 1024x600 7-inch display tablet with Android 2.3 or 4.0.

=== IdeaTab S2109 ===
IdeaTab S2109 is 1024 × 768 pixels with 4:3 aspect ratio, 9.7-inch IPS display with OMAP 4430 SoC (dual core ARM Cortex A9 1 GHz and SGX540 PowerVR GPU), 1 GB RAM. 3 versions with 8, 16 or 32 GB included storage capacity and Android 4.0.

=== IdeaTab S2110 ===
IdeaTab S2110. 10.1-inch IPS display tablet using Qualcomm 1.5 GHz SoC with 1 GB RAM and Android 4.0.

- 5 MP rear camera with autofocus and led flash
- 1.3 MP front webcam
- 720P playback
- AGPS able to find position in 10 seconds on 3G model
- 3G (optional) and WiFi
- FM radio tuner
- 1.3 lbs

=== IdeaTab A2109 ===
- Android 4.0.4/4.1.1 with Lenovo skin
- 9" TFT 1280x800 resolution (169 PPI) in 16:10 aspect ratio
- Quad Core 1.3 GHz Tegra 3 with ULP GeForce GPU and 1 GB RAM
- 3.2 MP rear camera, 1.3 MP front camera
- WiFi, Bluetooth, GPS, Compass
- 11mm thickness

== 2011 ==
Three Tablets were announced by Lenovo in the IdeaPad Tablet line in 2011: the IdeaPad K1, A1 and P1.

=== IdeaPad K1 ===
The IdeaPad K1 Tablet was announced in July 2011. The IdeaPad K1 tablet offered the following specifications:

- Processor: NVIDIA Tegra T20 1.0 GHz
- Operating system: Android 3.1
- Dimensions (inches): 10.4 x 7.4 x 0.5
- Weight: less than 1.7 pounds
- Battery life: up to 10 hours
- RAM: up to 1 GB DDR2
- Storage: up to 64 GB SSD
- Connectivity: Bluetooth, 802.11b/g/n WiFi
- Slots: MicroSD card reader
- Ports: mini HDMI, optional docking port
- Camera: 2 megapixel (front), 5 megapixel (rear)
- Colors – Black, White, Red
- Full Flash support
- Integrated cloud storage (2 GB free)
- Support: 1-year base system warranty, 2-year warranty extension plan

More than 30 free apps were pre-loaded on the IdeaPad, including Angry Birds HD, Need for Speed: Shift, Kindle for Android, Documents To Go, and Norton Mobile Security.

In its review, Gizmodo appreciated the value that the IdeaPad K1 represented, with the offer of a 32 GB tablet for only $499. The reviewer described the Tablet as one of the most attractive that Gizmodo had reviewed, with its “matte, chrome-colored side and back trim and deep red back panel”. The IdeaPad K1 tablet featured interface improvements as compared to other Android 3.1 tablets. Gizmodo indicated that the battery life was above average for Android Tablets: 8 hours and 3 minutes, despite continuous Web surfing over Wi-fi.

The IdeaPad K1 was summarized by LAPTOP Magazine as offering “a strong mix of style, performance, and uniquely compelling enhancements to the Android 3.1 UI”.

=== IdeaPad A1 ===
The IdeaPad A1 Tablet was announced in September 2011. The PCWorld review indicated that the A1 would be the first 7-inch tablet prices at $200 or less. The reviewer stated that the low price was achieved through a reduction in storage capacity, not functionality. The basic unit offered 2 GB of internal storage and other variants with more storage would be made available. The A1 contained a Micro SD card slot, which allowed expansion of up to 32 GB.

The A1 tablet was powered by a single-core 1 GHz Cortex A8 processor. It was suggested by the reviewer that the "single-core CPU may be the reason why no Honeycomb is on board, and may explain how Lenovo can achieve its aggressive price".

A feature indicated to be "most notable for a tablet at this price" was the capacitive touch screen. This was in contrast to the resistive touch screen found on value tablets. The display also offered a higher-than average resolution, of 1024x600 pixels and 170 pixels per inch (ppi). The ppi value made the display sharper than even that of the Apple iPad 2, which offered only 132 ppi on a 9.7-inch screen.

The fact that the A1 included Android 2.3 (Gingerbread) as opposed to Android 3.2 (Honeycomb), was indicated to be a point of concern. The reviewer said that those companies which did incorporate Android 2.2 or 2.3 only achieved this by making significant customizations to the on-board apps as well as the interface. At the time of announcement, Lenovo had not provided information on what customizations had been made, if any.

The IdeaPad A1 tablet was 0.47 inches thin and weighed 0.88 lbs. The A1 offered four different colors: white, black, pink, and light blue.

A feature of the A1 announced by Lenovo was the inclusion of a magnesium alloy roll cage, which protected internal components through bumpers. Another key feature of the A1 was the GPS which did not require a data connection to be used.

=== IdeaPad P1 ===
The IdeaPad P1 Tablet was different from both the IdeaPad K1 and ThinkPad Tablets in that it featured Windows 7 as the operating system instead of Android 3.1. Additionally, unlike the K1 and ThinkPad Tablets, the P1 Tablet included an Intel Atom processor as opposed to an NVIDIA Tegra processor. Lenovo IdeaPad P1 Windows tablet also preloaded with Adobe Flash Player 10.3, Lenovo App Shop, Microsoft Security Essentials and Lenovo App Manager for switch from entertainment to productivity apps like send email, games, or watch the online movies.

The specifications of the IdeaPad P1 are as follows:

- Processor: Intel Atom 1.5 GHz
- Operating system: Windows 7
- Display: 10.1 inch, 1280x800 capacitive touchscreen with support for an optional capacitive stylus
- RAM: up to 2 GB DDR2
- Storage: up to 64 GB SSD
- Connectivity: Bluetooth, optional 3G, WiFi
- Camera: 2 MP front-facing webcam
- Ports: USB 2.0, docking port
- Slots: Micro SD
- Audio: 1.5 W speaker, microphone, headset connectors
- Weight: 1.75 lb
- Dimensions (inches): 10.9 x 0.57 x 7.24
- Battery life: 6 hours
