= Atom (system on a chip) =

System on chip

Atom is a system on a chip (SoC) platform designed for smartphones and tablet computers, launched by Intel in 2012. It is a continuation of the partnership announced by Intel and Google on September 13, 2011 to provide support for the Android operating system on Intel x86 processors. This range competes with existing SoCs developed for the smartphone and tablet market from companies such as Texas Instruments, Nvidia, Qualcomm and Samsung. Unlike these companies, which use ARM-based CPUs designed from the beginning to consume very low power, Intel has adapted the x86-based Intel Atom line of CPU developed for low power usage in netbooks, to even lower power usage.

Since April 2012, several manufacturers have released Intel Atom-based tablets and phones as well as using the SoCs as a basis for other small form factor devices (e.g. mini PCs and stick PCs).

In April 2016, Intel announced a major restructuring, including the cancellation of the SoFIA platform. It was reported by many news outlets that Broxton (the final version in the Atom line) was cancelled.

== List of systems ==
Model number, SoC and platform codenames	Fabrication technology	CPU				GPU		Memory	Availability	Utilizing devices
Model number, SoC and platform codenames	Fabrication technology	Instruction set	Microarchitecture	Model, frequency	Cache	Microarchitecture	Model, frequency	Memory	Availability	Utilizing devices
Atom Z2460 (Penwell, platform Medfield)	32 nm High-κ/metal gate	x86	Saltwell with HT	1.6 GHz single-core	L1: 32 KB Instruction + 24 KB Data, L2: 512 KB	PowerVR Series 5 (SGX)	540 @ 400 MHz (6.4 GFLOPs)	32-bit Dual-channel 400 MHz LPDDR2-800 (6.4 GB/s)	Q2 2012	List: Lenovo K800, Orange San Diego / Lava XOLO X900 / X910 / MegaFon Mint, ZTE Grand X IN, Ramos W32 XOLO x910, HP 7 1800 (Mesquite)
Atom Z2480 (platform Medfield)	32 nm High-κ/metal gate	x86	Saltwell with HT	2 GHz single-core	L1: 32 KB Instruction + 24 KB Data, L2: 512 KB	PowerVR Series 5 (SGX)	540 @ 400 MHz (6.4 GFLOPs)	32-bit Dual-channel 400 MHz LPDDR2-800 (6.4 GB/s)	Q3 2012	List: Motorola RAZR i, XOLO X1000, Casper Via A6108
Atom Z2420 (Lexington, platform Medfield)	32 nm High-κ/metal gate	x86	Saltwell with HT	1.2 GHz single-core	L1: 32 KB Instruction + 24 KB Data, L2: 512 KB	PowerVR Series 5 (SGX)	540 @ 400 MHz (6.4 GFLOPs)	32-bit Dual-channel 400 MHz LPDDR2-800 (6.4 GB/s)	January 25, 2013	List: Xolo X500, Yolo, Acer Liquid C1, Asus FonePad, Etisalat E-20, Prestigio Multiphone 5430
Atom Z2760 (Cloverview, platform Clover Trail)	32 nm High-κ/metal gate	x86	Saltwell with HT	1.8 GHz dual-core	L1: 32 KB Instruction + 24 KB Data, L2: 512 KB (per core)	PowerVR Series 5 (SGX)	545 @ 533 MHz (8.5 GFLOPs)	32-bit Dual-channel 400 MHz LPDDR2-800 (6.4 GB/s)	Q4 2012	List: Asus VivoTab, Asus VivoTab Smart, HP Envy x2, HP ElitePad 900, Dell Latitude 10 Lenovo Thinkpad Tablet 2, Lenovo IdeaTab Lynx Samsung Series 5 Slate (Samsung ATIV Smart PC), Acer Iconia W510 ZTE V98, Acer Iconia W3, Samsung ATIV Tab 3
Atom Z2520 (Cloverview, platform Clover Trail+)	32 nm High-κ/metal gate	x86	Saltwell with HT	1.2 GHz dual-core	L1: 32 KB Instruction + 24 KB Data, L2: 512 KB (per core)	PowerVR Series 5XT (SGX)	544 MP2 @ 300 MHz (19.2 GFLOPs)	32-bit Dual-channel 533 MHz LPDDR2-1066 (8.5 GB/s)	2013	List: Asus Zenfone 4 (A400CG/A400CXG), Asus Zenfone 4 (A450CG), Asus Fonepad 7 (FE170CG/FE171CG), Asus Zenfone 5 (A501CG/A502CG), Asus Zenfone C (ZC451CG)
Atom Z2560 (Cloverview, platform Clover Trail+)	32 nm High-κ/metal gate	x86	Saltwell with HT	1.6 GHz dual-core	L1: 32 KB Instruction + 24 KB Data, L2: 512 KB (per core)	PowerVR Series 5XT (SGX)	544 MP2 @ 400 MHz (25.6 GFLOPs)	32-bit Dual-channel 533 MHz LPDDR2-1066 (8.5 GB/s)	Q2 2013	List: Asus Zenfone 5 (A500CG/A501CG), Asus Zenfone 6 (A601CG), Asus MeMO Pad FHD 10, Asus Zenfone 2 (ZE500CL), Asus Fonepad 7 (ME372CG/ME373CG), Asus ZenPad S 8.0 (Z580CA) Samsung Galaxy Tab 3 10.1-inch, Dell Venue 7, Geeksphone Revolution
Atom Z2580 (Cloverview, platform Clover Trail+)	32 nm High-κ/metal gate	x86	Saltwell with HT	2 GHz dual-core	L1: 32 KB Instruction + 24 KB Data, L2: 512 KB (per core)	PowerVR Series 5XT (SGX)	544 MP2 @ 533 MHz (34.1 GFLOPs)	32-bit Dual-channel 533 MHz LPDDR2-1066 (8.5 GB/s)	Q2 2013	List: ASUS Zenfone 5 (A500CG), ASUS Zenfone 6 (A600CG), Condor CTAB890RI, ASUS Fonepad Note FHD 6, Lenovo IdeaPhone K900, ZTE Grand X2 In, Asus Transformer Book Trio ZTE V975 GEEK, Ramos i8, i9, i10, i12, Teclast P89min, Dell Venue 8
Atom Z3680 (Valleyview, platform Bay Trail)	22 nm	x86-64	Silvermont	1.33 GHz (2 GHz burst frequency)	1 MB L2 Cache	Intel Gen 7 (Ivy Bridge)	311-667 MHz	64-bit single-channel 533 MHz LPDDR3-1066 (8.5 GB/s)	Q3 2013	
Atom Z3680D (Valleyview, platform Bay Trail)	22 nm	x86-64	Silvermont	1.33 GHz (2 GHz burst frequency) dual-core	1 MB L2 Cache	Intel Gen 7 (Ivy Bridge)	313-688 MHz	64-bit single-channel 666 MHz DDR3L-RS-1333 (10.6 GB/s)	Q3 2013	
Atom Z3740D (Valleyview, platform Bay Trail)	22 nm	x86-64	Silvermont	1.33 GHz (1.86 GHz burst frequency) quad-core	2 MB L2 Cache	Intel Gen 7 (Ivy Bridge)	313-688 MHz	64-bit single-channel 666 MHz DDR3L-RS-1333 (10.6 GB/s)	Q3 2013	List: Dell Venue 8 Pro, Ramos i10 Pro (dual OS), Ramos i8 Pro, Ramos i10 Note, Ramos i10S
Atom Z3740 (Valleyview, platform Bay Trail)	22 nm	x86-64	Silvermont	1.33 GHz (1.86 GHz burst frequency) quad-core	2 MB L2 Cache	Intel Gen 7 (Ivy Bridge)	311-667 MHz	64-bit dual-channel 533 MHz LPDDR3-1066 (17.1 GB/s)	Q3 2013	List: ASUS T100, Acer Iconia W4, Toshiba Encore, Lenovo Miix 2
Atom Z3745D (Valleyview, platform Bay Trail)	22 nm	x86-64	Silvermont	1.33 GHz (1.83 GHz burst frequency) quad-core	2 MB L2 Cache	Intel Gen 7 (Ivy Bridge)	313-792 MHz	64-bit single-channel 666 MHz DDR3L-RS-1333 (10.6 GB/s)	Q1 2014	
Atom Z3745 (Valleyview, platform Bay Trail)	22 nm	x86-64	Silvermont	1.33 GHz (1.86 GHz burst frequency) quad-core	2 MB L2 Cache	Intel Gen 7 (Ivy Bridge)	311-778 MHz	64-bit dual-channel 666 MHz LPDDR3-1066 (17.1 GB/s)	Q1 2014	List: ASUS MeMO Pad 7 (ME176C), ASUS MeMO Pad 8 (ME181C), Lenovo Yoga Tablet 2, Lenovo Yoga Tablet 2 Pro
Atom Z3770D (Valleyview, platform Bay Trail)	22 nm	x86-64	Silvermont	1.5 GHz (2.41 GHz burst frequency) quad-core	2 MB L2 Cache	Intel Gen 7 (Ivy Bridge)	313-688 MHz	64-bit single-channel 666 MHz DDR3L-RS-1333 (10.6 GB/s)	Q3 2013	
Atom Z3770 (Valleyview, platform Bay Trail)	22 nm	x86-64	Silvermont	1.46 GHz (2.39 GHz burst frequency) quad-core	2 MB L2 Cache	Intel Gen 7 (Ivy Bridge)	311-667 MHz	64-bit dual-channel 533 MHz LPDDR3-1066 (17.1 GB/s)	Q3 2013	List: Fujitsu Stylistic Q584, Dell Venue 11 Pro, HP Omni 10, Sharp Mebius Pad, Lenovo ThinkPad 8
Atom Z3775 (Valleyview, platform Bay Trail)	22 nm	x86-64	Silvermont	1.46 GHz (2.39 GHz burst frequency) quad-core	2 MB L2 Cache	Intel Gen 7 (Ivy Bridge)	311-778 MHz	64-bit dual-channel 533 MHz LPDDR3-1066 (17.1 GB/s)	Q1 2014	Asus Transformer Book T90 Chi
Atom Z3795 (Valleyview, platform Bay Trail)	22 nm	x86-64	Silvermont	1.59 GHz (2.39 GHz burst frequency) quad-core	2 MB L2 Cache	Intel Gen 7 (Ivy Bridge)	311-778 MHz	64-bit dual-channel 533 MHz LPDDR3-1066 (17.1 GB/s)	Q1 2014	HP ElitePad 1000 G2
Atom Z3735D (Valleyview, platform Bay Trail)	22 nm	x86-64	Silvermont	1.33 GHz (1.83 GHz burst frequency) quad-core	2 MB L2 Cache	Intel Gen 7 (Ivy Bridge)	311-667 MHz	64-bit single-channel 666 MHz DDR3L-RS-1333 (10.6 GB/s)	Q1 2014	Asus X205, Tesco Hudl2, MeeGoPad T02
Atom Z3736D (Valleyview, platform Bay Trail)	22 nm	x86-64	Silvermont	1.33 GHz (1.83 GHz burst frequency) quad-core	2 MB L2 Cache	Intel Gen 7 (Ivy Bridge)	311-646 MHz	64-bit single-channel DDR3L-RS 1333	Q1 2014	HP Pavilion x2
Atom Z3460 (Tangier, platform Merrifield)	22 nm	x86-64	Silvermont	1.60 GHz dual-core	1 MB L2 Cache	PowerVR Series6 (Rogue) G6400	400-457 MHz (117 GFLOPs)	LPDDR3-1066, dual-channel, 8.5 GB/s	Q2 2014	2014 Dell Venue 7
Atom Z3480 (Tangier, platform Merrifield)	22 nm	x86-64	Silvermont	2.13 GHz dual-core	1 MB L2 Cache	PowerVR Series6 (Rogue) G6400	457-533 MHz (136 GFLOPs)	LPDDR3-1066, dual-channel, 8.5 GB/s	Q2 2014	2014 Dell Venue 8
Atom Z3530 (Anniedale, platform Moorefield)	22 nm	x86-64	Silvermont	1.33 GHz quad-core	2 MB L2 Cache	PowerVR Series6 (Rogue) G6430	457 MHz (117 GFLOPs)	LPDDR3-1600, dual-channel, 12.8 GB/s	Q4 2014	List: Asus Fonepad 7 (FE375CXG) (Europe), Asus Fonepad 8 (FE380CG), Asus MeMO Pad 7 LTE (ME375CL)
Atom Z3560 (Anniedale, platform Moorefield)	22 nm	x86-64	Silvermont	1.83 GHz quad-core	2 MB L2 Cache	PowerVR Series6 (Rogue) G6430	457–533 MHz (136 GFLOPs)	LPDDR3-1600, dual-channel, 12.8 GB/s	Q4 2014	List: Asus Nexus Player, Asus Fonepad 7 (Asia), Asus MeMO Pad 7 (ME572CG), Asus Zenfone 2 (ZE550ML), Asus Zenfone 2 (ZE551ML)
Atom Z3570 (Anniedale, platform Moorefield)	22 nm	x86-64	Silvermont	2 GHz quad-core	2 MB L2 Cache	PowerVR Series6 (Rogue) G6430	457–640 MHz (155 GFLOPs)	LPDDR3-1600, dual-channel, 12.8 GB/s	Q3 2014	
Atom Z3580 (Anniedale, platform Moorefield)	22 nm	x86-64	Silvermont	2.33 GHz quad-core	2 MB L2 Cache	PowerVR Series6 (Rogue) G6430	457–533 MHz (136 GFLOPs)	LPDDR3-1600, dual-channel, 12.8 GB/s	Q4 2014	List: Asus MeMO Pad 8, Nokia N1, Dell Venue 8 7000, Asus Zenfone 2 (ZE551ML), Asus Zenfone 2 Deluxe (ZE551ML)
Atom Z3590 (Anniedale, platform Moorefield)	22 nm	x86-64	Silvermont	2.5 GHz quad-core	2 MB L2 Cache	PowerVR Series6 (Rogue) G6430	457–640 MHz (155 GFLOPs)	LPDDR3-1600, dual-channel, 12.8 GB/s	Q3 2015	Asus Zenfone 2 Deluxe Special Edition (ZE551ML) Asus Zenfone Zoom (ZX550ML/ZX551ML)
Atom x5-Z8300 (Cherryview, platform Cherry Trail)	14 nm	x86-64	Airmont	1.44 GHz (1.84 GHz burst frequency) quad-core	2 MB L2 Cache	Intel Gen 8 (Broadwell, 12 EU)	200–500 MHz (96 GFLOPs)	DDR3L-RS 1600, single-channel, 12.8 GB/s	Q2 2015	List: Toshiba Satellite Click 10, HP ENVY 8 Note, HP Pavilion x2 10t LattePanda, RDP Thinbook (original 14.1-inch - Nov-2016)
Atom x5-Z8350 (Cherryview, platform Cherry Trail)	14 nm	x86-64	Airmont	1.44 GHz (1.92 GHz burst frequency) quad-core	2 MB L2 Cache	Intel Gen 8 (Broadwell, 12 EU)	200–500 MHz (96 GFLOPs)	DDR3L-RS 1600, single-channel, 12.8 GB/s	Q1 2016	RDP Thinbook (new 14.1-inch mid-2017), RDP Thinbook (11.6-inch) Dell Wyse 3040
Atom x5-Z8500 (Cherryview, platform Cherry Trail)	14 nm	x86-64	Airmont	1.44 GHz (2.24 GHz burst frequency) quad-core	2 MB L2 Cache	Intel Gen 8 (Broadwell, 12 EU)	200–600 MHz (115 GFLOPs)	LPDDR3-1600, dual-channel, 25.6 GB/s	Q1 2015	List: ASUS Transformer Book T100HA, HP Pro Tablet 608 G1, Dell Venue 8 Pro 5000, Dell Venue 10 Pro 5000, Xiaomi Mi Pad 2
Atom x5-Z8550 (Cherryview, platform Cherry Trail)	14 nm	x86-64	Airmont	1.44 GHz (2.4 GHz burst frequency) quad-core	2 MB L2 Cache	Intel Gen 8 (Broadwell, 12 EU)	200–600 MHz (115 GFLOPs)	LPDDR3-1600, dual-channel, 25.6 GB/s	Q1 2016	Lenovo Yoga Book
Atom x7-Z8700 (Cherryview, platform Cherry Trail)	14 nm	x86-64	Airmont	1.6 GHz (2.4 GHz burst frequency) quad-core	2 MB L2 Cache	Intel Gen 8 (Broadwell, 16 EU)	200–600 MHz (153 GFLOPs)	LPDDR3-1600, dual-channel, 25.6 GB/s	Q1 2015	Surface 3, Acer Predator 8, GPD Win
Atom x7-Z8750 (Cherryview, platform Cherry Trail)	14 nm	x86-64	Airmont	1.6 GHz (2.56 GHz burst frequency) quad-core	2 MB L2 Cache	Intel Gen 8 (Broadwell, 16 EU)	200–600 MHz (153 GFLOPs)	LPDDR3-1600, dual-channel, 25.6 GB/s	Q1 2016	GPD Pocket
Broxton, platforms Morganfield and Willow Trail	14 nm	x86-64	Goldmont	—N/a		Intel Gen 9 (Skylake)			2016	

== Merrifield and Moorefield smartphone platforms ==
In Q1 2014, Intel launched its fully Android compatible smartphone platform Merrifield based on a 22 nm SoC. It was followed by its platform refresh Moorefield in Q4 2014.

== Operating system support on Cloverview ==
While Penwell SoC supports, in addition to Microsoft Windows, both Linux and Android operating systems, Intel has announced that it will not provide support for Linux on Cloverview family of Atom systems-on-a-chip. This announcement has caused strong negative reaction from open source proponents. A few days later Intel issued a statement saying that it h27x0 series). The Clover Trail+ platform was later released targeting Google Android (z25x0 series).

The last version of Windows 10 to support Cloverview is the Anniversary Update (version 1607) until January 10, 2023 when the last public security patch KB5022289 was released; later versions of Windows 10 and all versions of Windows 11 cannot be installed.

== New power states on Cloverview ==
Z2760 Cloverview has introduced two new power states: S0i1 and S0i3. The S0i1 state is intended to be used when the display is on but the user does not actively interact with the device; it consumes power in mW range, and can be entered/left in microseconds. The S0i3 state is intended to be used when the device display is off; it consumes power in microwatt range, and can be entered/left in milliseconds. As a result, Intel claims longer standby battery life (up to three weeks for a typical tablet).

== Roadmap ==
In May 2013, Intel revealed the Silvermont microarchitecture, which is based on the 22 nm process technology. Silvermont was the foundation for Atoms system-on-chip (SoC) products for smartphones, tablets, microservers and network equipment, such as Merrifield, Moorefield, Bay Trail, Avoton and Rangeley SoC.

Intel's Merrifield and Moorefield smartphone platforms debuted in 2014, both of which are built on top of Silvermont. Moorefield also included quad-core option in order to provide power-hungry smartphones.

Following Silvermont, the 14 nm Airmont microarchitecture appeared in Silvermont tablets and Braswell entry-level computers.The 14 nm Airmont microarchitecture followed Silvermont in the products, such as Silvermont tablets and Braswell entry level computers. In 2015, Atom x5 and x7 processors were launched on Cherry Trail, and newer graphics have been introduced when compared to the previous generation of Bay Trail.

As a restructuring of Intel's business, the company announced in April 2016 the cancellation of the Broxton platform and several mobile projects called SoFIA (System-on-Chip), aimed at mobile devices. The company kept working on Atom-based designs for other categories of products, such as low-power PCs and embedded applications.

=== Silvermont Microarchitecture (2013) Atom SoCs included ===
- Tangier (Merrifield): Designed for smartphones.
- Valleyview (Bay Trail): Targeted at tablets, featuring Intel's 7th generation GPU, which provided a 4–7× improvement in performance over previous Atom GPUs.
- Rangeley and Avoton: Developed for networking and storage applications, part of the Edisonville platform.

=== Airmont Microarchitecture (2014) ===
Airmont is the 14 nm die shrink of the Silvermont microarchitecture, with the following Atom platforms:

- Moorefield: Developed for smartphones.
- Cherry Trail: Designed for tablets, using the Cherryview SoC.

=== Goldmont and Goldmont Plus Microarchitectures (2016–2019) ===
Intel introduced the Goldmont (2016) and Goldmont Plus (2018) microarchitectures, featuring improvements in efficiency and performance. Key platforms included:

- Apollo Lake (2016): Targeted at low-power laptops, Chromebooks, and embedded systems.
- Gemini Lake (2017): An enhancement over Apollo Lake, supporting higher clock speeds and improved integrated graphics.

The planned Morganfield (smartphones) and Willow Trail (tablets) platforms, based on the Broxton SoC, were canceled in 2016 as Intel shifted its Atom focus toward embedded and IoT devices.

=== Tremont Microarchitecture (2019) ===
In 2019, Intel introduced the Tremont microarchitecture, which improved instructions-per-cycle (IPC) efficiency. Tremont-based Atom processors included:

- Elkhart Lake (2020): Targeted at industrial IoT and embedded applications.[8]
- Jasper Lake (2021): Designed for low-power consumer laptops and Chromebooks.[9]

=== Alder Lake-N and Future Atom Successors (2023–present) ===
Introduced in 2023, Alder Lake-N processors succeed the Atom series, utilizing Gracemont efficiency cores for budget-friendly laptops, Chromebooks, and entry-level desktops. Unlike previous Atom architectures, they integrate technologies from Intel’s mainstream Core series, improving performance and efficiency.

Intel continues advancing low-power SoC architectures, incorporating Intel 4, Intel 3, and Intel 20A process nodes with RibbonFET and PowerVia technologies.

Subsequent developments integrate Atom-class efficiency cores into hybrid architectures:

- Meteor Lake (2023): Intel 4, modular tile-based design, Crestmont efficiency cores, first use of EUV lithography.
- Arrow Lake (2024): Expected to refine performance-per-watt optimizations.
- Lunar Lake (2025): Projected 3× AI performance improvement over predecessors, targeting AI-driven applications.

These processors represent Intel's continued iteration of its low-power CPU architectures, with a focus on efficiency and AI capabilities.

== Similar SoCs ==
- Apple silicon by Apple
- Exynos by Samsung
- Jaguar and Puma by AMD
- NovaThor by ST-Ericsson
- OMAP by Texas Instruments
- Snapdragon by Qualcomm
- Tegra by Nvidia
- R-Car by Renesas
- Dolphin by Telechips
- Vortex86 by DMP Electronics

== See also ==
- Mobile Internet device (Intel MID platforms)
- List of Intel Atom processors
- Bonnell and Saltwell microarchitectures
- Silvermont and Airmont microarchitectures
- List of Intel graphics processing units
- Allwinner Technology
- Rockchip
- MIPS architecture
- Intel 80386EX (one of Intel's first SoCs)
- Tolapai (Intel's earlier SoC not marketed as Atom)
- Intel Quark
- Intel Edison
