= ThinkPad 10 =

Tablet computers

Lenovo ThinkPad 10 refers to two generations of 10-inch business-oriented tablet computers manufactured by Lenovo.

Along with the ThinkPad 8, the first-generation ThinkPad 10, announced in May 2014, is part of the third-generation of ThinkPad branded tablet PCs, succeeding the ThinkPad Tablet 2. It uses Windows 8.1 as its operating system and supports a free upgrade to Windows 10.

A second generation of the ThinkPad 10 was announced in May 2015. It will come with Windows 10 out of the box.

== Design and performance ==
Both generations of the Lenovo ThinkPad 10 have the same design and largely identical specifications - a 10.1-inch screen size with a resolution of 1920 × 1200 (for a 16:10 aspect ratio). They both use low-energy Intel Atom quad-core processors, which differ between generations: the first generation employs a 1.6GHz Bay Trail (Z3795) processor with 7th Gen Intel HD Graphics, while the second generation uses a newer, faster 2.2 GHz or 2.4 GHz Cherry Trail (Z8500 or Z8700) processor with 8th Gen Intel HD Graphics.

The ThinkPad 10 comes in various configurations, such as 64 and 128 GB variants with 2 or 4 gigabytes of RAM, and 32-bit and 64-bit versions of Microsoft Windows. An 8 megapixel back camera and a 2 megapixel front camera for making video calls are included. Stylus support (with a full-sized pen with eraser tip, the first device since the ThinkPad X Series tablets with such) and cellular data are also options. The battery is rated at 33 watt hours, while Lenovo claims a battery life of ten hours. Tests conducted by Australia's PC World showed a battery life of just under seven hours while playing a 1080p video at full brightness with Wi-Fi on. A micro-HDMI port and a USB 2.0 port (USB 3.0 on second generation) are located on the edge of the device.

== Accessories ==
Lenovo put a large emphasis on the wide range of accessories available for the device. They released a keyboard case (Ultrabook Keyboard) for the ThinkPad 10 with chiclet-style keys. Another keyboard case (Touch Case) is folio-style and has a flat keyboard similar to the Microsoft Surface. Both keyboard cases have a multitouch-enabled touchpad and a slot for the stylus. A third case is ruggedized, has an adjustable hand strap on the back, gaskets to cover ports, and a stylus holder; designed to dock and charge the tablet without being removed. A larger version of the QuickShot case for the ThinkPad 8 tablet is available; It automatically opens the camera app when opened. A ThinkPad Tablet Dock is available that adds three USB 3.0 ports, a full-sized HDMI output, and an ethernet jack. Styli are also sold separately.

== Reviews ==
In a review for CNET, Dan Ackerman said, "The key selling point of the new ThinkPad 10, a 10-inch Windows 8 tablet, is not the tablet hardware itself, but the large ecosystem of optional accessories, designed to turn the slate into a laptop, desktop, or even a display kiosk. Lenovo's plan suggests the key to successful Windows tablet is the ability to also use it as an everyday PC, and that's especially true for the business users who stick to the venerable ThinkPad brand."

In a review for SlashGear, Brittany Hillen wrote, "Lenovo's Thinkpad 10 is a wonderful little Windows tablet, and the keyboard and dock accessories expand its usefulness ten-fold, allowing it to double as a workstation of sorts when needed. The display is exceptionally crisp and bright, and the keyboard dock is very functional -- you can adjust to using it immediately, rather than training your fingers to the often spongy feel of many tablet keyboards. There are no complaints about the Thinkpad 10; if you need a tablet for business or for tasks Android isn't quite up for, Lenovo's newest offering is an excellent choice."

In a review for Australia's PC World, Elias Plastiras wrote, "If processing your work at Intel Core speeds is not a necessity for your business needs, then this Intel Atom-based tablet is well worth your consideration. We like the overall combination of the light weight, built-in ports, the supplied digitiser pen, and the Full HD screen. It's a highly usable product for basic tasks, and the accessories on offer can turn it into something more than just a typical slate. We just wish more storage space was standard, and that the screen wasn't so reflective."
