= Intel Galileo =

Arduino-certified single-board computer

Intel Galileo Gen. 1
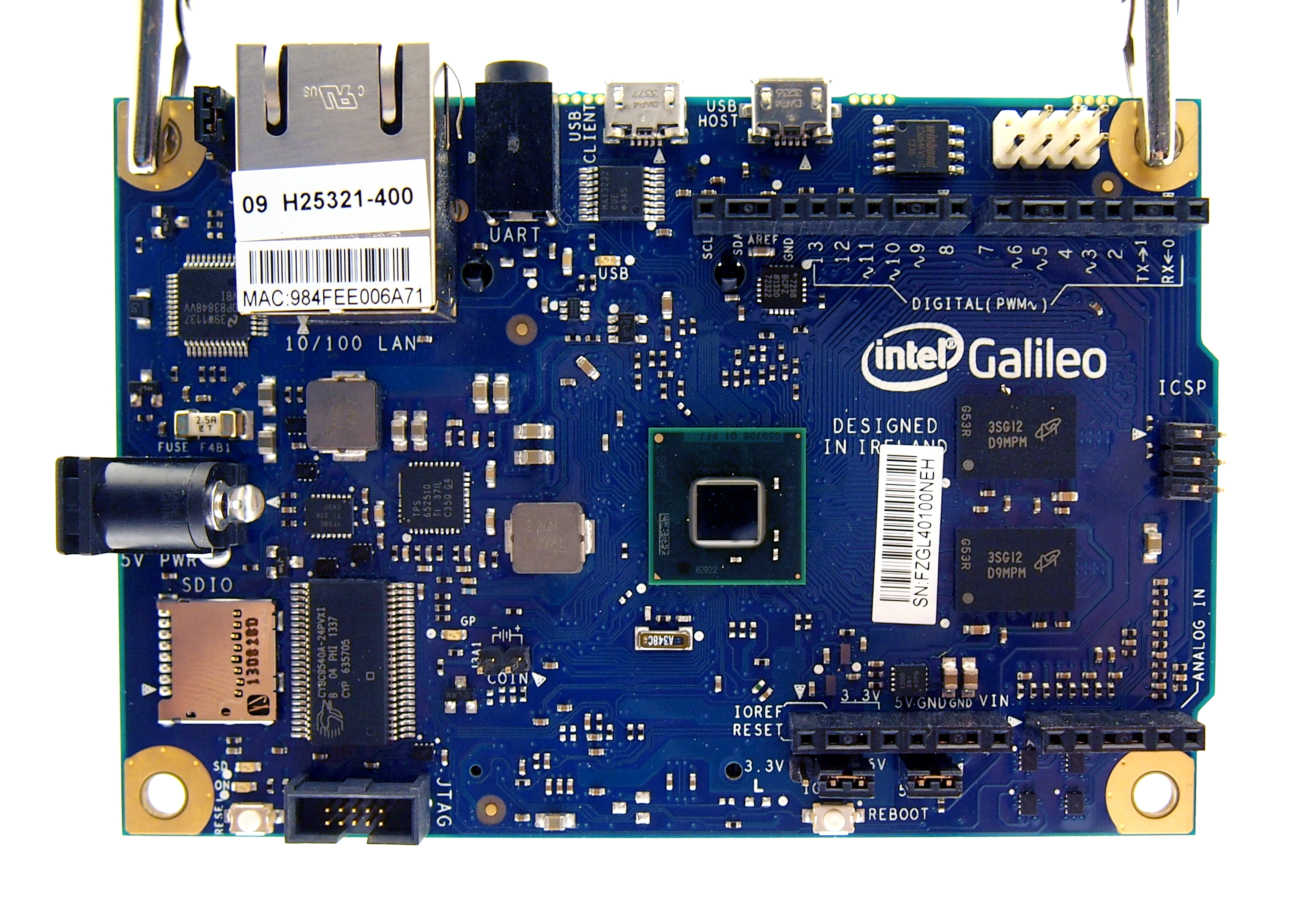
- "Intel Galileo Gen. 1"
- Developer: Intel Corporation
- Type: Single-board computer
- Released: 17 October 2013
- Introductory price: US$70
- Discontinued: 19 June 2017
- Operating system: Linux (Yocto Project based Linux)
- CPU: Intel Quark X1000 400 MHz
- Memory: 256 MB
- Storage: Micro SD card slot (Micro SD or SDHC card)
- Power: 15 W
- Website: www.intel.com

Intel Galileo Gen. 2
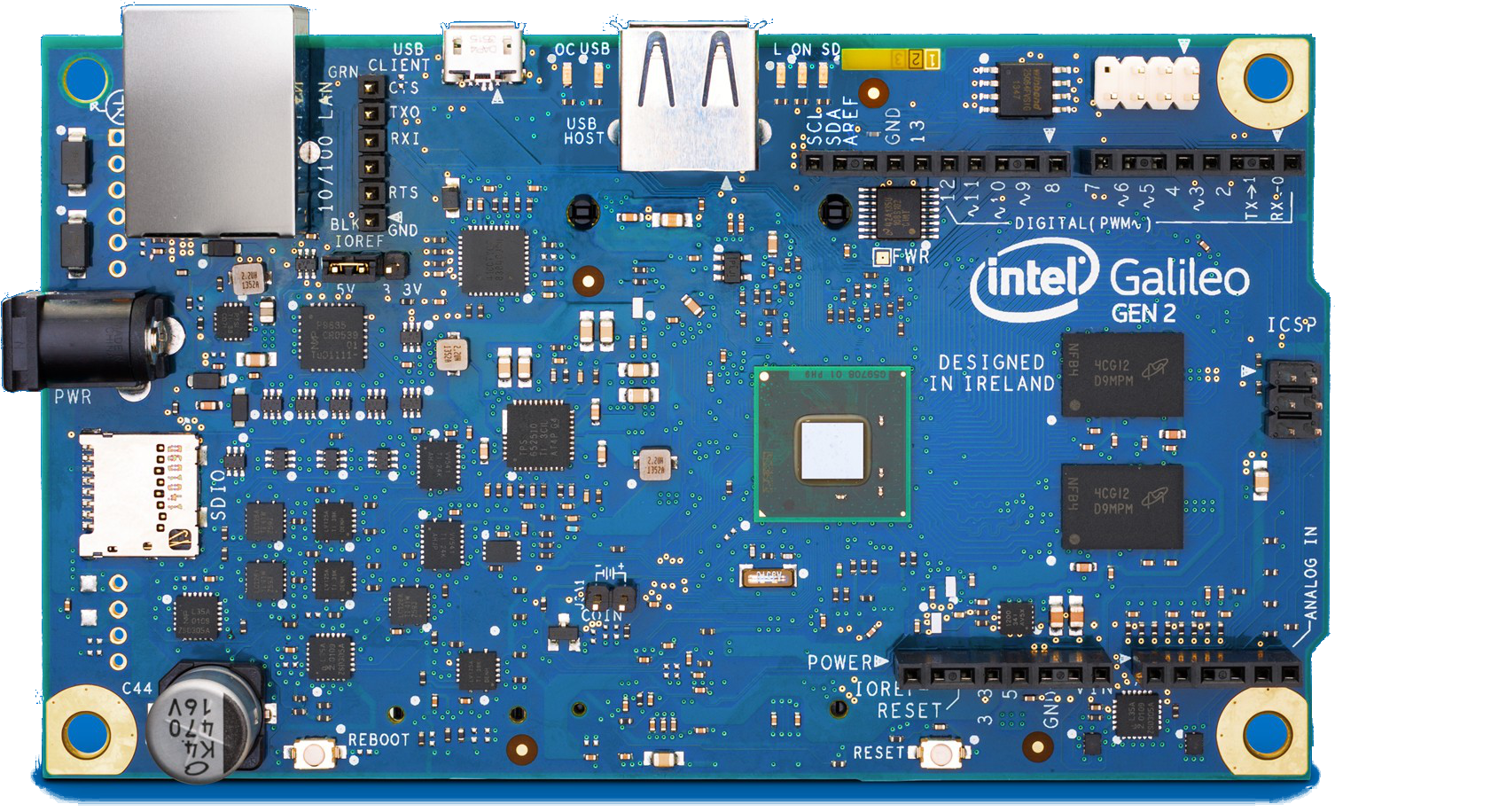
- "Intel Galileo Gen. 2"
- Developer: Intel Corporation
- Type: Single-board computer
- Released: 10 July 2014
- Discontinued: 16 June 2017
- Operating system: Linux
- CPU: Intel Quark X1000 32-bit 400 MHz
- Memory: 256 MB
- Storage: Flash Memory 8M, EEPROM 8 kb, Micro SD card slot up to 32GB
- Power: 15 W
- Website: www.intel.com

Intel Galileo is the first in a line of Arduino-certified development boards based on Intel x86 architecture and is designed for the maker and education communities. Intel released two versions of Galileo, referred to as Gen 1 and Gen 2. These development boards are sometimes called "Breakout boards".

The board was discontinued on 19 June 2017.

== Technical specifications ==
Intel Galileo combines Intel technology with support for Arduino ready-made hardware expansion cards (called "shields") and the Arduino software development environment and libraries. The development board runs an open source Linux operating system with the Arduino software libraries, enabling re-use of existing software, called "sketches". The sketch runs every time the board is powered. Intel Galileo can be programmed through OS X, Microsoft Windows and Linux host operating software. The board is also designed to be hardware and software compatible with the Arduino shield ecosystem.

Intel Galileo features the Intel Quark SoC X1000, the first product from the Intel Quark technology family of low-power, small-core products. Intel Quark represents Intel's attempt to compete within markets such as the Internet of Things and wearable computing. Designed in Ireland, the Quark SoC X1000 is a 32-bit, single core, single-thread, Pentium (P54C/i586) instruction set architecture (ISA)-compatible CPU, operating at speeds up to 400 MHz. The Quark is seen by some as Intel's answer to ARM, the processor design featured in smartphones and other single-board computers.

At a clock speed of 400 MHz, together with 256 Mb of DDR3 RAM and 8 Mb flash memory, the Galileo is much more powerful than competing Arduino boards. The Mega 2560, for example, has a clock speed of 16 MHz, 8 Kb RAM and 256 Kb flash memory. It would be more appropriate to compare the Galileo to another single-board computer, such as the Raspberry Pi. The latest iteration, the Pi 3 Model B, replaced the Pi 2 Model B in February 2016. It is more powerful than the older Galileo Gen 2, featuring a 1.2 GHz CPU and 1 GB RAM. The Pi, however, does not have any flash memory.

Both Galileo boards support the Arduino shield ecosystem. Unlike most Arduino boards, the Intel boards support both 3.3 V and 5 V shields. The Intel development board comes with several computing industry standard I/O interfaces. The support for PCI Express means that Wifi, Bluetooth or GSM cards can be plugged in to the board. It also enables usage of solid state drives with the Galileo.

The 10/100 Mbit Ethernet support enables the board to be connected to a LAN. It also enables accessing the Linux shell. The boards further support Micro SD, which means the available storage can be extended by up to 32 G. Other I/O interfaces include ACPI, USB 2.0 device and EHCI/OHCI USB host ports, high-speed UART, RS-232 serial port, programmable 8 MB NOR flash, and a JTAG port for easy debug.

Although the Galileo shipped with Linux, it was possible to have a custom version of Windows on both the Gen 1 and the Gen 2. This support was, however, suspended by Microsoft on 30 November 2015. Microsoft cited hardware concerns, with some specifically attributing it to the low clock speed of the Galileo.

The Galileo supports the Arduino IDE running atop an unmodified Linux software stack, supported by a common open source tool chain. The board comes pre-loaded with an SPI image of Linux. Although this version (Yocto 1.4 Poky Linux) has very limited features (e.g. it does not include a Wi-Fi module), it does not require any storage devices to be added. Intel also provides more functional versions of Linux for the boards. The "SD-Card" image can be downloaded and loaded onto the board via a Micro SD card. It includes, among a multitude of modules, a Wi-Fi module, support for OpenCV to enable computer vision, ALSA for sound processing and Node.js for JavaScript capabilities. A more advanced IoT DevKit version is also available to enable complex IoT projects, adding for example support for OpenCV-Python.

The Raspberry Pi (excluding the Raspberry Pi 5), as well as most boards from Arduino, does not have an onboard real time clock. The Galileo boards have a real time clock, requiring only a 3 V coin cell battery. The boards can therefore keep accurate time without being connected to either a power source or internet.

The Galileo can be seen as truly open source, as both the schematics and the source code are freely available for download without a software license agreement. However, some argued that the hardware shouldn't be designated open source if the processor core isn't also made open-source.

== Arduino ecosystem ==
The Arduino ecosystem has three "levels":

1. "Arduino" is manufactured and distributed by Arduino.
2. "AtHeart" identifies any board which is manufactured using an Arduino-supported processor.
3. "Certified" means that the board is supported by the Arduino platform, but does not use an Arduino-supported processor.

The Galileo falls into the third category. Although it is the lowest level in the Arduino ecosystem, it still means that Galileo boards can be programmed using the official Arduino IDE, bought on the Arduino online shop and is compatible with Arduino peripherals such as shields.

== Sales and adoption ==
Intel does not publish sales data on its products.

In an effort to boost the ecosystem of their Quark architecture, Intel gave away 50,000 Galileo Gen 1's when it was launched. In 2014, Microsoft also handed out Galileo boards to people who signed up for its IoT program.

On 30 November 2015, Microsoft suspended support for Galileo. While it is unclear what effect this had on the sales numbers of the boards, it meant that developers creating projects for Microsoft's Windows 10 IoT Core had to move to either the Raspberry Pi 2 or 3 or the MinnowBoard MAX.

On 16 June 2017 Intel announced that the 'End of Life' and last shipment date for the Galileo range is 16 December 2017.

== Difference between Gen 1 and Gen 2 ==
Intel Galileo Gen 2 Is similar to Gen 1 with the following changes:

- Replaces the RS-232 console port (audio jack) with a 1x6-pin 3.3 V USB TTL UART header
- Adds 12-bit pulse-width modulation (PWM)
- Console UART1 redirection to Arduino headers
- Power over Ethernet (PoE) capability (Requires installation of Silvertel Ag9712-2BR/FL power module)
- A power regulation system that accepts power supplies from 7 V to 15 V.
- Improved PWM control line means finer resolution for movement control.

Feature	GEN 1	GEN 2
SoC	Intel Quark X1000 32-bit 400 MHz	Intel Quark X1000 32-bit 400 MHz
Power (Barrel)	5 V	7 V-15 V
Power (PoE)	No	Yes (Requires installation of Silvertel Ag9712-BR2/FL power module)

== See also ==
- Intel Edison
