= Intel AZ210 =

Smartphone model

Intel AZ210 (Intel AZ510)
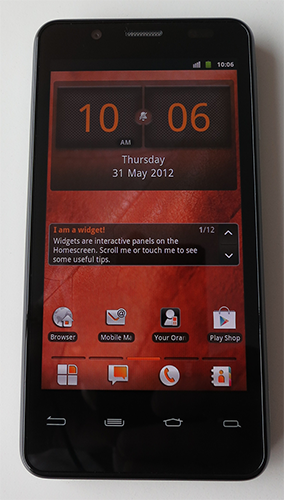
- Manufacturer: Intel via Gigabyte
- Type: Smartphone
- First released: April 22, 2012; 14 years ago (India); June 6, 2012; 14 years ago (United Kingdom); August 23, 2012; 13 years ago (Russia)
- Compatible networks: GSM/GPRS/EDGE 850/900/1800/1900, UMTS/HSPA 850/900/1900/2100
- Dimensions: 123 mm (4.8 in) H 63 mm (2.5 in) W 10 mm (0.39 in) D
- Weight: 117 g (4.1 oz)
- Operating system: Android 4.0.4 Ice-Cream Sandwich (previously 2.3 Gingerbread)
- CPU: Intel Atom 1.6 GHz Z2460 with HyperThreading
- GPU: PowerVR SGX 540 @ 400 MHz
- Memory: 1 GB RAM
- Removable storage: 16 GB internal, memory card not supported
- Battery: 1460 mAh
- Rear camera: 8.0 megapixels with 1080p video recording and 8x digital zoom
- Front camera: 1.3 megapixels with 720p video recording
- Display: 4.03 in (102 mm) capacitative touchscreen, 1024 × 600, 16,777,216 colour TFT
- Connectivity: micro-USB, HDMI 2.0, 3.5mm Audio Jack, Bluetooth 2.1, Wi-Fi 802.11 b/g/n, aGPS, GLONASS, NFC, DLNA, USB On-The-Go
- Data inputs: On-screen QWERTY keyboard

The Intel AZ210, also marketed as XOLO X900 (Intel AZ510) in India, Orange San Diego in the United Kingdom and Megafon Mint in Russia, is a phone manufactured by Taiwanese OEM Gigabyte for Intel.

It features an Intel Atom processor Z2460 processor running Android 4.0.4 (Ice Cream Sandwich). It is Europe and India's first Android device powered by an Intel processor.

== Launch and availability ==
The device was first launched in India as the XOLO X900 (Intel AZ510) on 22 April 2012 priced at Rs. 25,000. as of May 2012. Shortly after, the device launched in the United Kingdom & France on June 6, 2012, as the Orange San Diego (Intel AZ210), running on the Orange network with the Russian variation following on August 22, 2012, which is known as the Megafon Mint.

== Hardware ==
The device uses an Intel Atom SoC Atom Z2460 (codename Medfield), which contains a single-core Intel Atom CPU with HyperThreading running at 1.6 GHz. The device has 1 GB of dedicated RAM, 16 GB of internal storage and a 4.03 inch display with a resolution of WSVGA (1024x600) supporting 16 Million colors covered by Gorilla Glass.

The device features stereo speakers of 0.3 Watt output each and dual microphones with an 'Ambient Noise Cancellation' feature.

On the back of the device is an 8 MP camera with single LED-flash featuring auto focus and touch focus. A dedicated camera key is provided for easy access. The camera supports up to 8x of digital zoom. It can record videos in full HD 1080p, while the front camera (for video call or video chat) can record videos in HD 720p. The phone supports a burst mode of capturing up to 10 (15 FPS) images per second. Also, it supports Auto, Sports, Portrait, Landscape, Night, Night Portrait, Fireworks, Text modes.

The device also includes Accelerometer, Gyroscope, Magnetometer, Ambient light sensor, and Proximity sensor.

== Media support ==
Intel AZ210 comes loaded with Android Video Player plus doubleTwist. The system supports MPEG4, 3GPP, WMC, H.264, VP8 video codecs and MP3, MIDI, WAV, 3GPP audio codecs natively. It has the capability to play the videos full HD 1080p resolutions at 30 fps.

== Connectivity ==
Intel AZ210 supports a number of connectivity features. It has a micro-USB port which runs at USB 2.0 speed for PC connectivity. Bluetooth ver. 2.1. It supports Wi-Fi 802.11 b/g/n. It also features near field communication (NFC). The phone supports Wi-Fi tethering. A micro-HDMI port is provided to connect the device to a supported HDTV. A 3.5 mm audio jack is provided to connect the headset.

== Network ==
Frequency Bands: GSM: 850/900/1800/1900, WCDMA/UMTS/HSPA: 850/900/1900/2100, HSPA+: 850/900/1900/2100. EDGE/GPRS: Class 10. HSPA+ speeds are up to 21 Mbit/s (Download) and up to 5.7 Mbit/s (Upload).

== Android operating system ==
The Intel AZ210 originally shipped with Android 2.3.7 (Gingerbread) which was updated to Android 4.0.4 Ice Cream Sandwich via OTA. The Russian version is customised for the intended market and uses SPB Shell 3D launcher and Megafon carrier specific apps.

== Third party support ==
Various mods and tweaks have been created by the Android community at Modaco to improve performance of the device and enable features such as the hidden microSD slot.

== Advertisement controversy ==
In June 2012, a television advertisement for the Orange San Diego was broadcast on British television and featured a fast car in computer generated imagery. Richard Noble claimed that the car was a representation of ThrustSSC, a land speed record car that broke the sound barrier in 1997, and thus these companies had used his intellectual property without permission, putting the future of the successor Bloodhound SSC project in doubt. The Advertising Standards Authority rejected the Bloodhound team's complaint, claiming that intellectual property disputes were not in its remit. According to BBC News technology correspondent Rory Cellan-Jones, Intel and Orange responded that their production team had researched different styles of "superfast vehicles" and developed their own Orange-branded land speed car, and that the advertisement and phone were not connected to Noble or Bloodhound SSC.
