= Intel Edison =

Computer-on-module by Intel

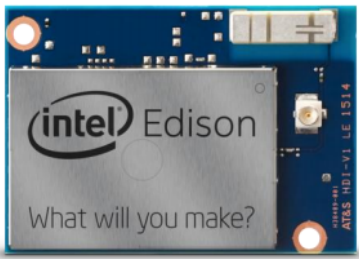
- Developer: Intel Corporation
- Type: Computer-on-module
- Released: Q3'14
- Discontinued: June 19, 2017
- CPU: Atom 2-Core (Silvermont) @ 500 MHz
- Memory: (LPDDR3 1 GB)
- Storage: 4 GB EMMC
- Website: software.intel.com/en-us/iot/hardware/edison

The Intel Edison is a computer-on-module that was offered by Intel as a development system for wearable devices and Internet of Things devices. The system was initially announced to be the same size and shape as an SD card and containing a dual-core Intel Quark x86 CPU at 400 MHz communicating via Bluetooth and Wi-Fi. A later announcement changed the CPU to a 500 MHz Silvermont dual-core Intel Atom CPU, and in September 2014 a second version of Edison was shown at IDF, which was bigger and thicker than a standard SD card.

The board was discontinued on June 19, 2017.

== First version ==
Its launch was announced at CES in January 2014. Intel CEO Brian Krzanich showed a demo of a baby monitoring system (Nursery2.0) which was created using Intel Edison. He also announced that the Wolfram Language and Mathematica will be available on the Intel Edison and that the device will be able to run Linux.

== Second version ==
In March 2014, Intel announced changes in the Intel Edison project and the second version of the board was presented in September 2014. Its dimensions are 35.5 x 25 x 3.9 mm, with components on both sides. The board's main SoC is a 22 nm Intel Atom "Tangier" (Z34XX) that includes two Atom Silvermont cores running at 500 MHz and one Intel Quark core at 100 MHz (for executing RTOS ViperOS). The SoC has 1 GB RAM integrated on package. There is also 4 GB eMMC flash on board, Wi-Fi, Bluetooth 4 and USB controllers. The board has 70-pin dense connector (Hirose DF40) with USB, SD, UARTs, GPIOs. The price of the device is around 50 USD. It runs Yocto Linux with development support for Arduino IDE, Eclipse (C, C++, Python), and Intel XDK (NodeJS, HTML5).

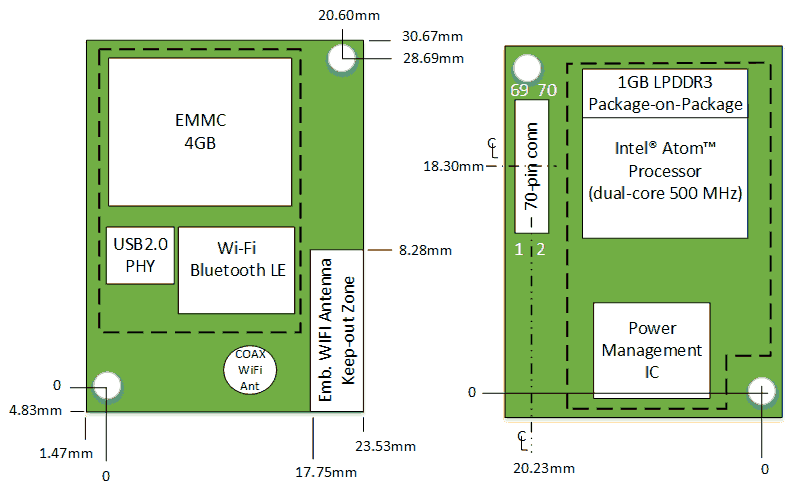

== Interface connector ==
The connector on Intel Edison is a Hirose 70-pin DF40 Series "header" connector. (Hirose part number: DF40C-70DP-0.4V(51)). It exports many signals (USB, GPIOs, SPI, I²C, PWM, etc.).

The mating Hirose connector on an expansion board is the "receptacle" connector and is available in three different heights (1.5 mm, 2.0 mm, 3.0 mm).

== Development boards ==
=== Arduino board ===
Arduino Uno Compatible Board for Edison Module

Intel Released an Arduino Uno compatible board (with only 4 PWM pins instead of 6) that accepts the Intel Edison module. Newer revisions have 6 PWM pins.

Board I/O Features:

- 20 digital input/output pins, including 6 pins as PWM outputs
- 6 analog inputs
- 1 UART (Rx/Tx)
- 1 I²C
- 1 ICSP (In-system programming) 6-pin header (SPI)
- Micro USB device connector OR (via mechanical switch) dedicated standard size USB host Type-A connector
- Micro USB device (connected to UART)
- SD card connector
- DC power jack (7 to 15VDC input)

=== Intel breakout board ===
Intel Edison Break Out Board

Intel released a breakout board that is twice the area of the Intel Edison module and is designed for prototyping with open-source hardware and software.

- Exposes native 1.8 V I/O of the Edison module
- 0.1” grid I/O array of through-hole solder points
- USB OTG with USB Micro Type-AB connector
- USB OTG power switch
- Battery Charger
- USB to device UART bridge with USB Micro
- Type-B connector
- DC power supply jack (7 V – 15 V) DC input

The table below lists the signals from the Edison Module that are routed to the four breakout connector (J17-J20). The figure below shows the location of each connector.

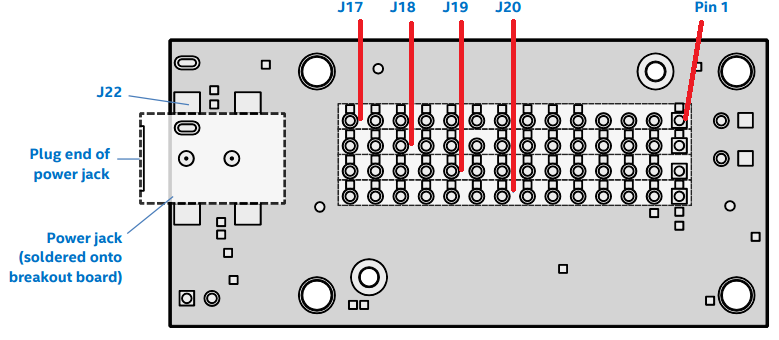
Intel Edison Breakout Board - Breakout Connectors

Pin	Function	Alternate Function	Description	Pin	Function	Alternate Function	Description
J17 - pin 1	GP182_PWM2		GPIO capable of PWM output.	J18 - pin 1	GP13_PWM1		GPIO capable of PWM output.
J17 - pin 2	NC		No Connect	J18 - pin 2	GP165		GPIO
J17 -pin 3	NC		No Connect	J18 - pin 3	GPI_PWRBTN_N		Power button input.
J17 - pin 4	VIN		7 to 15 V.	J18 - pin 4	MSIC_SLP_CLK2		32 kHz sleep clock.
J17 - pin 5	GP135	UART2_TX	GPIO, UART2 transmit output.	J18 - pin 5	V_VBAT_BKUP		RTC backup battery input.
J17 - pin 6	RCVR_MODE		Firmware recovery mode.	J18 - pin 6	GP19	I2C1_SCL	GPIO,IC21 SCL output open collector.
J17 - pin 7	GP27	I2C6_SCL	GPIO,IC26 SCL output open collector.	J18 - pin 7	GP12_PWM0		GPIO capable of PWM output.
J17 - pin 8	GP20	I2C1_SDA	GPIO, I2C1 data open collector.	J18 - pin 8	GP183_PWM3		GPIO capable of PWM output.
J17 - pin 9	GP28	I2C6_SDA	GPIO, I2C6 data open collector.	J18 - pin 9	NC		No Connect
J17 - pin 10	GP111	SSP5_FS1	GPIO, SSP2 chip select 2 output.	J18 - pin 10	GP110	SSP5_FS0	GPIO, SSP1 chip select 2 output.
J17 - pin 11	GP109	SSP5_CLK	GPIO, SSP5 clock output.	J18 - pin 11	GP114	SSP5_RX	GPIO, SSP5 receive data input.
J17 - pin 12	GP115	SSP5_TXD	GPIO, SSP5 transmit data output.	J18 - pin 12	GP129	UART1_RTS	GPIO, UART1 ready to send output.
J17 - pin 13	OSC_CLK_OUT_0		High speed clock output.	J18 - pin 13	GP130	UART1_RX	GPIO, UART1 receive data input.
J17 - pin 14	GP128	UART1_CTS	GPIO, UART1 clear to send input.	J18 - pin 14	4 FW_RCVR		Firmware recovery, active high on boot.
J19 - pin 1	NC		No connect.	J20 - pin 1	V_VSYS		System input power.
J19 - pin 2	V_V1P80		System 1.8 V I/O output power.	J20 - pin 2	V_V3P30		System 3.3 V output.
J19 - pin 3	GND		Ground.	J20 - pin 3	GP134	UART2_RX	UART2 Rx (input).
J19 - pin 4	GP44	ALS_INT_N	GPIO, Ambient light Sensor interrupt input.	J20 - pin 4	GP45	COMPASS_DRDY	GPIO, compass data ready input.
J19 - pin 5	GP46	ACCELEROMETER_INT_1	GPIO, accelerometer interrupt input.	J20 - pin 5	GP47	ACCELEROMETER_INT_2	GPIO, accelerometer interrupt input 2.
J19 - pin 6	GP48	GYRO_DRDY	GPIO, gyro data ready input.	J20 - pin 6	GP49	GYRO_INT	GPIO, gyro interrupt input.
J19 - pin 7	RESET_OUT#		System reset out low.	J20 - pin 7	GP15		GPIO.
J19 - pin 8	GP131	UART1_TX	GPIO, UART 1 Tx output.	J20 - pin 8	GP84	SD_CLK_FB	GPIO, SD clock feedback input.
J19 - pin 9	GP14	AUDIO_CODEC_INT	GPIO, audio codec interrupt input.	J20 - pin 9	GP42	SSP2_RXD	GPIO, SSP2 Rx data input.
J19 - pin 10	GP40	SSP2_CLK	GPIO, SSP2 clock output.	J20 - pin 10	GP41	SSP2_FS	GPIO, SSP2 frame sync output.
J19 - pin 11	GP43	SSP2_TXD	GPIO, SSP2 transmit data output.	J20 - pin 11	GP78	SD_CLK	GPIO, SD clock output.
J19 - pin 12	GP77	SD_CDN	GPIO, SD card detect low input	J20 - pin 12	GP79	SD_CMD	GPIO, SD command.
J19 - pin 13	GP82	SD_DAT2	GPIO, SD data 2	J20 - pin 13	GP80	SD_DAT0	GPIO, SD data 0.
J19 - pin 14	GP83	SD_DAT3	GPIO, SD data 3	J20 - pin 14	GP81	SD_DAT1	GP81 SD data 1.

=== Modulowo board ===
In October 2015, Modulowo published information about the development kit Modulowo Explore E for Intel Edison. Development Board allows for quick prototyping and design new solutions and adding sensors, controllers lights, motor drivers, GPS modules, communication modules and more.

== See also ==
- Intel Galileo
