= Asus Fonepad =

2013 tablet computer by Asus

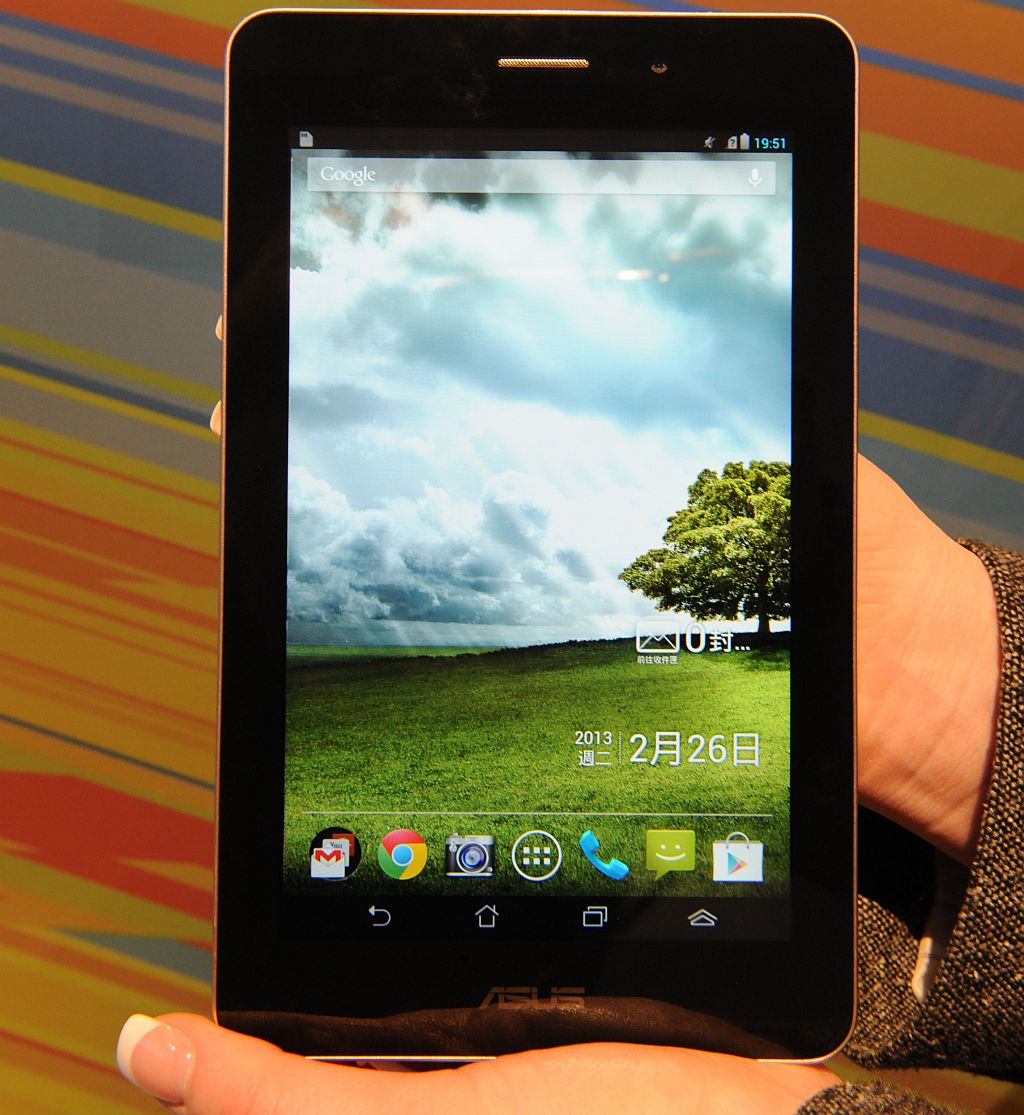
- Manufacturer: Asus
- Type: Phablet
- Released: April 24, 2013
- Discontinued: No
- Operating system: Android 4.1.2 "Jelly Bean"
- System on a chip: Intel Atom Z2420 1.2 or 1.6 GHz dual-core
- Memory: 1 GB RAM 800MHz LPDDR2
- Storage: 8, 16 or 32 GB
- Removable storage: MicroSD Slot
- Display: 7-inch (180 mm) diagonal IPS LCD capacitive touchscreen with 16:10 widescreen aspect ratio 1280×800 WXGA pixels (216 ppi), 10 multitouch points, 178° viewing angle Scratch-resistant Corning Fit Glass
- Graphics: PowerVR SGX544; PowerVR SGX544MP2; Intel GMA; PowerVR G6430
- Sound: MP3, WAV, eAAC+, WMA
- Input: Accelerometer, gyroscope, proximity sensor, GPS/GLONASS, magnetometer, microphone
- Camera: vga MP front-facing 2.0 MP rear (optional)
- Connectivity: 3.5 mm headphone jack, Bluetooth 3.0, Wi-Fi (802.11 b/g/n @ 2.4 GHz), NFC, Micro USB 2.0, docking pins HSPA+
- Power: Internal rechargeable non-removable lithium-ion polymer 4,270 mAh 16 Wh battery
- Online services: Google Play
- Dimensions: 196.4 mm × 120.1 mm × 10.4 mm (7.73 in × 4.73 in × 0.41 in)
- Weight: 340 g (12 oz)
- Related: Nexus 7
- Website: www.asus.com/Phone/ASUS_Fonepad/

Asus Fonepad is a series of 6", 7" and 8" tablet computers with mobile cellular telephony capability (and is therefore considered a "phablet") developed by ASUS. The first model, the Fonepad ME371MG, was launched on April 24, 2013, in India, and April 26 in the UK. Six months later, in September 2013, the Asus Fonepad 7 2014 Edition was launched, followed by the Fonepad 8, and an upgraded 7, in June 2014. On August 26, 2014, Asus launched the Asus Fonepad 7 2014 edition (FE7530CXG), which is a 3G phone calling tablet with an Intel Atom Z3560 processor, 1GB RAM, a 7-inch 1280x800 screen, and Android 4.1.2 Jelly Bean.

In 2014 Asus appointed PT Dragon Computer & Communication and PT Metrodata Electronics to distribute Asus Fonepad devices in Indonesia.
