= Tolapai =

Intel embedded system on a chip

Tolapai is the code name of Intel's embedded system on a chip (SoC) which combines a Pentium M (Dothan) processor core, DDR2 memory controllers and input/output (I/O) controllers, and a QuickAssist integrated accelerator unit for security functions.

== Overview ==
The Tolapai embedded processor has 148 million transistors on a 90 nm process technology, 1088-ball FCBGA with a 1.092mm pitch, and comes in a 37.5mm × 37.5mm package. It is also Intel's first integrated x86 processor, chipset and memory controller since 1994's 80386EX.

Intel EP80579 integrated processor for embedded computing:

- CPU: Pentium M clocked from between 600 MHz and 1.2 GHz
- Cache: 256 KB
- Package: 1088-ball flip chip BGA
- Memory: DDR2 from 400- to 800 MHz; MCH supports DIMM or memory down with optional 32-/64-bit and ECC configurations
- Bus: One local expansion bus for general control or expanded peripheral connections
- PCI Express: PCIe root complex interface in 1 ×8, 2 ×4, or 2 ×1 configurations
- Storage: 2× SATA (Gen1 or Gen2) interfaces
- Networking: 3× 10/100/1000 Ethernet MACs supporting reduced gigabit media-independent interface (RGMII) or reduced media-independent interface (RMII), and Management Data Input/Output (MDIO)
- USB: 2× Universal Serial Bus (1.1 or 2.0) interfaces
- GPIO: 36× General Purpose Input/Output ports
- CAN: 2× Controller Area Network (CAN bus) 2.0b interfaces
- High Speed Serial (HSS): 3× ports for T1/E1 or FXS/FXO connections
- Serial: 1× Synchronous Serial Port (SSP)
- Universal asynchronous receiver-transmitters (UARTs): 2× 16550 UART-compatible
- SMB: 2× System Management Bus (SMBus) interfaces
- LPC: 1× Low Pin Count (LPC 1.1) interface
- SPI: 1× Serial Peripheral Interface Bus (SPI) boot interface
- RTC: Integrated real-time clock (RTC) support
- EDMA: Enhanced DMA (EDMA) engine with low latency memory transfers; supports multiple peer-to-peer configurations
- Operating temperature: 0 to 70 degrees C (most models); −40 to 85 degrees C (some models)

== List of Intel 80579 processors ==
- All models support: MMX, Streaming SIMD Extensions (SSE), SSE2, SSE3, XD bit (an NX bit implementation)
- Die size: 225 mm²
- Steppings: B1

Model	Clock rate	L2 cache	FSB	Mult.	Voltage	TDP	Socket	Release date	Release price (USD)
EP80579 Integrated Processor, 600 MHz	600 MHz	256 KB	400 MT/s	6×	1 V	11 W	FCBGA1088	Q3 2008	$40–51
EP80579 Integrated Processor, 1066 MHz	1.07 GHz	256 KB	533 MT/s	8×	1.3 V	18 W	FCBGA1088	Q3 2008	$42
EP80579 Integrated Processor, 1200 MHz	1.2 GHz	256 KB	533 MT/s	9×	1.3 V	19 W	FCBGA1088	Q3 2008	$70
EP80579 Integrated Processor with QuickAssist, 600 MHz	600 MHz	256 KB	400 MT/s	6×	1 V	13 W	FCBGA1088	Q3 2008	$44
EP80579 Integrated Processor with QuickAssist, 1066 MHz	1.07 GHz	256 KB	533 MT/s	8×	1.3 V	20 W	FCBGA1088	Q3 2008	$66–102
EP80579 Integrated Processor with QuickAssist, 1200 MHz	1.2 GHz	256 KB	533 MT/s	9×	1.3 V	21 W	FCBGA1088	Q3 2008	$102

== See also ==
- Atom (system on chip)
- Intel Quark
