= Lenovo IdeaPhone K900 =

Smartphone

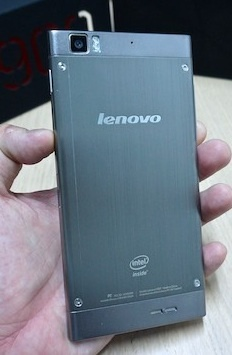
The K900's back case

The Lenovo IdeaPhone K900 is a high-end smartphone with a large screen. The K900 was unveiled at the 2013 International CES in Las Vegas.

== Design and features ==
The Lenovo K900. has a 1080p 5.5-inch screen using IPS technology. The K900's screen has more than 400 pixels per inch and is made with Corning's Gorilla Glass 2. The K900 is 6.9 mm thick and weighs 162 grams. The K900 case is made with a composite of stainless steel and polycarbonate formed in a unibody mold. The K900 runs on the Intel Atom Z2580 processor, a dual core chip, which runs up to 2.0 GHz and utilizes Intel's hyper-threading technology to improve performance. The device also uses an Intel graphics engine running a PowerVR SGX 544MP2 GPU.

The K900's camera is one of its distinctive features. It takes pictures with a resolution of 13 megapixels and has a large aperture f1.8 lens. The K900's lens allows it to take clear photos in low-light conditions without using a flash. The K900 was the first smartphone to use an f1.8 lens. The front-camera has a wide 88-degree viewing angle in order to facilitate self-photos and video chat.

The K900 was designed specifically with emerging markets in Asia in mind. As of May 2013, Lenovo sells the K900 in China, India, Indonesia, Russia, the Philippines, and Vietnam. Lenovo plans to sell the K900 in ten additional markets by the end of the same year. Lenovo has hired professional basketball player Kobe Bryant to help promote the device in China and southeast Asia.

== Reviews ==
In a review, the editors of CNET wrote, "Lenovo is using its own UI, dubbed Le Phone, on the K900 on top of the Android 4.1.2 (Jelly Bean) OS. We like the flourishes to Android, especially the special shortcut buttons that open up five buttons for easy access to settings such as your music, alarm, and brightness. We also opened up the app drawer and found that switching from page to page brings up a cool swirling effect (though that's really quite cosmetic, to be honest). We do, however, have some doubts about the UI..."

In a review for Gizmodo, Mario Aguilar wrote, "The Full HD, 400ppi screen is amazingly satisfying. As you can see in the images, the IPS display blends beautifully with the black bezel. On the reverse, the back panel is totally without bumps, which is impressive on such a slim construction. Not even the camera pokes out."

A review published by the Times of India said, "Our experience with K900 was very good. In terms of hardware, it ticks all the right boxes. The phones feels fast and handles everyday workload very well. For example, multitasking is lag-free and switching between apps happen effortlessly. Even demanding games like Rayman Jungle Run can be played without any issues. Web browsing with multiple tabs is fast and pinch-to-zoom is smooth. GPS works well, call quality, though not exceptional in the league of Galaxy S4 or Nexus 4, is clear and network connection is maintained well." The same review criticized the K900's user interface. The review said, "Our only issue with K900 is the user interface (UI) used in it. K900 is powered by Android Jelly Bean. But Lenovo has stripped out the default options and loaded its customized UI on the phone. While it doesn't seem to affect the performance of the phone, Lenovo's UI neither looks great nor feels intuitive. Though, to be fair to Lenovo, the UI choices and tastes are often subjective. There are some people who love stock user interface in Android while some hate it.

== Updates ==
Lenovo has recently provided a software update which upgrades Android to version 4.3 and changes the Lotus UI to Vibe UI. Users can use the software updater on their PC or flash the Vibe ROM manually.
