= ThinkPad Tablet =

Tablet computer made by Lenovo

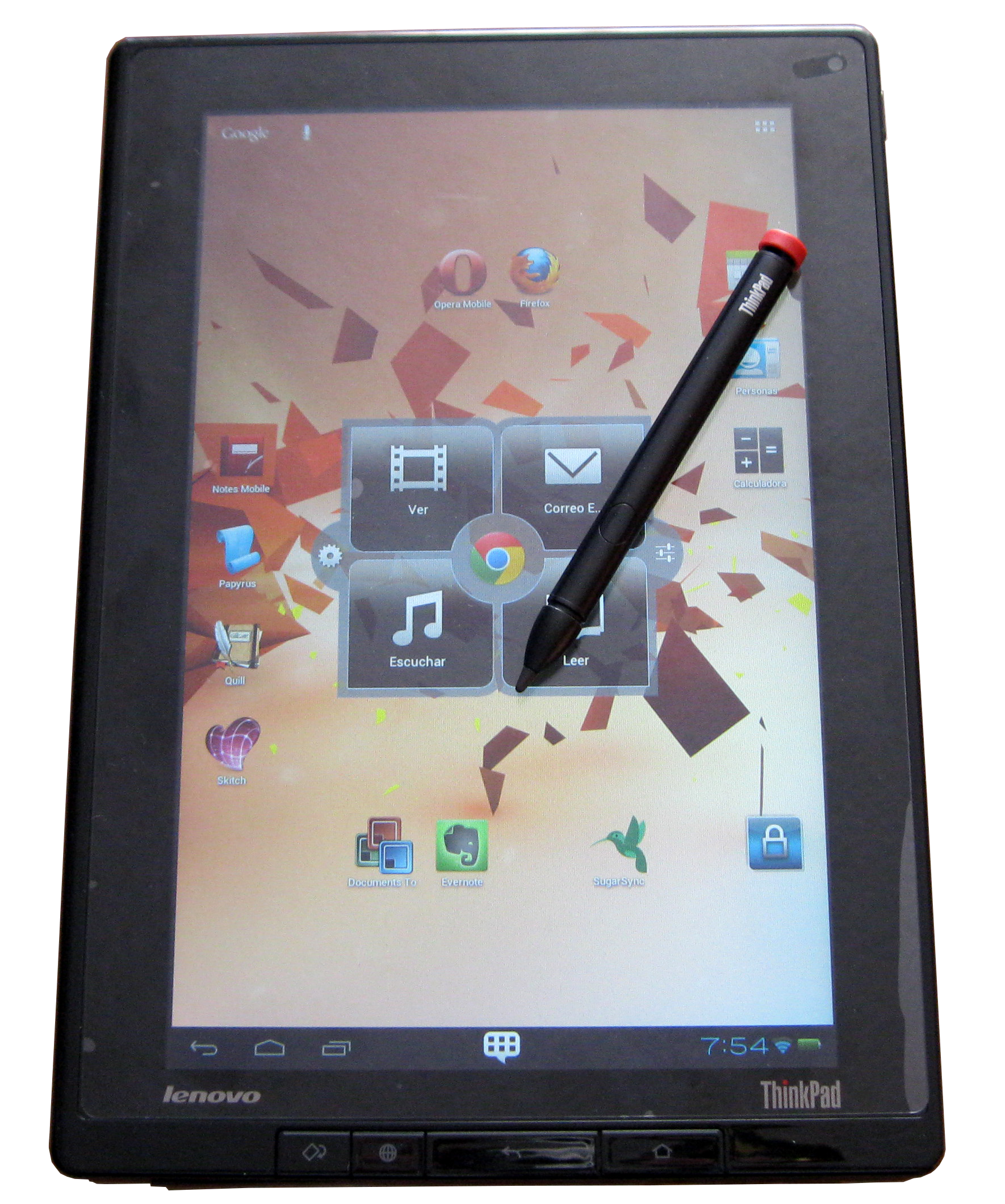
- Lenovo ThinkPad Tablet with Pen
- Developer: Lenovo
- Website: lenovo.com

The ThinkPad Tablet is a tablet computer made by Lenovo as part of its series of Android-based tablet devices and is targeted towards business users. Lenovo's tablet offerings are available in both ThinkPad and IdeaPad variants. While the ThinkPad Tablets are designed for business, the IdeaPad tablets, like the laptops of the same name, are meant for home and personal use. These tablets are different from Lenovo's X Series tablets, which are laptop/tablet hybrids and which use Microsoft Windows as their operating system.

== Description ==
Released in August 2011, the ThinkPad Tablet is the first in Lenovo's line of business-oriented Tablets with the ThinkPad brand. The tablet has been described by Gadget Mix as a premium business tablet. Since the Tablet is primarily business-oriented, it includes features for security, such as anti-theft software, the ability to remotely disable the tablet, SD card encryption, layered data encryption, and Cisco Virtual Private Network (VPN).

Additionally, the ThinkPad Tablet is able to run software such as IBM's Lotus Notes Traveler. The stylus could be used to write notes on the Tablet, which also included software to convert this handwritten content to text. Another feature on the Tablet was a drag-and-drop utility designed to take advantage of the Tablet's touch capabilities. This feature could be used to transfer data between USB devices, internal storage, or an SD card.

Slashgear summarized the ThinkPad Tablet by saying, "The stylus and the styling add up to a distinctive slate that doesn’t merely attempt to ape Apple’s iPad."

The ThinkPad Tablet was discontinued upon the launch of the Windows 8-based ThinkPad Tablet 2 in October 2012. At the same time, Lenovo discontinued the use of Android on its ThinkPad-branded tablets; subsequent models, beginning with the Tablet 2, have exclusively used Windows as their operating system.

== Design and development ==
David Hill, lead designer at Lenovo for ThinkPad said he believed the ThinkPad Tablet to be "the weapon of choice for business success". In his article on the development of the Tablet, he indicated that every design detail was subjected to multiple design reviews, including basic elements such as the placement of the logo.

=== Digitizer pen ===
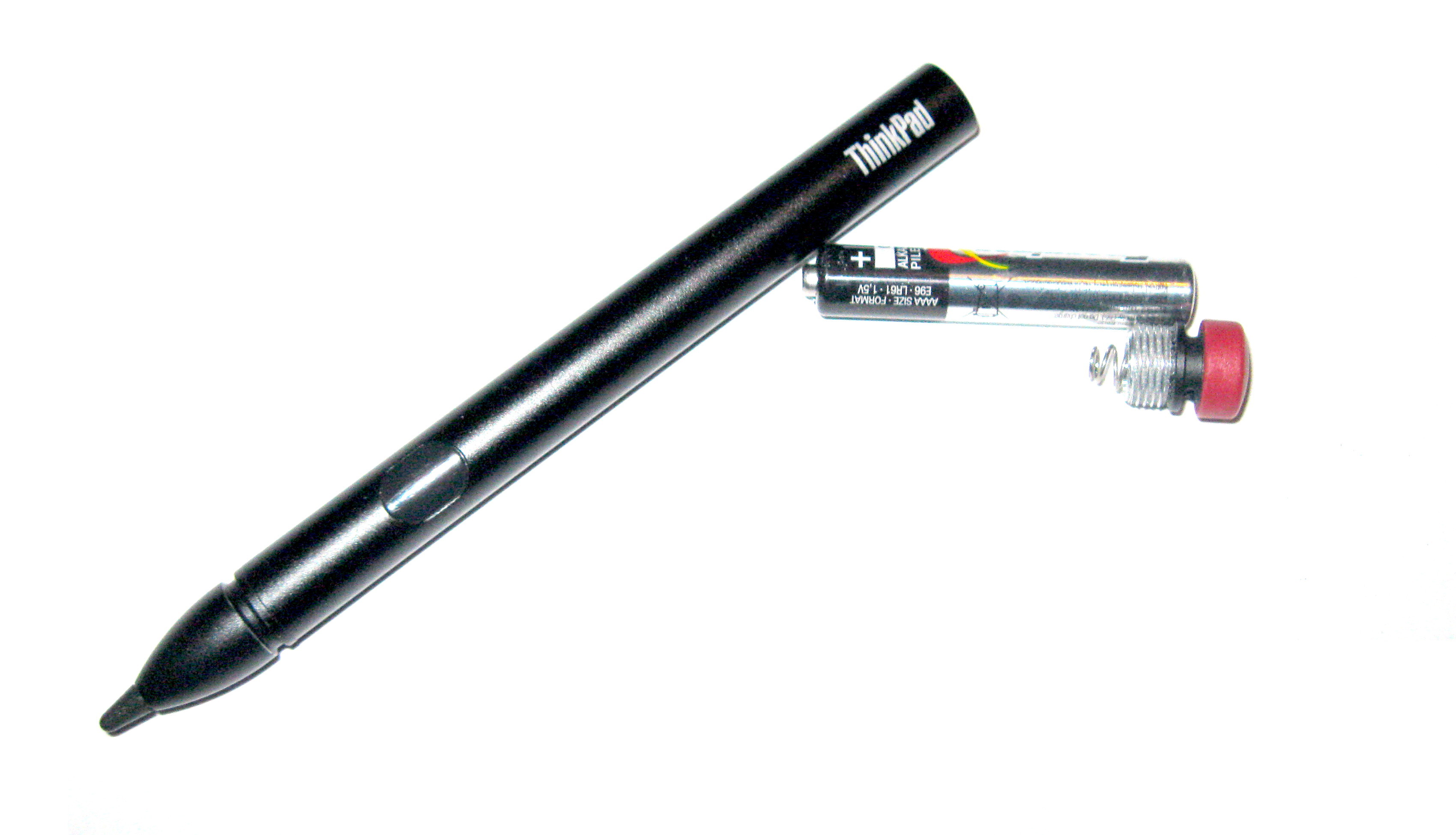
Lenovo ThinkPad 1 Pen

A challenge was indicated to be designing and integrating a digitizer pen into the Tablet, which already had a "crowded interior". This required a study of pen barrel diameter and the balancing of batteries, digitizer technology components, ergonomics, and storage space constraints for the pen itself. Additionally, dowel rods were used for diameter studies and sharpened pencils were used to study the appropriate length with users. The final pen developed based on this was 120 mm long.

=== Folio keyboard ===
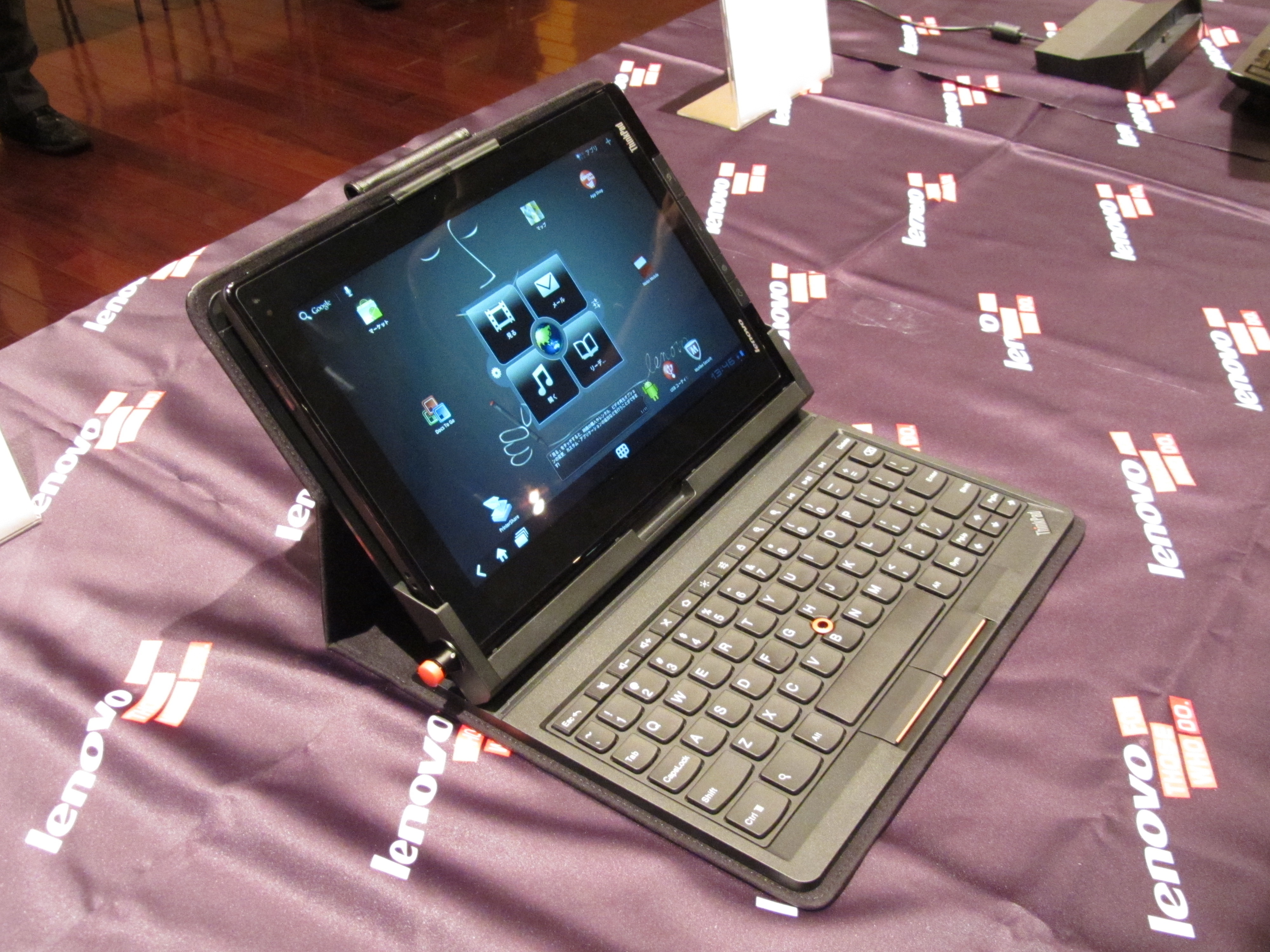
ThinkPad Tablet with keyboard

The ThinkPad Tablet was launched with an optional, dedicated keyboard folio. The folio offered a Lenovo keyboard and an optical trackpoint. The presence of this folio was appreciated by PC World as well, with the reviewer calling the folio the Tablet's best feature.

The folio was designed to offer users of the ThinkPad Tablet a typing experience similar to that of a ThinkPad laptop, as well as cursor control. The full-size keyboard on the folio reputedly offered users the same typing experience as that of the ThinkPad X1. Using a standard strain gauge based TrackPoint would have increased the folio thickness, making it necessary for innovation in the implementation of cursor control. Optical sensor technology was chosen for this, providing capabilities for traditional TrackPoint placement as well as the familiarity of a Touchpad.

=== ThinkPad Tablet Dock ===
The ThinkPad tablet dock is useful to charge the tablet. It only supports the tablet in vertical mode.

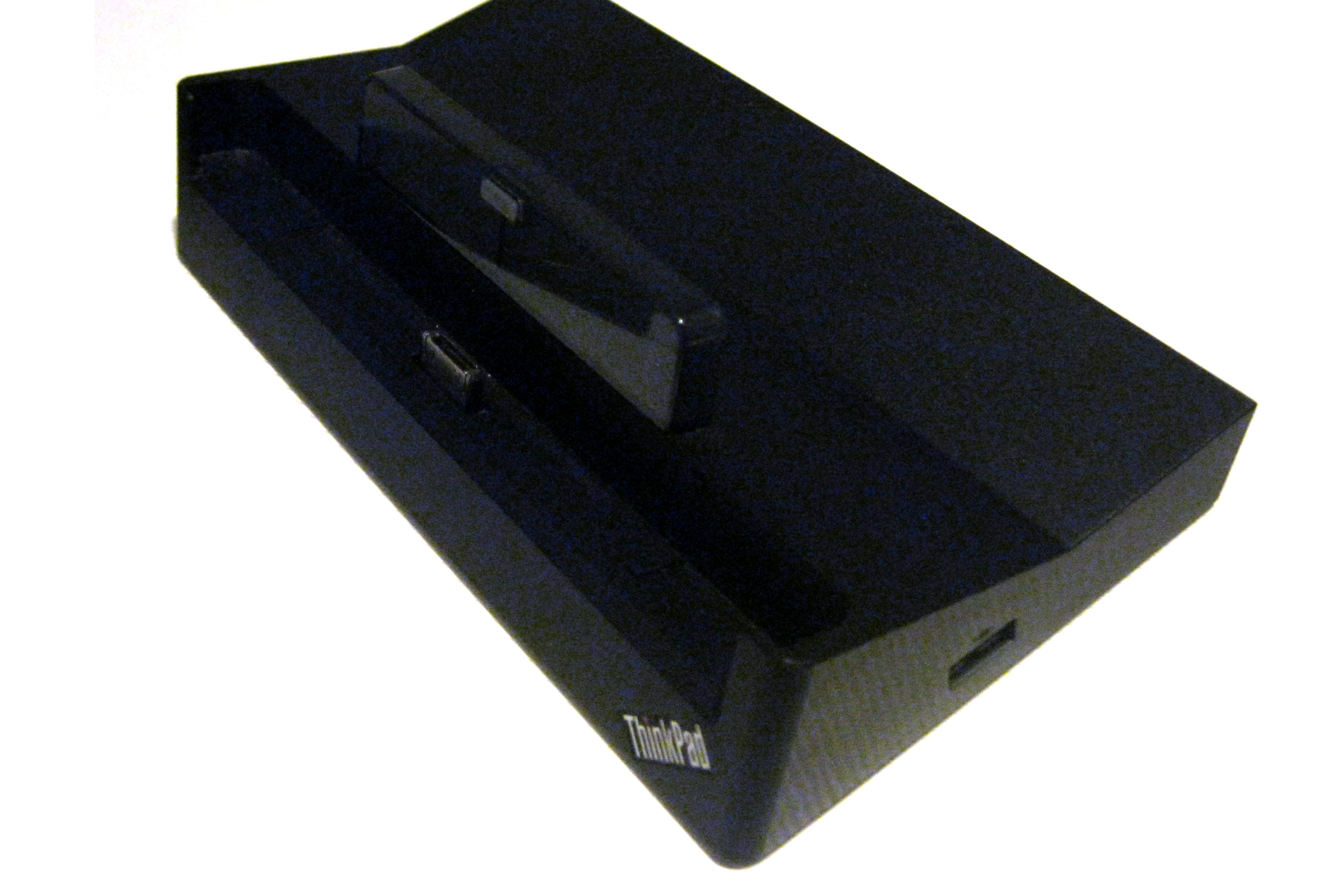
IBM ThinkPad Tablet dock

On the back side there in audio output port, microphone input port, a micro USB port and support for the Thinkpad 20V power adapter. On its side it has a full size USB port.

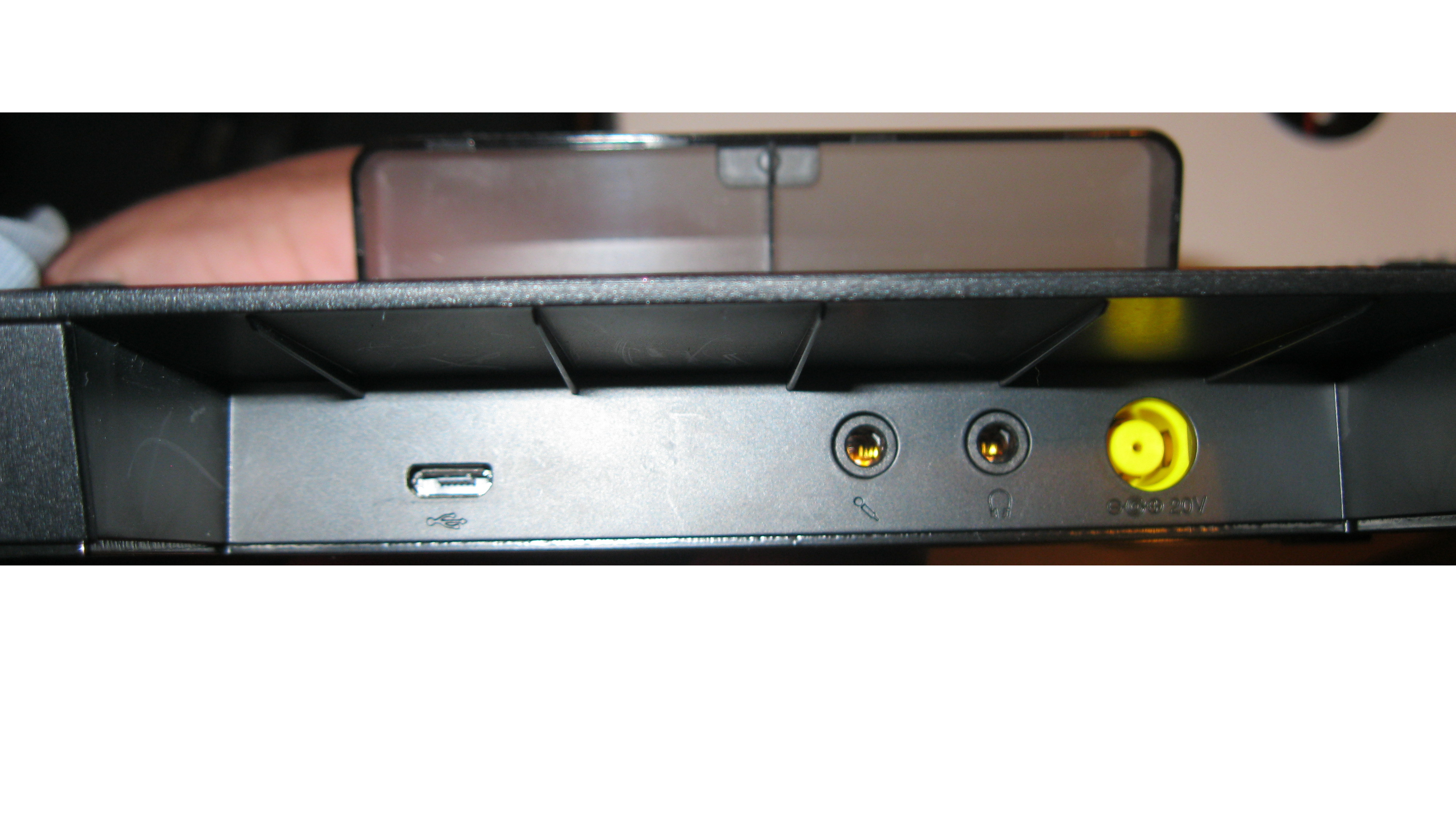
IBM ThinkPad Tablet dock

== Security ==
According to Lenovo, eight major security vulnerabilities typical for tablet devices have been addressed in the ThinkPad Tablet. These are:

- Encryption: The ThinkPad Tablet's internal storage device and removable SD card are encrypted via functionality built into the Android OS used on the tablet.
- Anti-malware: The ThinkPad Tablet offers McAfee anti-malware preloaded, with options to upgrade to a corporate managed anti-malware solution.
- Data Leakage: Features on the Tablet allow the USB ports, SD card slot, camera and microphone to be disabled and controlled by an IT administrator. The Tablet is certified by Good Technology, which encrypts email as well and prevents email data from being copied from the Tablet.
- User authentication: In addition to Android's support for a user-defined PIN password, the ThinkPad Tablet also includes the capacity to lock the Tablet using Active Directory credentials.
- Application control: Lenovo offers preloaded images on the ThinkPad Tablet, allowing users to customize the applications on the Tablet. Additionally, IT departments can create customized App Shops to restrict the applications that can be downloaded and installed to the Tablet. The Tablet also included Citrix receiver, which allows businesses to host and run applications on their own servers.
- Anti-theft and recovery: The ThinkPad Tablet includes Absolute Computrace with Persistence, allowing Tablet data to be remotely wiped in case of loss or theft.
- Rooted device detection: The ThinkPad Tablet automatically detects if it has been rooted, sending a report to a company's IT department. This allows an IT department to determine if the Tablet should be retrieved from the user or if access to resources should be restricted.

== Business-grade features ==
According to Matt Kohut, the ThinkPad Tablet is the industry's first business-class Tablet because Lenovo is "the only vendor who can provide a full suite of services to make our customers more productive and secure." He substantiated this by discussing the warranty on the ThinkPad Tablet, ThinkPad Protection, custom 'images' and asset tags.

The warranty on the ThinkPad Tablet was a standard one year which could be upgraded to three years. This was indicated as being different from other Tablet warranties, which were anywhere between 90 days and a maximum of two years. ThinkPad Protection was described as being a method to protect the Tablet against common accidents. Again, Matt Kohut claimed that accidental damage protection was not on offer by many leading Tablet vendors, even at additional cost.

The custom image allowed businesses to deploy Tablets that adhere to company security policies and with company applications preloaded. Finally, custom asset tags were also available and designed to attach to the bottom of the Tablet.

== Specifications ==
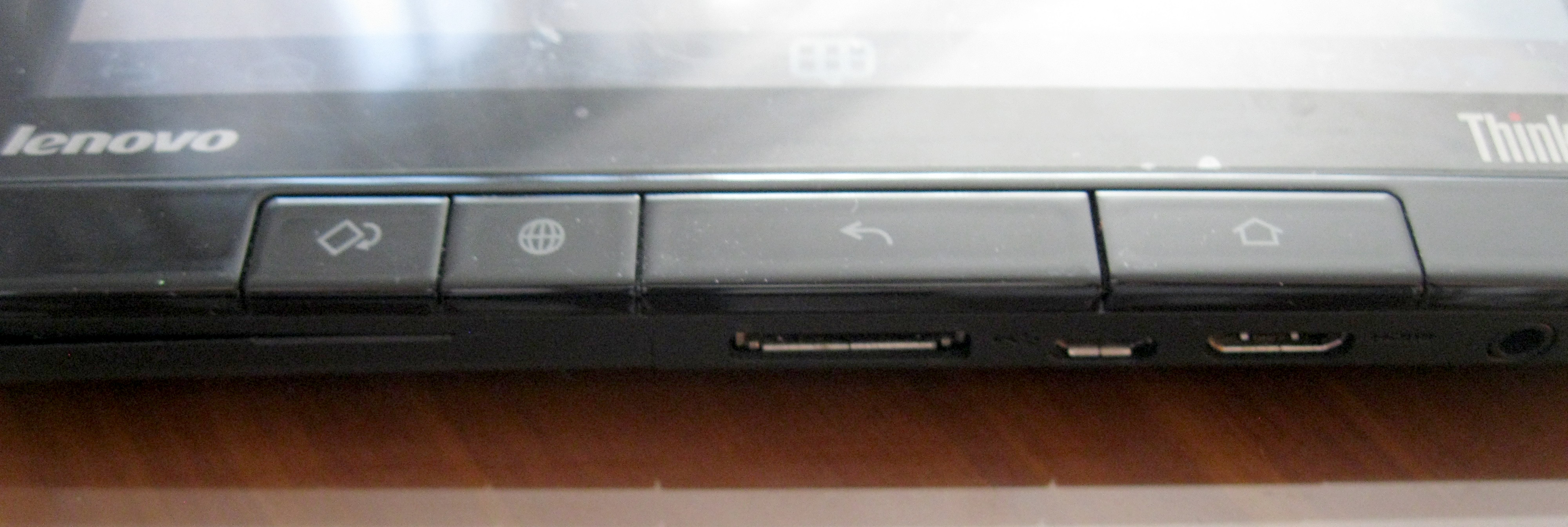
Buttons and ports on a Lenovo Thinkpad Tablet

The ThinkPad Tablet offered the following specifications:

- Processor: NVIDIA Tegra 2 Dual-Core 1 GHz processor
- Operating system: Android 3.1 (Upgradable to 4.0)
- Display: 10.1 inch, 1280x800, 16:10, IPS, multitouch display screen
- Weight: starting at 1.65 lb (0.75 kg)
- Battery life: up to 8 hours
- Storage: up to 64GB storage
- Connectivity: Bluetooth, Wi-Fi and 3G
- Ports: USB 2.0, micro-USB, mini-HDMI
- Speakers and Connectors: SD card reader, Mini-HDMI out, SIM card slot (on selected models), mic, headphone
- Card reader: 3 in 1
- Camera: 2 megapixel (front), 5 megapixel (rear)
- Additional features: accelerometer, gyroscope, ambient light sensor

== Reviews ==
In its review, PC World listed the pros of the ThinkPad Tablet as the full size USB port and SD card slot, the optional keyboard portfolio carry case, and the digitizer pen. The cons were listed as the thickness (14mm) and the bland design.

The Tablet was described as serving "both work and play with key security and manageability features". The Corning Gorilla glass display uses IPS (in-plane switching) technology and offers a 178-degree viewing angle.

== Locked bootloader ==
Some models of this tablet came with a locked bootloader. This means if the Android software and Recovery Menu fails, the tablet will brick with a software error without a way to recovering it. The only solution Lenovo offers is to replace the motherboard of the tablet. Lenovo has explained that this happens because the tablet contains DRM protected software and Lenovo proprietary code on the Android image.

== Hardware issues ==
Users on different forums have reported that the following hardware components on this tablet are prone to failure:

- The on/off switch.
- The micro-USB port.

ThinkPad Tablet; 2011	Succeeded by ThinkPad Tablet 2
