= Lenovo IdeaTab Lynx =

Tablet computer released in late 2012

The Lenovo IdeaTab Lynx is an 11.6" Atom-based Windows 8 tablet computer with keyboard dock released in late 2012.

== Launch ==
The IdeaTab Lynx was released in the United States in December 2012. The Lynx tablet sold for $599 and its Accutype keyboard base was priced at $149.

== Features ==
=== Design ===
The Lynx is an 11.6-inch tablet. The Lynx without the dock is 11.85 × 7.4 × 0.37 inches and weighs 1.41 lb (0.64 kg). The keyboard dock weighs 1.45 lb (0.66 kg) for a total 2.86 lb (1.30 kg).

=== Specifications and performance ===
The Lynx runs the full version of Windows 8 as opposed to Windows RT. The Lynx uses a 1.8 GHz dual-core Clovertrail Intel Atom Z2760 processor, 2 GB of memory, and either 32 GB or 64 GB of eMMC flash storage. The 11.6-inch in-plane switching display has a resolution of 1366 × 768 resolution and supports five-point capacitive multitouch. Micro-USB and micro-HDMI ports and a microSD card slot are on Lynx table. The keyboard dock has two standard USB 2.0 ports. The Lynx also has Bluetooth 4.0, 802.11b/g/n Wi-Fi networking, stereo speakers, dual microphones, a 2-megapixel front-facing webcam.

== Reviews ==
In its review of the Lynx, CNET wrote: "The real question is, how will the Lynx stand out? One answer might be its weight. Despite its 11.6-inch screen, the tablet felt shockingly light when we held it at Lenovo's launch event. Although Lenovo says it's 1.44 pounds, the Lynx's tablet portion is closer in feel to a Kindle than an iPad, but with a larger display than either. The keyboard dock takes away from the Lynx's airiness, of course, although the two at least feel solidly linked when you use them together. The latch is so secure that you don't have to worry about accidentally dislodging the screen. We were also happy with the responsiveness of the Lynx's touchscreen, although we didn't get a chance to challenge it during our five minute hands-on."

In a review for Financial Express Nandagopal Rajan wrote, "The best part of the Lynx has to be the 1366x768p display IPS display, which despite not being Full HD still is very clear and bright. The overall performance is good, as long as you don’t really push your luck. After all, this is powered by an Intel Atom Z2760 processor, which is just not made for heavy duty stuff. Try opening a high resolution picture and you will see what I am talking about. But then this is a great device for content consumption thanks to the screen and multimode utility."
