= Lenovo A10 tablet =

Type of Android tablet computer

The Lenovo A10 tablet is an Android tablet computer. It launched in 2014 at a price of $250 in the United States.

== Specifications and performance ==
The A10 has a 10.1-inch IPS display with a resolution of 1280 by 800. Its CPU is a 1.3 gigahertz MediaTek 8121 quad-core processor. It has 1 gigabyte of RAM. The A10 offers a relatively long battery life with a capacity of 6,340 mAh. It includes a 5 megapixel rear camera and a 2 megapixel front camera. The A10 has two front-facing speakers with Dolby audio enhancements. It has a microSD card slot which allows for storage expansion. Wi-Fi 802.11b/g/n are supported, as is Bluetooth 4.0. It weighs 1.2 pounds. The A10's shell is dark blue and has a smooth, matte finish with rounded corners.

The A10 has what Lenovo calls a "Smart Side Bar", which gives access to recent apps and shortcuts for display controls. It can be found by either changing the screen orientation when set to be automatic, or swiping from the bezel to the center of the screen when set to be manual. Lenovo packages the A10 with an app from Dolby Audio to manage sound settings. The A10 ships with Android 4.4.2 with an upgrade to version 4.4.3 available for download.

== Reviews ==
A review for CNET stated, "The Lenovo A10's design, screen, and performance may not be high-end, but when you close your eyes and listen to its speakers, it definitely sounds high-end. The 10-inch tablet is one of the few with speakers that won't make you cringe in horror when they're at full blast."

In a review for Greenbot, Blake Stimac wrote, "The Lenovo A10 isn't without competition, and some may find competing tablets like the Samsung Galaxy Tab 3 10.1 superior. Still, I'd go as far to say that the A10 has the best speakers on any tablet in its price range, and that's not something to ignore. Personally, if I were in the market for a 10-inch budget tablet, I'd be torn between Lenovo's tablet and Samsung's. If you're looking for a decent tablet at a decent price, the Lenovo A10 should at very least be on your consideration list, despite the troubling display resolution."
