= Intel Quark =

Line of CPUs designed for small size and low power consumption

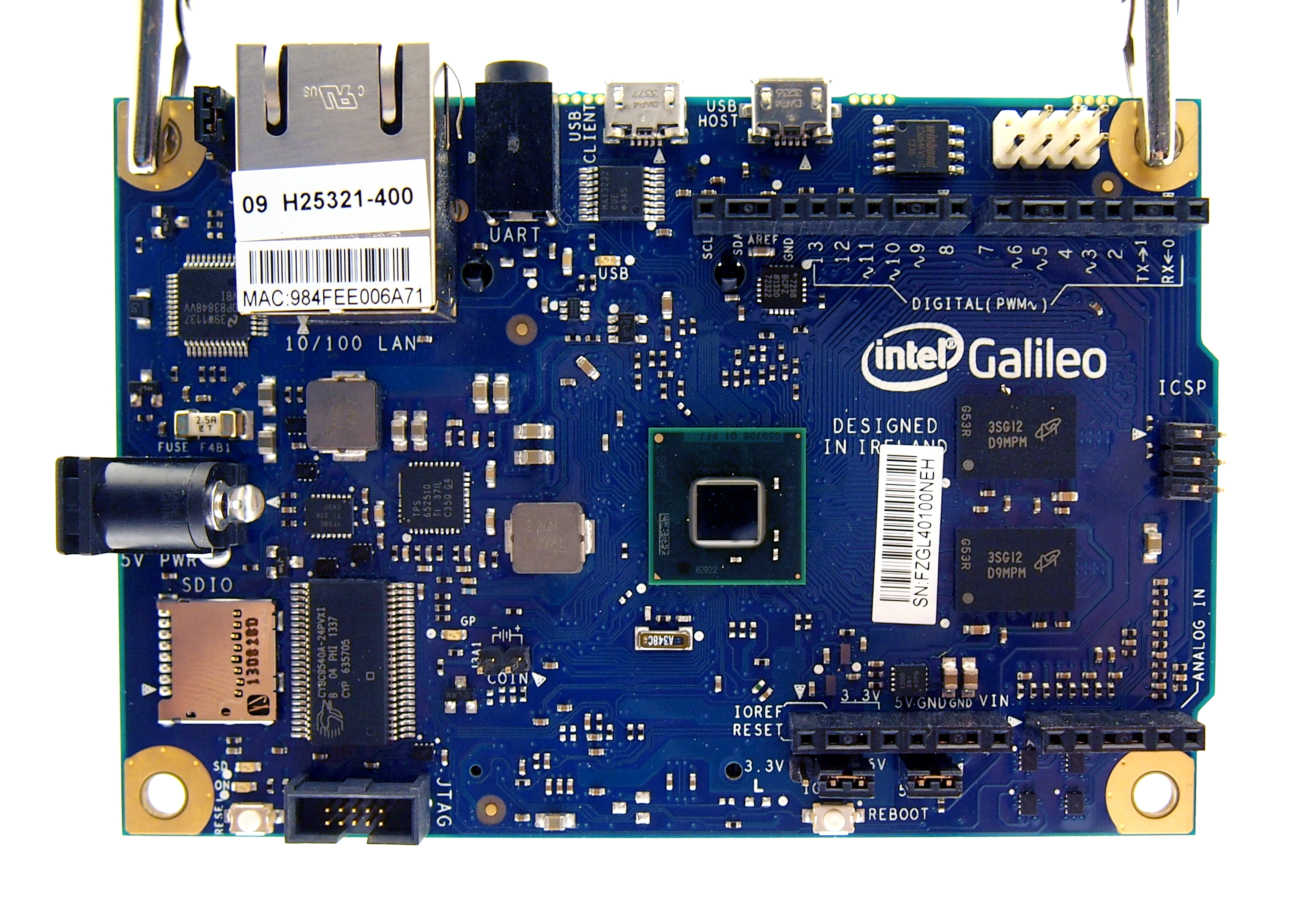
Intel Galileo board with Quark processor

Intel Quark is a line of 32-bit x86 SoCs and microcontrollers by Intel, designed for small size and low power consumption, and targeted at new markets including wearable devices. The line was introduced at Intel Developer Forum in 2013, and discontinued in January 2019.

Quark processors, while slower than Atom processors, are much smaller and consume less power. They lack support for SIMD instruction sets (such as MMX and SSE) and is intended to support embedded operating systems.

Quark powers the (now discontinued) Intel Galileo developer microcontroller board. In 2016 Arduino released the Arduino 101 board that includes an Intel Quark SoC. The CPU instruction set is, for most models, the same as a Pentium (P54C/i586) CPU.

== History ==
The first product in the Quark line is the single-core 32 nm X1000 SoC with a clock rate of up to 400 MHz. The system includes several interfaces, including PCI Express, serial UART, I²C, Fast Ethernet, USB 2.0, SDIO, power management controller, and GPIO. There are 512 kB of on-chip embedded SRAM and an integrated DDR3 memory controller.

A second Intel product that includes Quark core, the Intel Edison microcomputer, was presented in January 2014. It has a form factor close to the size of an SD card, and is capable of wireless networking using Wi-Fi or Bluetooth.

In January 2015, Intel announced the sub-miniature Intel Curie module for wearable applications, based on a Quark SE core with 80 kB SRAM and 384 kB flash. At the size of a button, it also features a 6-axis accelerometer, a DSP sensor hub, a Bluetooth LE unit and a battery charge controller.

Intel announced the end-of-life of its Quark products in January 2019, with orders accepted until July 2019 and final shipments set for July 2022.

== List of processors ==
=== "Lakemont" (32 nm) ===
The name Lakemont has been used in reference to the processor core in multiple Quark-series processors.

==== "Clanton" ====
- All models support i586 instruction set, with x87 FPU and NX bit
- Temperature range: -40 °C to +85 °C for X10x1 models, 0 °C to +70 °C, for X10x0 models
- Secure boot supported on X102x models
- DDR3 controller with one 16-bit channel
- Two PCI-Express 2.0 controllers, with 1 lane each.
- USB Controller with two USB 2.0 Host ports and one USB 2.0 device port
- Two 10/100 MBit Ethernet controllers
- Integrated memory card reader supporting SDIO 3.0, eMMC 4.41 and SD 3.0
- Serial I/O supporting SPI, UART (serial port) and I2C

(The L2 cache column shows the size of the L1 cache.)

Model	sSpec number	Cores	Clock rate	GPU frequency	L2 cache	I/O bus	Memory	Voltage	TDP	Socket	Release date	Part number(s)	Release price (USD)
Quark X1000	SR1BY (A0)	1	400 MHz	—N/a	16 KB	PCIe	DDR3-800	0.95–1.1 V	2.2 W	FC-BGA11E	Q4'13	DH8066101538300	$9.63
Quark X1001	SR1VB (A0)	1	400 MHz	—N/a	16 KB	PCIe	DDR3-800	0.95–1.1 V	2.2 W	FC-BGA11E	Q2'14	DHQ1ET	$11.77
Quark X1010	SR1BZ (A0)	1	400 MHz	—N/a	16 KB	PCIe	DDR3-800 (ECC)	0.95–1.1 V	2.2 W	FC-BGA11E	Q1'14	DH8066101555100	$10.16
Quark X1011	SR1VC (A0)	1	400 MHz	—N/a	16 KB	PCIe	DDR3-800 (ECC)	0.95–1.1 V	2.2 W	FC-BGA11E	Q2'14	DHQ1ECCET	$12.31
Quark X1020	SR1VW (A0)	1	400 MHz	—N/a	16 KB	PCIe	DDR3-800 (ECC)	0.95–1.1 V	2.2 W	FC-BGA11E	Q2'14	DHQ1ECCSECCTS1	$11.45
Quark X1020D	SR1BX (A0)	1	400 MHz	—N/a	16 KB	PCIe	DDR3-800 (ECC)	0.95–1.1 V	2.2 W	FC-BGA11E	Q1'14	DH8066101531900	$10.70
Quark X1021	SR1WH (A0)	1	400 MHz	—N/a	16 KB	PCIe	DDR3-800 (ECC)	0.95–1.1 V	2.2 W	FC-BGA11E	Q2'14	DHQ1ECCSECETS1	$13.39
Quark X1021D	SR1VA (A0)	1	400 MHz	—N/a	16 KB	PCIe	DDR3-800 (ECC)	0.95–1.1 V	2.2 W	FC-BGA11E	Q2'14	DHQ1ECCSECET	$12.85

==== "Silver Butte" ====
- Implements only a limited subset of the 32-bit x86 instruction set (e.g. segmentation, BCD/string instructions, AF/PF flags, XCHG are not supported)

Model	sSpec number	Cores	Clock rate	GPU frequency	L2 cache	I/O bus	Memory	Voltage	TDP	Socket	Release date	Part number(s)	Release price (USD)
Quark D1000	SLKMJ (B1)	1	32 MHz	—N/a		AHB-Lite, APB	eSRAM	1.62–3.63 V	0.025 W	QFN40	Q3'15	DMNIAD01SLVBT	$2.54

==== "Mint Valley" ====
- Supports i586 instruction set, without x87.

Model	sSpec number	Cores	Clock rate	GPU frequency	L2 cache	I/O bus	Memory	Voltage	TDP	Socket	Release date	Part number(s)	Release price (USD)
Quark D2000	SR2KF (A0)	1	32 MHz	—N/a		AHB-Lite,APB	eSRAM	1.62–3.63 V	0.025 W	QFN40	Q3'15	FND2000	$2.54

==== "Atlas Peak" ====
- Supports i586 instruction set, without x87.

Model	sSpec number	Cores	Clock rate	GPU frequency	L2 cache	I/O bus	Memory	Voltage	TDP	Socket	Release date	Part number(s)	Release price (USD)
Quark SE C1000	SR2T6 (A0); SR2TJ (A1)	1	32 MHz	—N/a	8 KB	AHB-Lite, APB	eSRAM	1.8–3.3 V	0.025 W	VFBGA144	Q4'15	LMCQ1000	$10.32
Quark SE C1000	SR29D (A0); SR2VT (A1)	1	32 MHz	—N/a	8 KB	AHB-Lite, APB	eSRAM	1.8–3.3 V	0.025 W	WL-CSP144	Q4'15	EQCQ1000	$10.32

== Segfault bug ==
Intel Quark SoC X1000 contains a bug (#71538) that "under specific circumstances" results in a type of crash known as a segfault. The workaround implemented by Intel is to omit LOCK prefixes (not required on single-threaded processors) in the compiled code. While source-based embedded systems like those built using the Yocto Project can incorporate this workaround at compile time, general purpose Linux distributions such as Debian are deeply affected by the bug. Such a workaround is not easy to implement in binaries meant to support multithreading too as they require LOCK prefixes to function properly.

== See also ==
- Intel Management Engine
