= Sony Tablet S =

2011 tablet computer by Sony

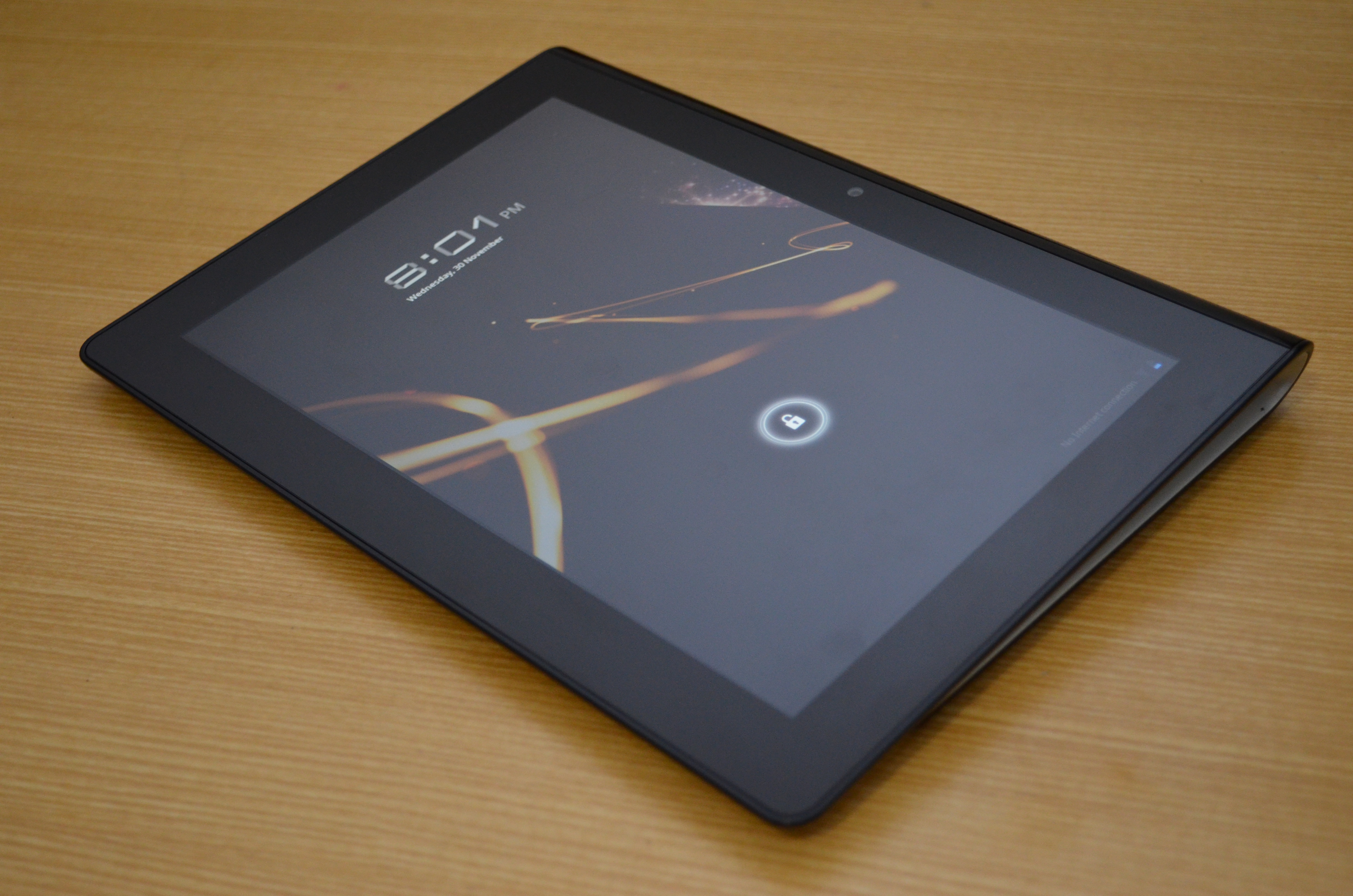
- Codename: nbx03
- Also known as: SGPT11 series
- Developer: Sony Corporation
- Manufacturer: Foxconn
- Product family: Sony Tablet
- Type: Tablet computer
- Released: 16 September 2011 (US & Europe), 17 September 2011 (Japan), 25 October 2011 (Australia)
- Lifespan: 1-2 years
- Introductory price: US$399
- Discontinued: August 2012
- Operating system: Android 3.1 "Honeycomb"; Upgradable to Android 4.0.4 "Ice Cream Sandwich"
- CPU: Nvidia Tegra 2, 1 GHz dual core
- Memory: 1 GB
- Storage: 16/32 GB flash memory
- Display: 9.4 in (240 mm) 1280×800 pixel (16:10) TruBlack TFT LCD (161 PPI)
- Graphics: ULP GeForce
- Sound: 2 Stereo Speakers
- Input: Capacitive multi-touch touchscreen
- Camera: Front: 0.3 MP; Rear: 5.11 MP Exmor for mobile
- Connectivity: Bluetooth v2.1 + EDR, DLNA, infrared, Wi-Fi 802.11b/g/n
- Online services: Google Play, Sony Entertainment Network, Reader Store, PlayStation Suite
- Dimensions: 241.2 mm (9.50 in) H 174.3 mm (6.86 in) W 10.1 mm (0.40 in) D (thickest point: 20.6 mm)
- Weight: Wi-Fi model: 598 g (21.1 oz)
- Successor: Xperia Tablet S
- Related: Sony Tablet P
- Website: sony.com/tablet

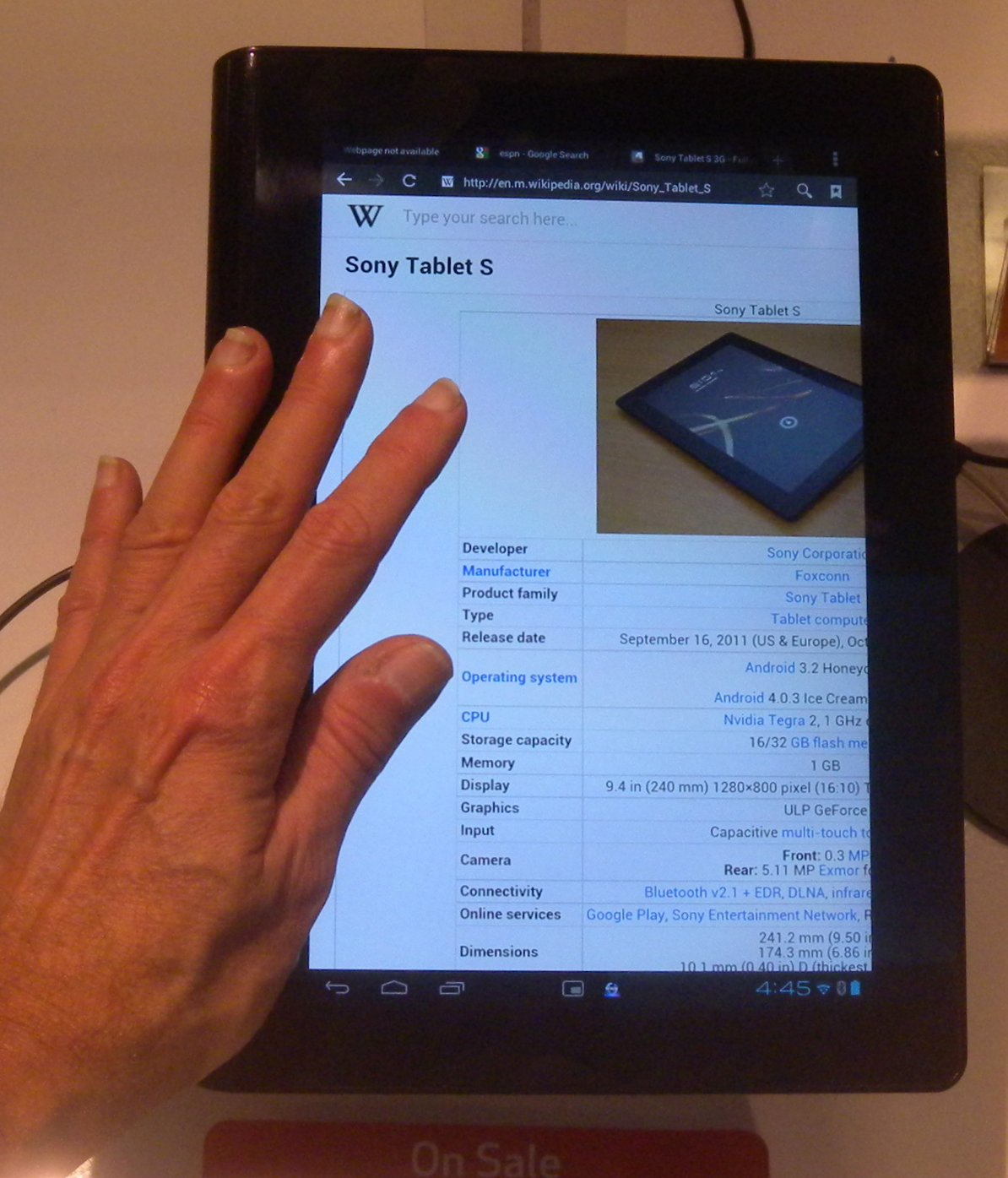
Displaying its own Wikipedia page

Illustration

The Tablet S is a tablet computer released by Sony in September 2011. Featuring a "unique asymmetric design", the Tablet S runs Google's Android 3.1 Honeycomb operating system and features a 9.4 in (240 mm) multitouch display, 1 GHz Nvidia Tegra 2 dual core processor, Wi-Fi ability, front- and rear-facing cameras, Bluetooth, and an infrared sensor. It is also configured with access to the Sony Entertainment Network and is PlayStation Certified and DLNA compatible. Tablet S was Sony's first modern tablet computer. It was succeeded by the Xperia Tablet S, which would be created by Sony's new subsidiary Sony Mobile.

== Design ==
The main distinguishing feature of the Tablet S is its "unique asymmetric design" in which the thickness of the device tapers from 20.6 to 10.1 mm (0.81 to 0.40 in). This "wrap" effect is intended to evoke an "open paperback stuffed into the back pocket, or a magazine folded backward upon itself such that only a single page is visible to read," and reduces the amount of torque while being held. Sony claims that this "off-center of gravity design realizes stability and ease of grip as well as a sense of stability and lightness, offering comfortable use for hours."

== Hardware ==
The Tablet S features a 9.4 inches (240 millimetres), 1280×800 pixel resolution, TFT LCD using Sony's proprietary TruBlack Display—the same technology as that used in the company's Bravia range of televisions.

It uses the Nvidia Tegra T20 system on a chip (SoC), which consists of a 1 GHz ARM Cortex-A9 dual core processor and a ULP GeForce graphics processing unit (GPU), with 1 GB RAM and either 16 or 32 GB internal storage and support for SD memory cards up to 32 GB.

Other onboard features include an accelerometer, 3-axis gyroscope, magnetometer (digital compass), GPS receiver, 802.11b/g/n Wi-Fi, Bluetooth v2.1 + EDR, infrared, Micro USB, microphone, 3.5 mm headphone jack and 0.3 MP front-facing and 5 MP rear-facing cameras.

Like other Android devices, the Tablet S has no hardware navigation buttons, which are all implemented via persistent on-screen buttons. The only physical buttons present on the device are the power button and volume rocker located in the recessed area on one side.

The tablet uses a proprietary power connector.

== Software ==
The Tablet S1 was initially launched with Android 3.1 Honeycomb, but a 3.2 update was made available soon after its release. Also, it received an upgrade to Android 4.0.3 at the end of April (in Japan and the US). It uses a customized version of the operating system. Features and applications unique to the Sony device include:

- A customizable row of most frequently used icons on the top-left of the screen
- A "Favourites" bar at the top-right
- A customized version of the Android web browser
- A universal remote control app for the built-in IR transmitter
- Apps for accessing Sony Entertainment Network (Music Unlimited and Video Unlimited)
- An app for Sony Reader eBooks
- Social Feed Reader—an application that aggregates Facebook and Twitter social media status updates
- Crash Bandicoot and Pinball Heroes PlayStation Store games

Although Sony Tablet S is a PlayStation Certified device, an update to the PlayStation Store disabled all such devices from being able to purchase PS one classics. Instead, only original content will be available for purchase by Tablet S owners.

In September 2012, Sony Tablet S received a major update to Android 4.0.3 Release 5a, which brought the following notable changes:

- Added Guest mode (before Google announced multiple-user accounts would be supported on Android 4.2 tablets)
- Added Small Apps, support for widgets, and support for Support Development Kit
- Added macro functionality to Remote Control App and skin change
- Added input languages for Japanese (Hand-writing), Korean, Arabic, Thai, and Greek
- Replaced Social Feed Reader Cloud app with Socialife
- Replaced DLNA, Video Player and Music Player apps with Walkman, Album and Movies.
- Renamed PersonalSpace to PlayMemories Online
- Renamed Select to Sony select
- Removed Favorite app
- Added xLOUD and Clear Phase audio enhancers.

The Sony Tablet S was confirmed for an update to Android 4.1 Jelly Bean, which would have arrived in February 2013. However, the Jelly Bean 4.1 update was unofficially cancelled when Sony posted (and later removed) in their community message board stating "we do not have a roadmap to release the Jelly Bean update for the 1st Generation Tablet (Sony Tablet S)."

== Reception ==
Reviewers have largely been positive towards the Sony Tablet S, praising its unique ("thoroughly renovated") design. The Wall Street Journal said that "the Tablet S will appeal to buyers who would like a distinctive tablet from a trusted company that doesn't look like an iPad wannabe" while PC World said "[Sony] has not lost its design mojo over the years, as this model brings Sony's originality and flair to a tablet market that desperately needs both." Asher Moses from the Sydney Morning Herald called it "best Android tablet yet."

Negative comments are directed at the device's high price and poor build quality. Tech blog Gizmodo called it "plasticky" and pointed out that Sony's use of inferior materials to save on weight led to their unit getting "seriously scratched during a totally routine photo shoot" and commented that it would "smash into a million pieces" if dropped. Time observed that the Tablet S falls short of Sony's aspirations to compete with the iPad, with reviewer Jared Newman quoting Sony CEO Howard Stringer's comments, and saying "if the Tablet S is what Stringer has in mind, I weep for Sony’s future." The ExpertReviews wrote that the absence of video output was an annoying drawback. Some reviewers criticize the tablet for Low-res screen and ageing software.

=== Recognition ===
The Tablet S was an honoree in the Consumer Electronics Association's CES Innovation Design and Engineering Awards 2012, in the "Tablets, E-Readers and Netbooks" category.

== See also ==
- Sony Tablet
- Tablet computer
- Comparison of tablet computers
- Sony Reader, e-reader
- Sony Vaio UX Micro PC, an older line that were sometimes called "tablets"
