= Sony Xperia Tablet Z =

2013 Android tablet by Sony Xperia

Xperia Tablet Z
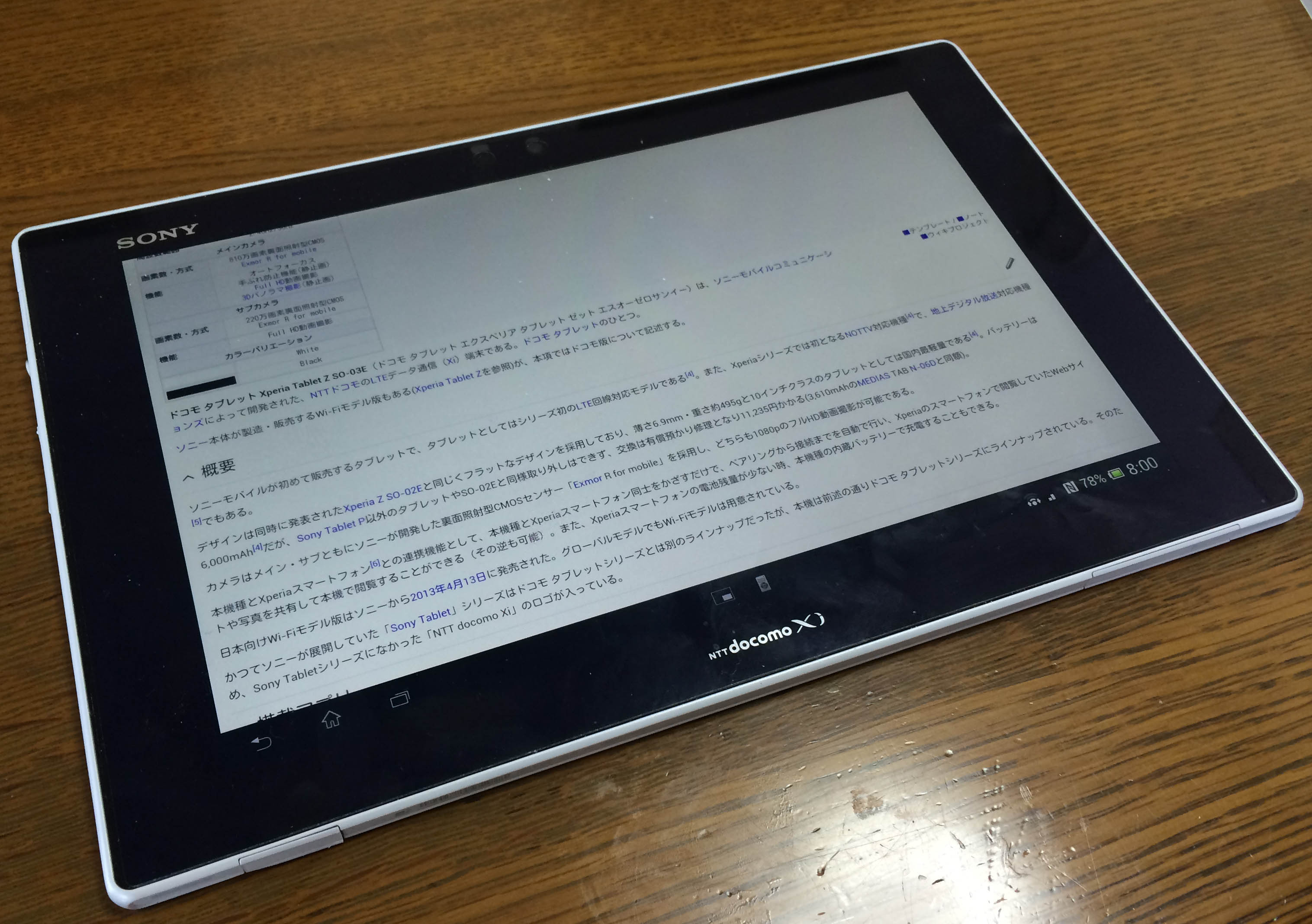
- Japanese Xperia Tablet Z
- Manufacturer: Sony
- Product family: Xperia series
- Type: Tablet computer
- Released: May 2013
- Operating system: Android 4.1.2 "Jelly Bean" (Upgradeable to Android 5.1.1 "Lollipop")
- CPU: 1.5GHz Qualcomm Snapdragon S4 Pro APQ8064 quad-core processor
- Memory: 2 GB
- Storage: 16/32 GB (option for microSD up to 64 GB)
- Display: 10 inch screen with full HD, 1,920x1,200 resolution, 224ppi
- Sound: Internal speakers
- Input: Multi-touch touchscreen display
- Camera: Rear: 8.0 MP with Exmor R for mobile imaging engine and a backside illuminated sensor Front: 2.0 megapixels with 720p for video chat
- Connectivity: Wi-Fi 802.11b/g/n 4G LTE
- Dimensions: 266 mm x 6.9 mm x 172 mm
- Weight: 494g (1.09 pounds)
- Predecessor: Sony Xperia Tablet S
- Successor: Sony Xperia Tablet Z2

The Xperia Tablet Z is a touchscreen Android tablet designed and manufactured by Sony and was first announced in Japan in January 2013. It was then announced globally in Barcelona at the Mobile World Congress on February 25, 2013. The tablet is one of the lightest and thinnest 10.1-inch tablet in the world with a weight of 1.09 pounds (495 grams) and is just 0.27 inches (6.9 mm) thick. The Tablet Z succeeds the Xperia Tablet S with a faster processor, a better front-facing camera, a higher-resolution screen, and Ingress Protection Ratings of IP55 and IP57, for dust-protected, water-jet protected, and waterproof in up to one meter of water for up to thirty minutes. It was released in May 2013. The device retails at $500 for the 16 GB (Wi-Fi only) version and $600 for the 32 GB (Wi-Fi only) version.

== Hardware ==
The capacitive touchscreen display measures 10.1 inches with a WUXGA resolution of 1920 × 1200 and a 224 ppi density. It includes Sony's Mobile Bravia Engine 2 technology which is used in Sony's Bravia branded televisions. The tablet features a Qualcomm Snapdragon S4 Pro chipset that comes with quad-core Krait CPU clocked at 1.5 GHz, Adreno 320 GPU, 2 GB of RAM, and 16 or 32 GB of internal storage. The tablet also has an external slot with micro SD card allowing expandable storage up to 64 GB. The rear camera of the tablet has 8 megapixels with Exmor R sensor and with full HD video recording capabilities while the front camera has 2 megapixels and is capable of 720p video recording. The Xperia Tablet Z is NFC (near-field communication) enabled which can be used with Xperia SmartTags, NFC enabled accessories such as speakers or for low value financial transactions, as NFC becomes more widespread in use, with the appropriate applications from Google Play. The tablet also comes with an infrared port and with the help of the TV SideView app the Xperia Tablet Z can be used as a remote control. The tablet is water resistant and can stay in one meter of water for 30 minutes.

== Software ==
The tablet was released with the Sony UI on top of Android 4.1.2 Jelly Bean. It received Android 4.4.2 KitKat in June 2014. Xperia Tablet Z is also PlayStation Certified allowing users access to Sony's PlayStation Suite.

In May 2015, the Sony Xperia Tablet Z received Android 5.0 Lollipop.

== Variants ==
The device was sold in Wi-Fi and 4G/LTE versions. The availability of the 4G/LTE version varied by country.

== Reception ==
The Xperia Tablet Z has received very positive critical reception. The device has been praised for its design, performance, and low weight, while criticized for its somewhat high price. PCMag praised the device, saying that "The Sony Xperia Tablet Z is among the finest Android tablets available, combining an incredibly thin and light design with top-notch performance."

The Xperia Tablet Z won EISA’s European Tablet of the Year (2013-2014) award, said to be "the perfect choice for anyone seeking a combination of unique style and technology".

The Xperia Tablet Z was named the 4th best tablet of 2013 by TechRadar.

== Successor ==
A successor to the Xperia Tablet Z was announced by Sony on February 24, 2014, with the unveiling of the Sony Xperia Z2 Tablet. This tablet was released in March 2014 in the UK and July 2014 in the US.

== See also ==
- Sony Tablet
- Sony Xperia Tablet S
- Sony Xperia Z series
- Comparison of tablet computers

Preceded by Sony Xperia Tablet S	Sony Xperia Tablet Z 2013	Succeeded by Sony Xperia Z2 tablet
