= Pointing stick =

Joystick typically mounted in a keyboard

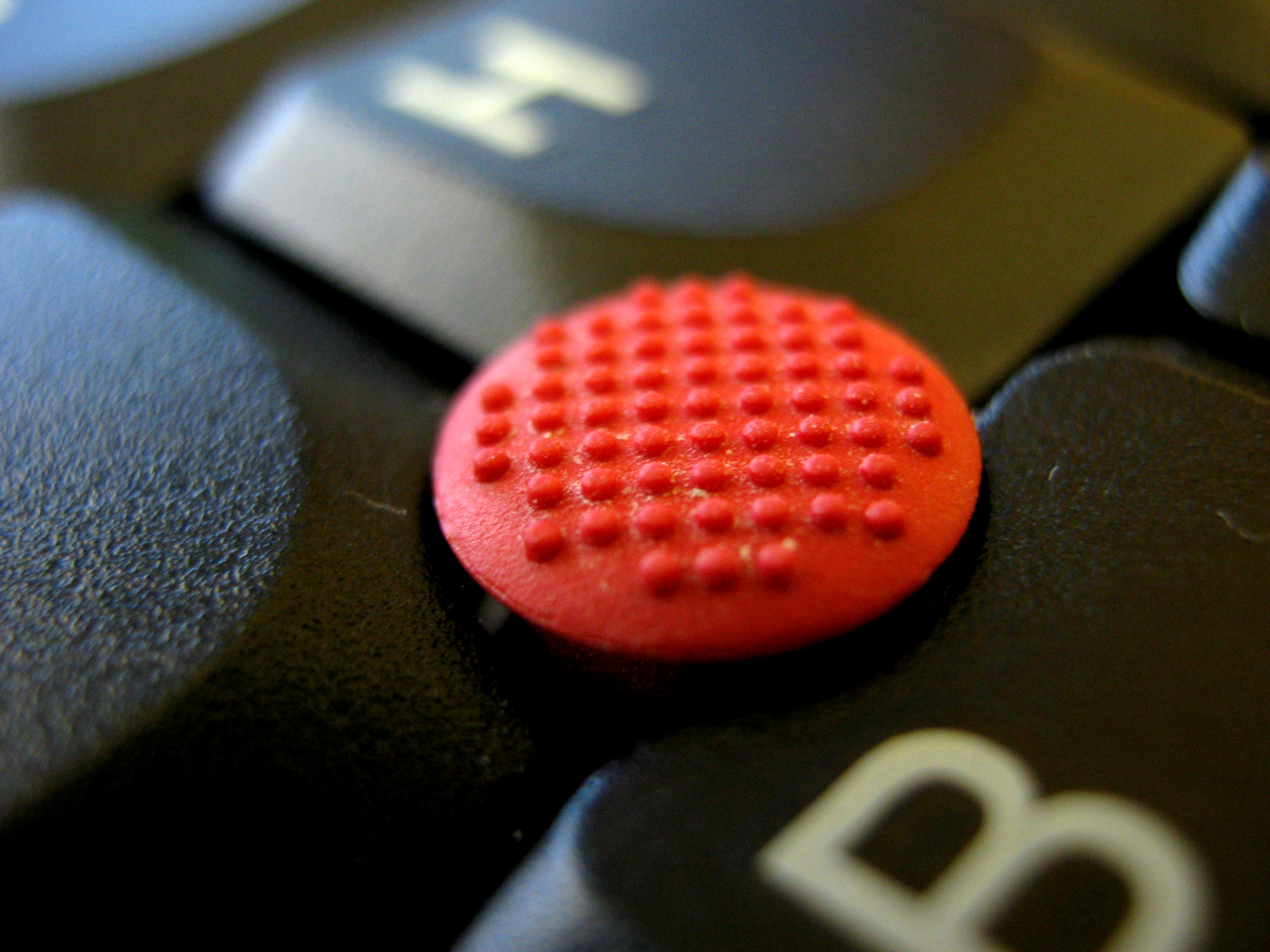
Pointing stick on a Lenovo ThinkPad

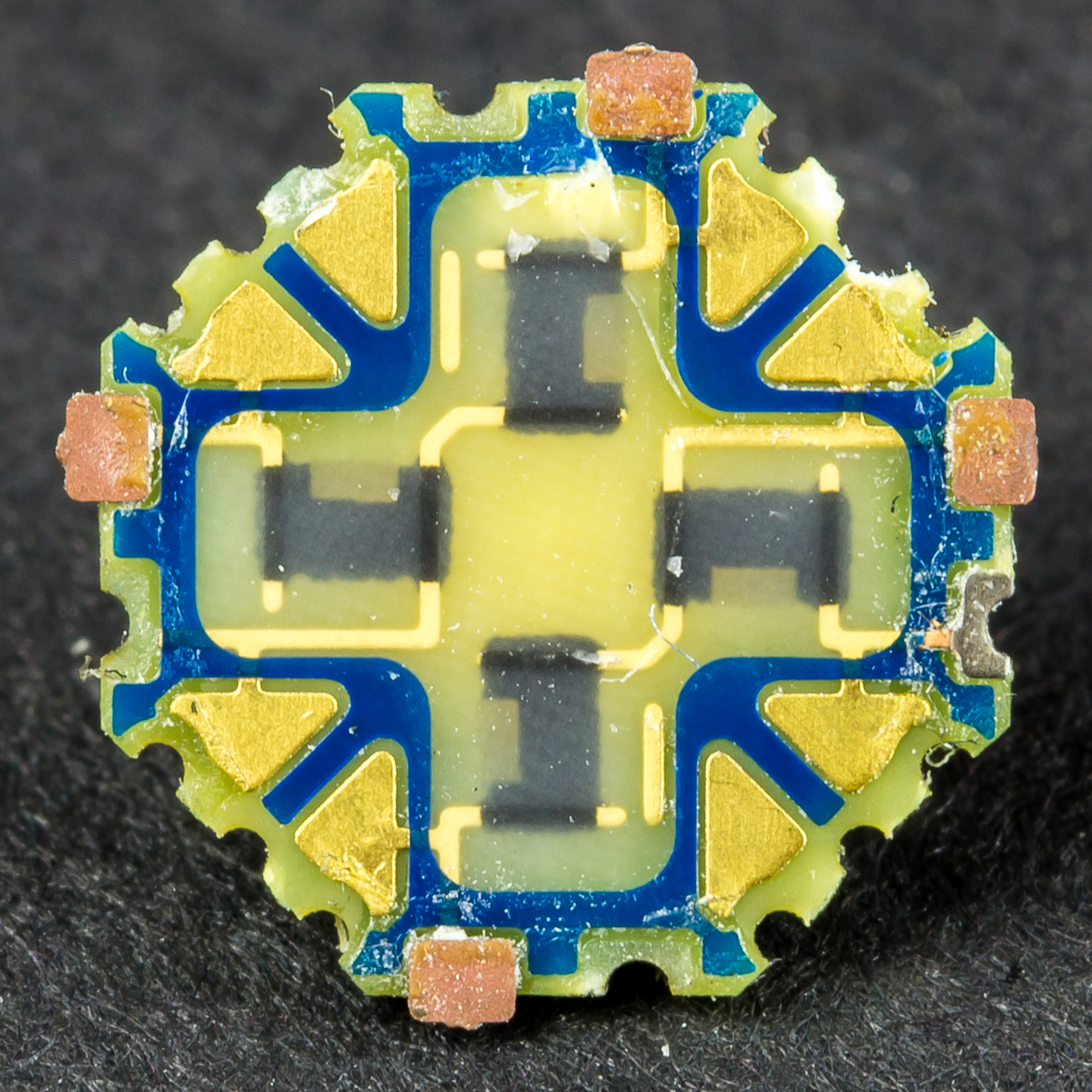
Detail: rear side of a Lenovo ThinkPad pointing stick with the strain gauges. Size: 8 x 8 mm. Out of patent

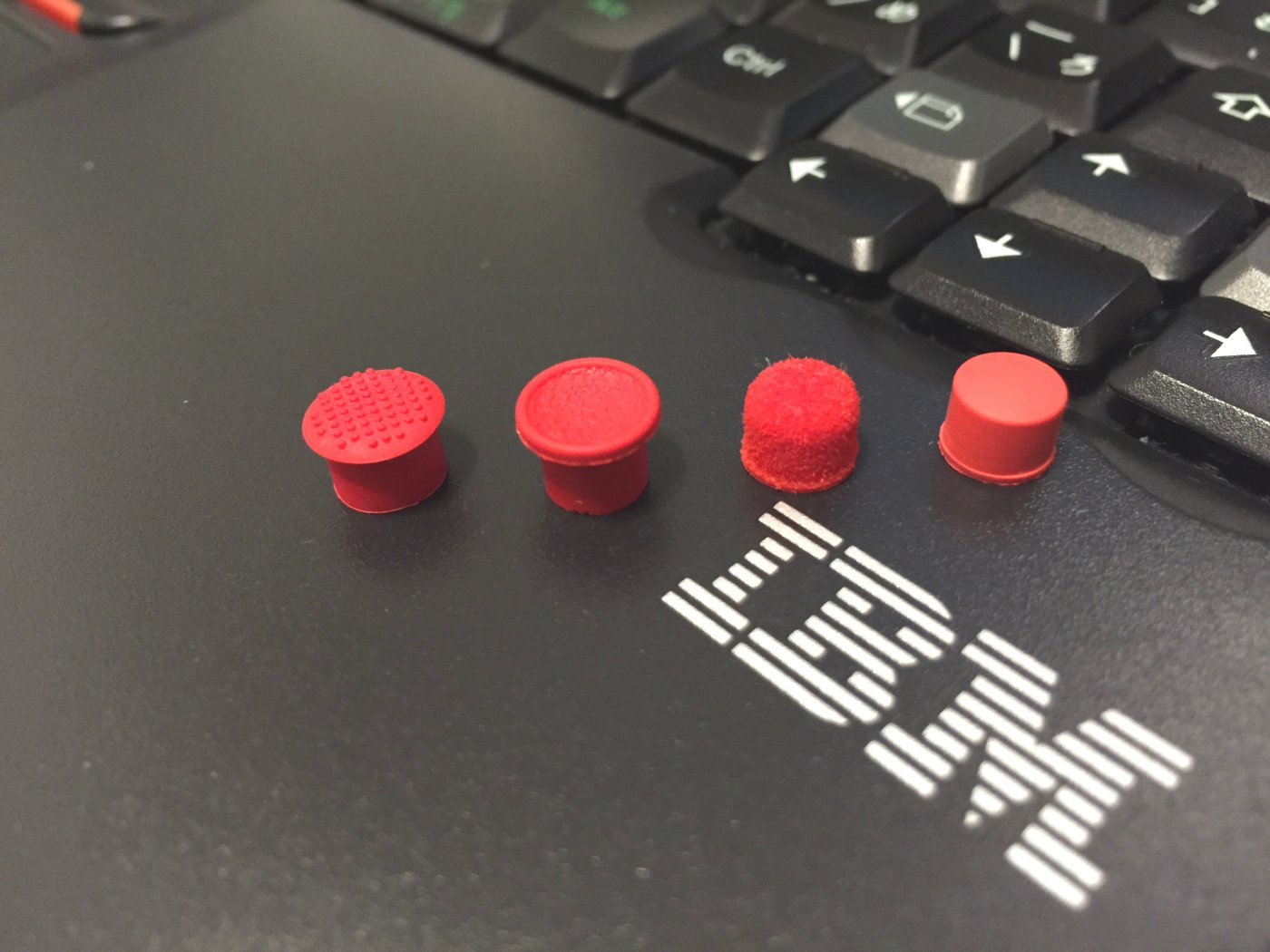
IBM ThinkPad caps (left-to-right): Soft Dome, Soft Rim, Classic Dome, Eraser Head (discontinued)

A pointing stick (or trackpoint, also referred to generically as a nub) is a small analog stick used as a pointing device typically mounted centrally in a computer keyboard. Like other pointing devices such as mice, touchpads or trackballs, operating system software translates manipulation of the device into movements of the pointer on the computer screen. Unlike other pointing devices, it reacts to sustained force or strain rather than to gross movement, so it is called an "isometric" pointing device. IBM introduced it commercially in 1992 on the ThinkPad 700 series under the name "TrackPoint", and patented an improved version of it in 1997 (but the patent expired in 2017). It has been used for business laptops, such as Acer's TravelMate, Dell's Latitude, HP's EliteBook and Lenovo's ThinkPad.

The pointing stick senses applied force by using two pairs of resistive strain gauges. A pointing stick can be used by pushing with the fingers in the general direction the user wants the pointer to move. The velocity of the pointer depends on the applied force so increasing pressure causes faster movement. The relation between pressure and pointer speed can be adjusted, just as mouse speed is adjusted.

On a QWERTY keyboard, the stick is typically embedded among the G, H, and B keys, and the mouse buttons are placed just below the space bar. The mouse buttons can be operated right-handed or left-handed due to their placement below the keyboard along the centerline. This pointing device has also appeared next to screens on compact-sized laptops such as the Toshiba Libretto and Sony VAIO UX.

== Variants ==
Pointing sticks typically have a replaceable rubber cap, called a nub, which can be a slightly rough "eraser head" material or another shape.

The cap is red on ThinkPad laptops, but is also found in other colors on other machines. It may be gray, pink, black or blue on some Dell models, blue on some HP/Compaq laptops, and green or gray on most Toshiba laptops produced before the 2000s.

Button configurations vary depending on vendor and laptop model. ThinkPads have a prominent middle mouse button, but some models have no physical buttons. Toshiba employs concentric arcs.

In the early 1990s, Zenith Data Systems shipped a number of laptop computers equipped with a device called J-Mouse, which essentially used a special keyswitch under the J key to allow the J keycap to be used as a pointing stick.

In addition to appearing between the G, H and B keys on a QWERTY keyboard, these devices or similar can also appear on gaming devices as an alternative to a D-pad or analog stick. On certain Toshiba Libretto mini laptops, the pointing stick was located next to the display. IBM sold a mouse with a pointing stick in the location where a scroll wheel is common now.

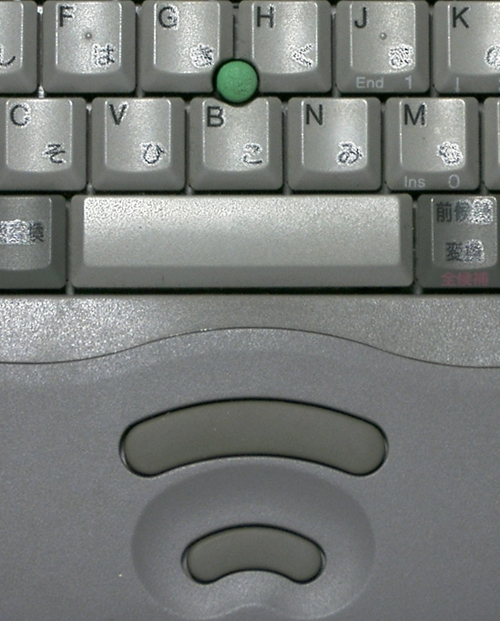
A pointing stick on a mid-1990s-era Toshiba laptop. The two buttons below the keyboard act as a computer mouse: the top button is used for left-clicking while the bottom button is used for right-clicking.

Optical pointing sticks are also used on some Ultrabook tablet hybrids, such as the Sony Duo 11, ThinkPad Tablet and Samsung Ativ Q.

On the Gateway 2000 Liberty laptop the pointing stick is above the enter key on the right side of the keyboard, in place of the \ key.

A pointing stick was featured in the New Nintendo 3DS as a secondary analog stick, known as the C-Stick.

== Design challenges ==
The IBM TrackPoint III and the TrackPoint IV have a feature called Negative Inertia that causes the pointer's velocity to "overreact" when it is accelerated or decelerated. Negative Inertia is intended to avoid the feeling of inertia or sluggishness when starting or stopping movement. Usability tests at IBM have shown that it is easier for users to position the pointer with Negative Inertia, and performance is 7.8% better.

Another challenge with pointing stick design is the identification of the zero position (the position where no motion is desired). Because the amount of motion is small, the sensitivity of the sensors must be high, and they are subject to noise interference.

A typical solution, which assumes that pointing sticks frequently go out of calibration, is to interpret a variation below a certain threshold (over a given interval, perhaps one or several seconds) as being a neutral stick. However, the recalibration can also allow brief periods of 'drifting' (movement of the pointer while the user is not moving the pointing stick).

In practice, if the re-calibration interval is set too short and if the user applies moderately consistent pressure to the stick for such an interval, this method results in an incorrect zero point. Additional pressure again moves the pointer, but the calibration may occur again, requiring even more force. If the user releases pressure at this point, the change will be interpreted as an instruction to move the opposite direction. In time, the software will re-calibrate and stop the motion.

Additionally, if "press-to-select" is enabled, the software may generate unexpected click events by touching the pointing stick during typing.

== History ==
In 1984, Ted Selker, a researcher at PARC, worked on a pointing stick based on a study showing that it takes a typist 0.75 seconds to shift from the keyboard to the mouse, and comparable time to shift back. Selker built a model of a device that would minimize this time. It was only three years later, working at IBM, that Selker refined his design, resulting in the TrackPoint product for which IBM received US patents in 1996 and 2000.

Pointing sticks were the dominant pointing device for laptops before the advent of the touchpad. During later years, they faced a decline in popularity as most laptop-producing brands switched to touchpads, although as of 2021, some manufacturers like Lenovo still produce laptops with pointing sticks.

== Problem scope ==
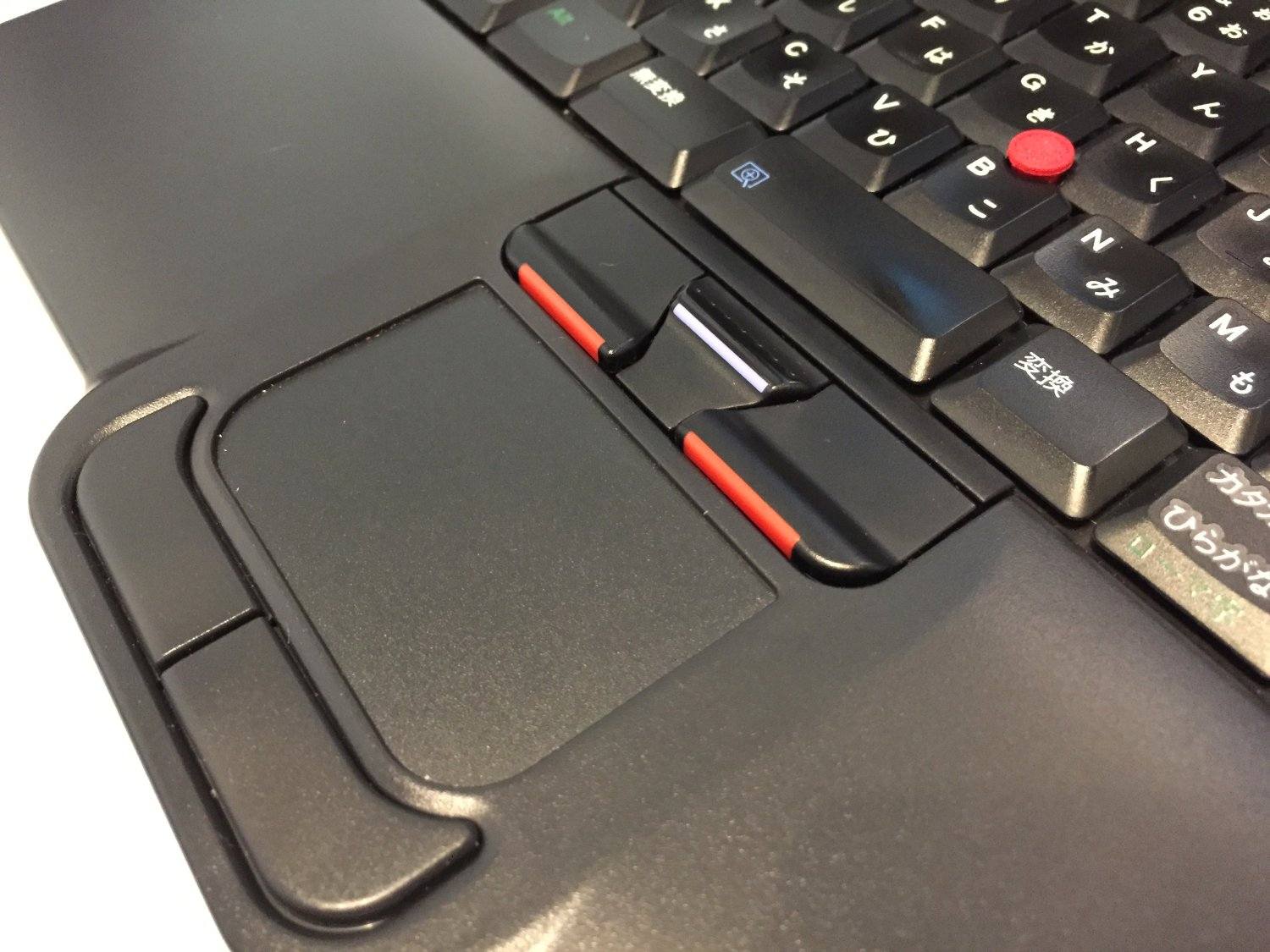
A ThinkPad UltraNav featuring both a red pointing stick (top right) and a touchpad (bottom left)

=== Space constraints ===
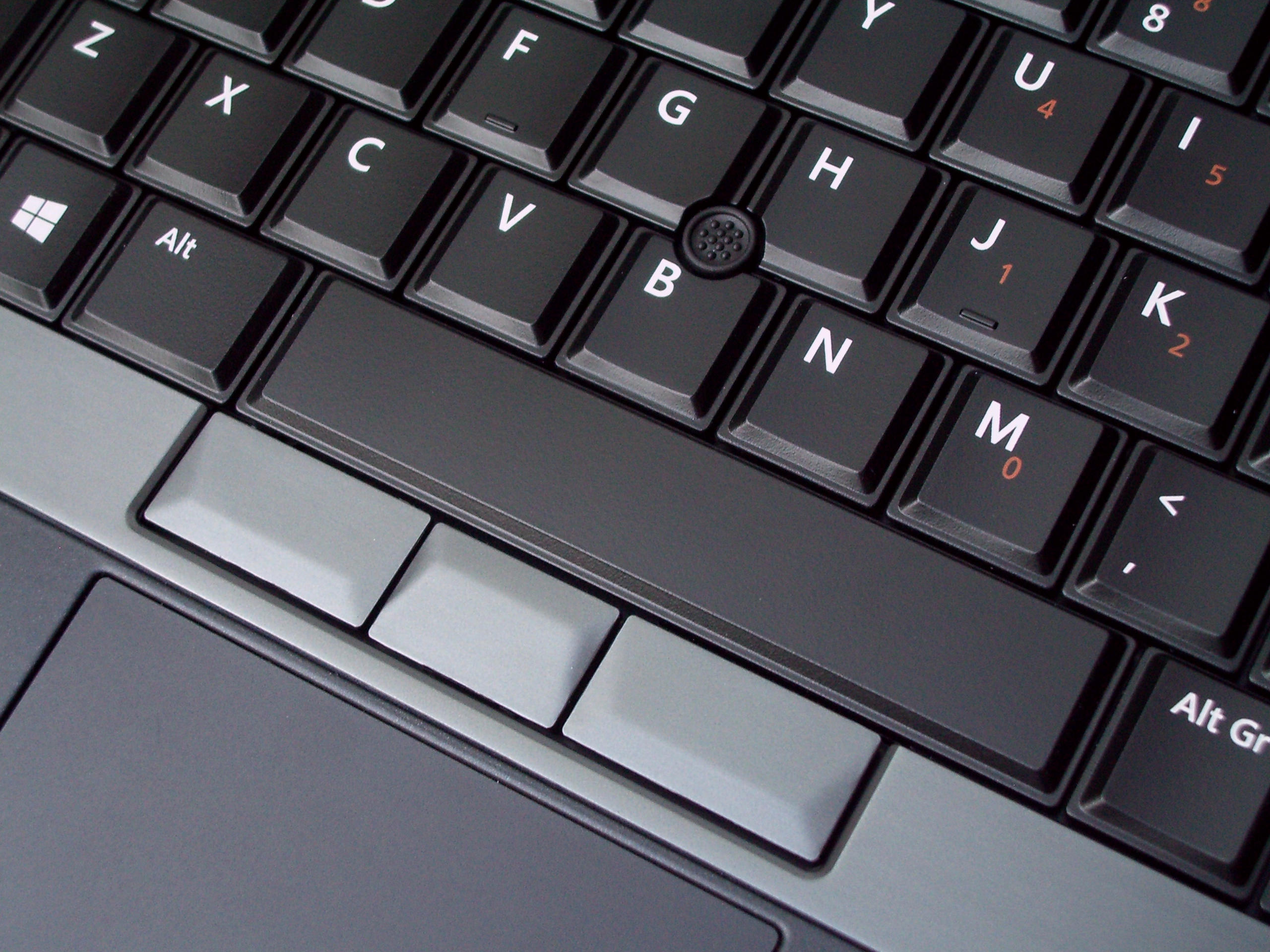
A Dell Latitude E6430 laptop with a pointing stick (upper middle) and a touchpad (bottom). They were commonly featured together on Dell Latitude laptops, beginning in the late 1990s.

The pointing stick can be used in ultra-compact netbooks where there would be no place for a touchpad.

=== Finger motion reduction ===
The pointing stick is positioned such that the hands do not need to be removed from the home row to manipulate the mouse pointer.

=== Continuous motion ===
Some people find them more appealing for mobile gaming than a touchpad, because the trackpoint allows infinite movement without repositioning. This is because a user's finger may run off the edge of a touchpad while positioning the pointer, requiring them to reposition their finger in order to continue.

=== Ergonomics ===
Some users feel that pointing sticks cause less wrist strain because a user does not need to avoid resting wrists on a touchpad, which are usually located just below the keyboard. One criticism is that because the pointing stick depends on the user's applying pressure, it can cause hand cramps (although this can be partly solved by setting the sensitivity higher and lifting the finger when the pointer is not being moved). Another criticism is that it stresses the index finger and may lead to repetitive strain injury.

A number of ergonomic studies to compare trackpoint and touchpad performance have been performed. Most studies find that touchpad is slightly faster; one study found that "the touchpad was operated 15% faster than the trackpoint". Another study found that average object selection time was faster with a touchpad, 1.7 seconds compared to 2.2 seconds with a trackpoint, and object manipulation took 6.2 seconds with a touchpad, on average, against 8.1 seconds with trackpoint.

== Naming and brands ==
Name	Brand	Current models	Past models	Color
Acer	FineTrack	None	TravelMate 6410, 6460, 6492, 6492G, 6592, 6592G, 6593	Green
Asus	SensePoint	ExpertBook P2	S200, S200N, S200Ne, S300N; ASUS pro: B8230UA; ADVANCED BU201	Black/Gray, Blue/Gray
Casio	?		Casio Cassiopeia series	
Dell	TrackStick, Dual Point	None	Latitude: 13": E4300, E4310, E6320, E6330, XT3; 14": E5400, E5410, E5420, E5430, E5440, E5450, E5470, 5480, 5490/95, E6420, E6430, E6430s, 6430u, E7440, E7450, E7470, 7480, 7490; 15": E5530, E5540, E5550, E5570, 5580, 5590, E6500, E6510, E6520, E6540; Retro Latitude: D400, D410, D420, D430, D600, D610, D620, D630, D800, D810, D820, D830, XT; Precision: M2300, M2400, M4300, M4400, M4500, M4600, M4700, M4800, M6700, M6800, M6400, M6500, 3510, 3520, 3530, 7510, 7520, 7530, 7540, 7710, 7720, 7730, 7740; Inspiron: 4000, 8100, 8200, 8600, 9100; L	Blue, black or gray
Elonex	Mouse emulator	None	Elonex ONE	Black
Fujitsu	StickPoint, QuickPoint, Quick Touch	None	Lifebook T2010, T2020, S7110, S7210, S7220, B2400/2500/2600 series, E8310 (optional), E8410 (optional), E8420 (optional), U1010/U810/U50, U820/U2010, P1100/1500/1600 series, P1620, P1610, P1630, P2120,	Black or blue
GPD	?	None	Pocket 1	Blue
HP	PointStick	All EliteBooks excluding 1000 series and Folio; Some ZBooks excluding Studio series; ProBook 6450b, 6455b & 6550b	All EliteBooks excluding 1000 series; all models ending with p or w; all models starting with nc, nw or c; 6445b (optional), 6545b (optional), tc4200, tc4400; Presario models starting with v, 8500	Black, orange or blue (older models)
JVC, Victor (InterLink)	Pointing Stick, Trackpoint		MP-XP3210, MP-XP5220, MP-XP7210, MP-XP7220, MP-XP7230, MP-XP7250, MP-XP731, MP-XP7310, MP-XP741, MP-XV631, MP-XP831, MP-XV841, MP-XV941	Blue/Gray
IBM, Lenovo	TrackPoint	All ThinkPads, excluding most Chromebooks; Travel Keyboard with Ultranav	Most ThinkPads, Space Saver II, Model M13, Model M4-1, Trackpoint IV, Trackpoint USB Keyboard, TransNote, Trackpoint Mouse	Red
NEC	NX Point	LaVie Nextreme	EasyNote MX45, MX65, S5	Dark Gray
Nintendo	C-Stick	None	New Nintendo 3DS, New Nintendo 3DS XL and New Nintendo 2DS XL	Gray
Samsung	Pointing stick	Series 6, Ativ Q	Series 4	All colors
Sony	Pointing stick	None	Sony Vaio Duo 11, Sony VAIO P series, BX series, C1 series, U8 series, UX series, X505, Sony PS3 Wireless Keyboard	None
Sprintek	FlexPoint	SK8707-01/SK8707-06 for Laptop/Tablet PC/Netbook/Industrial Keyboard	DIY keyboards	Red/Black
Dynabook (formerly Toshiba)	AccuPoint	Tecra R Series, Z Series and W Series, Portege Z Series and R Series	Portégé (not current models 06/2007), 300-7000 series, T3000 series; Tecra series 500-9000, A7, A8, A9, A10, A11, M2, M5, M9, M10, M11, S Series; Satellite Pro series 400-4000, T2000; Satellite 100-4000 series, Libretto 50CT, 70CT, 100CT	Green, blue
Unicomp	Pointing stick	EnduraPro (for desktop)	On-The-Stick, Mighty Mouse	Red

=== Informal names ===
Various informal names have been invented, including "nub", "clit mouse", which is an intercommunity term, usually seen on ThinkPad forums, and "nipple mouse".

== Other uses ==
While typically employed on a computer keyboard, IBM included one on its Trackpoint Mouse product; suggested uses included scrolling (as with a scroll wheel) or a dual-cursor system.

The New Nintendo 3DS handheld game console features a pointing stick that serve as the secondary analog stick, referred to by Nintendo as the "C-Stick"

== See also ==
- Analog stick
- Optical trackpad
