= Sony Entertainment Network =

Former digital service

- The Sony Entertainment Network Store webpage, c. 2013
- Developer: Sony Network Entertainment International
- Release: 10 February 2012
- Platform: PlayStation 4; PlayStation 3; PlayStation Portable; PlayStation Vita/PlayStation TV; PlayStation Mobile devices; Sony Tablet S; Sony Tablet P; BRAVIA HDTV; Sony Internet TV; Xperia; Walkman; Windows; iOS; Mac OS X
- Successor: PlayStation Network; Sony Pictures A Greener World
- Type: Online service
- Website: sonyentertainmentnetwork.com

Sony Entertainment Network (SEN) was a digital media delivery service operated by Sony Network Entertainment International (SNEI). SEN provided access to services, including PlayStation Network for games, Video Unlimited for film and television, Music Unlimited for music, and PlayMemories for photographs and videos. In January 2015, the Sony Entertainment Network was superseded by the PlayStation Network.

== History ==
Alternative logo used in some places

Sony Entertainment Network was first introduced on August 31, 2011 by Kaz Hirai, the president of Sony Computer Entertainment Inc., at the IFA tradeshow in Berlin, Germany. Sony decided to create the Sony Entertainment Network platform as a way for the community to access digital entertainment. The platform was operated by Sony Network Entertainment International, a subsidiary of Sony Corporation America. With the new name, also came new logos for the different services on the Sony Entertainment Network. Qriocity services were used by Sony as the video and music downloading platform; it was renamed Video Unlimited and Music Unlimited in 2011. This allowed Sony to expand the Music Unlimited service into Norway, Sweden, Finland, Denmark, the Netherlands, and Belgium by the end of 2011.

During 2012, the Sony Entertainment Network was released to the community and was available on Sony's different devices. Instead of using a web-serviced browser in their Bravia Televisions, it was decided by Sony to integrate the Music and Video Unlimited into the TV's home menu. The interface was purposely created for the Sony Entertainment Network and made it more accessible for users to access the services that Sony Entertainment Network offered.

On January 28, 2015, the Sony Entertainment Network, along with its Music Unlimited and Video Unlimited services, were fully absorbed into the PlayStation Network, succeeding SEN as Sony's leading entertainment service brand. Following this, Music Unlimited and Video Unlimited were rebranded as PlayStation Music and PlayStation Video, respectively.

== Services ==
=== Video Unlimited ===
Video Unlimited allowed users to purchase or rent videos. Purchases and rentals could be made online through the Sony Entertainment Network store, through the PlayStation Store on PlayStation 3, PlayStation 4, and PlayStation Vita, through the Video Unlimited store on many Sony Blu-ray disc players and Bravia TVs or via an Xperia smartphone and tablet app. The services provided customers with an easy and accessible way to watch and discover new movies and TV. Through the wide range of options Video Unlimited had, a user could choose from new movies, classic movies, or to keep up with a TV series. The use of logging in enabled the customer to easily choose and watch videos from anywhere, on devices that were compatible with Video Unlimited. Video Unlimited was later replaced by PlayStation Video.

=== Music Unlimited ===
Music Unlimited was a cloud-based music service. According to Sony, the music catalog contained 25 million songs and was available in 19 countries. There were two subscription levels: Basic/Access, which allowed for listening to all available music on Mac, PC, PlayStation 4 or PlayStation 3; and Premium, which added availability for mobile devices and Walkman players as well as Blu-ray players and Bravia TVs. Like other music services, Music Unlimited allowed users to create playlists, find new songs and songs that are recommended to them through their own taste of music. In 2013, special feature that made the Music Unlimited stand out was the ability to listen to music on a PlayStation 4 whilst playing a game. The service was replaced in 2015 by PlayStation Music with Spotify, which would become newly available in 41 countries and regions.

== Sony Entertainment Network Store ==
The interface through the Sony Entertainment Network Store was grouped into sections where users were able to see Top Rated Games, Latest Released Movies, DLC, Coming Soon, Deals and Offers, and PlayStation Plus. The top of the interface displayed the games, movies, and TV. The store was the main home to where users could search for different movies, games, and other media.

=== Games ===
The games section kept track of all of the games that were stored in the Sony Entertainment Network store. Games were used for users who wished to buy games for the PlayStation consoles, the main location for purchasing games on the Sony Entertainment Network.
