= Titmouse (disambiguation) =

Titmouse may refer to:

- Baeolophus, the genus of bird commonly known as titmice
- Tit (bird), the European titmouse
- Titmouse, Inc., a U.S. animation studio
- Pointing stick, a type of computer mouse
