= Sony Xperia Z2 tablet =

Android tablet by Sony

Xperia Z2 Tablet
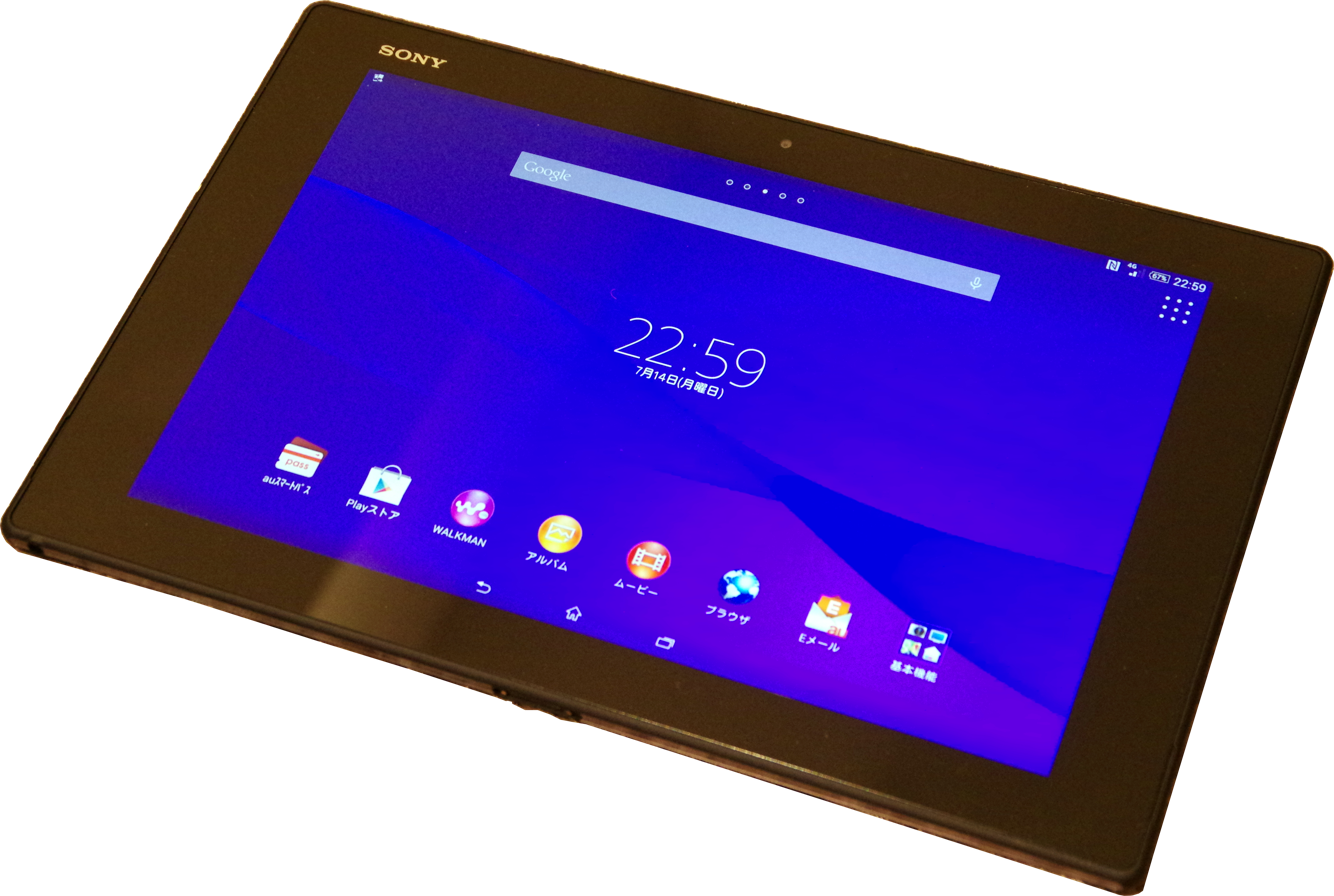
- Manufacturer: Sony
- Product family: Xperia series
- Type: Tablet computer
- Released: March 2014 (UK); July 2014 (USA)
- Operating system: Android 4.4.2 "KitKat" Upgradable to Android 6.0.1 "Marshmallow"
- CPU: Qualcomm MSM8974-AB Snapdragon 801; 2.3 GHz quad core Krait 400
- Memory: 3 GB RAM
- Storage: 16 GB internal storage microSD, microSDHC, microSDXC support up to 128 GB
- Display: 10.1 in (260 mm) IPS LCD display, 1920 by 1200 px, 224ppi
- Sound: Internal front facing stereo speakers
- Input: Multi-touch touchscreen display
- Camera: Rear: 8.1 MP, Exmor R, 1080p video recording mobile imaging engine and a backside illuminated sensor Front: 2.2 MP 1080p for video chat
- Connectivity: Wi-Fi 802.11a/b/g/n/ac Bluetooth 4.0; NFC; Miracast; 4G LTE
- Dimensions: 172mm x 266mm x 6.4 mm
- Weight: 439g
- Predecessor: Sony Xperia Tablet Z
- Successor: Sony Xperia Z4 Tablet
- Website: Official website

The Sony Xperia Z2 Tablet is a touchscreen Android tablet manufactured and designed by Sony. Like its predecessor, the Xperia Z2 tablet features a 10.1 inch screen and is water and dustproof with a rating of IP55 and IP58. The tablet is the lightest and thinnest 10.1-inch tablet, weighing at 1 pound (439 g) and is 0.25 inches (6.4 mm) thick, the Z2 Tablet features the Snapdragon 801 processor, Sony's Triluminos display and HDR video recording. Unveiled alongside the Sony Xperia Z2 during the 2014 Mobile World Congress in Barcelona, Spain, on February 24, it was first released on March 26, 2014 in the United Kingdom. On July 3, 2014, Sony launched its Xperia Z2 Tablet in India. On July 27, 2014 Sony released the Z2 Tablet in the US on Verizon.

The Tablet Z2 succeeds the Xperia Tablet Z with a faster processor, increased memory and a Live Colour LED IPS display for wider viewing angles and brighter colours.

== Specifications ==
=== Hardware ===
The capacitive IPS LCD of the device measures 10.1 inches with a WUXGA resolution of 1920 by 1200 pixels with a 224 ppi density. It features Sony's Triluminos display (Full HD) with Live Colour LED technology, used in Sony's Bravia branded televisions and Sony's live Color LED, which reproduces richer colors and more uniform backlighting. The tablet features a rear camera of 8.1 megapixels capable of video recording at a resolution of 1920 by 1080 pixels Sony's with Exmor R sensor and 16 times digital zoom. It also has a front-facing camera of 2.2 megapixels which is capable of video chatting at 1080p. The tablet weighs 439 g and measures 172 mm by 266 mm by 6.4 mm making it 68 g lighter and 0.5 mm thinner than the Tablet Z.

On the inside, it features a quad-core Krait 2.3 GHz Qualcomm Snapdragon 801 processor, and Adreno 330 GPU in addition to a sealed 6000 mAh battery, 3GB of RAM, 16GB internal storage and microSD, microSDHC, microSDXC support up to 128 GB. For connectivity, the tablet is NFC enabled, has Bluetooth 4.0, is DLNA certified, has MHL 3.0 support, has FM radio and also supports LTE.

The rear camera of the tablet has 8.1 megapixels with Exmor RS sensor and with full HD video recording capabilities while the front camera has 2.2 megapixels and is capable of 1080p video recording. The Xperia Tablet Z2 is NFC (Near Field Communication) enabled which can be used with Xperia SmartTags, NFC enabled accessories such as speakers or for low value financial transactions. It is also Ingress Protected to IP55/58 standards allowing for dust resistance and operation in up to 1.5m of freshwater for 30 minutes and comes with an infrared port which can be used as a remote control.

=== Software ===
The tablet comes with Android 4.4.2 KitKat (upgradable to Android 6.0.1 Marshmallow) and Sony's custom launcher on top, with some notable application additions such as Sony's Media applications (Walkman, Album and Videos). The tablet is NFC-enabled and allows 'screen mirroring' to mirror what is on the smartphone screen to compatible TVs or play music on a NFC-compatible wireless speaker. Additional features include Sony's battery 'Stamina Mode', which extends the tablet's standby length by up to 4 times. The Google suite of applications (such as Google Chrome, Play, Search, Maps and Plus) are also preloaded onto the tablet. Digital noise cancellation technology is also built into the tablet using a special set of Sony earphones which are not included with the tablet.

Xperia Tablet Z2 is also PlayStation Certified allowing users access to Sony's PlayStation Suite.

== Variants ==
The device is sold in Wi-Fi and 4G LTE versions although the 4G LTE version of the tablet may not be available in some countries. It is also available in black or white colours. The 4G LTE version was released after April 15. In Japan, there are carrier versions for KDDI Au and NTT Docomo. The Docomo version is a Summer 2014 model which features voice calling, VoLTE, OneSeg/FullSeg digital TV viewing/recording, as well as the more recently launched NOTTV digital broadcast television service. To implement this support, there is an extendable antenna, as well as an external co-ax antenna adapter which plugs into the USB port for indoor use. The Docomo and Au version features 32 GB of internal flash storage instead of the 16 GB found on most other variants. The Au version supports both LTE and WiMax connectivity.

== See also ==
- Sony Xperia Tablet Z
- Sony Xperia Z series
- Sony Xperia Z2
- Comparison of tablet computers

Preceded by Sony Xperia Tablet Z	Sony Xperia Z2 Tablet; 2014	Succeeded by Sony Xperia Z4 Tablet
