= Sony Vaio C1 series =

Series of subnotebooks

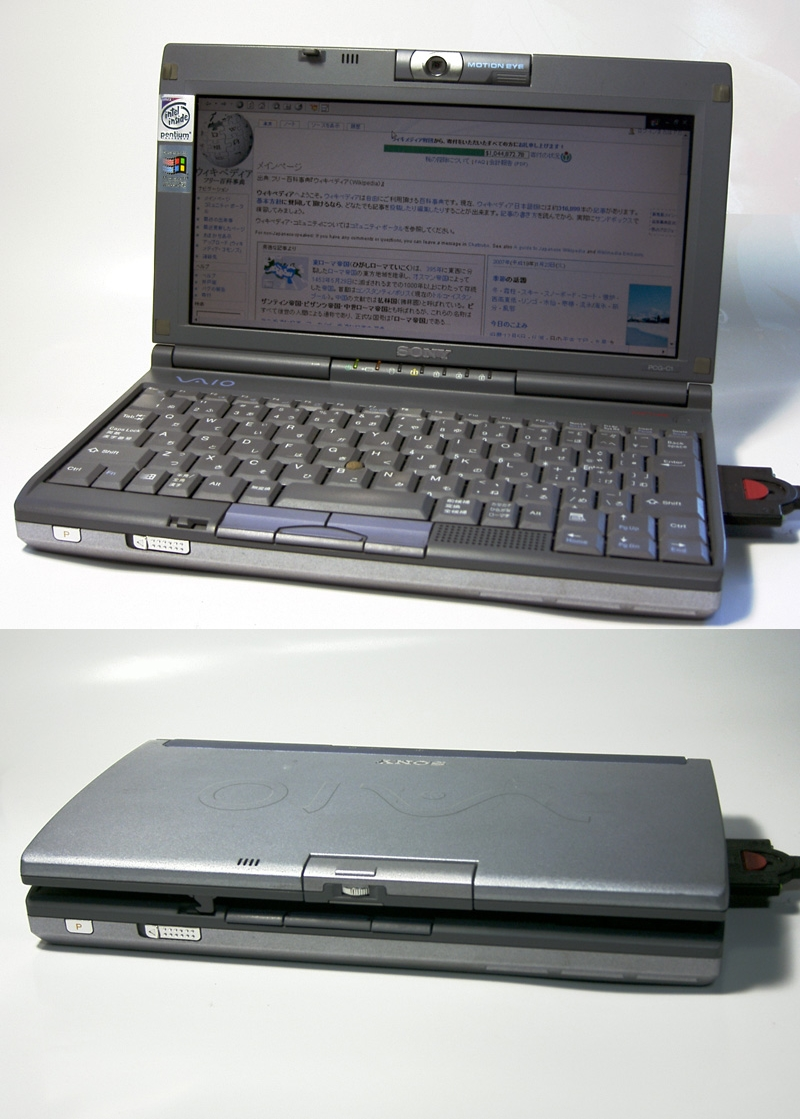
The original PCG-C1 model

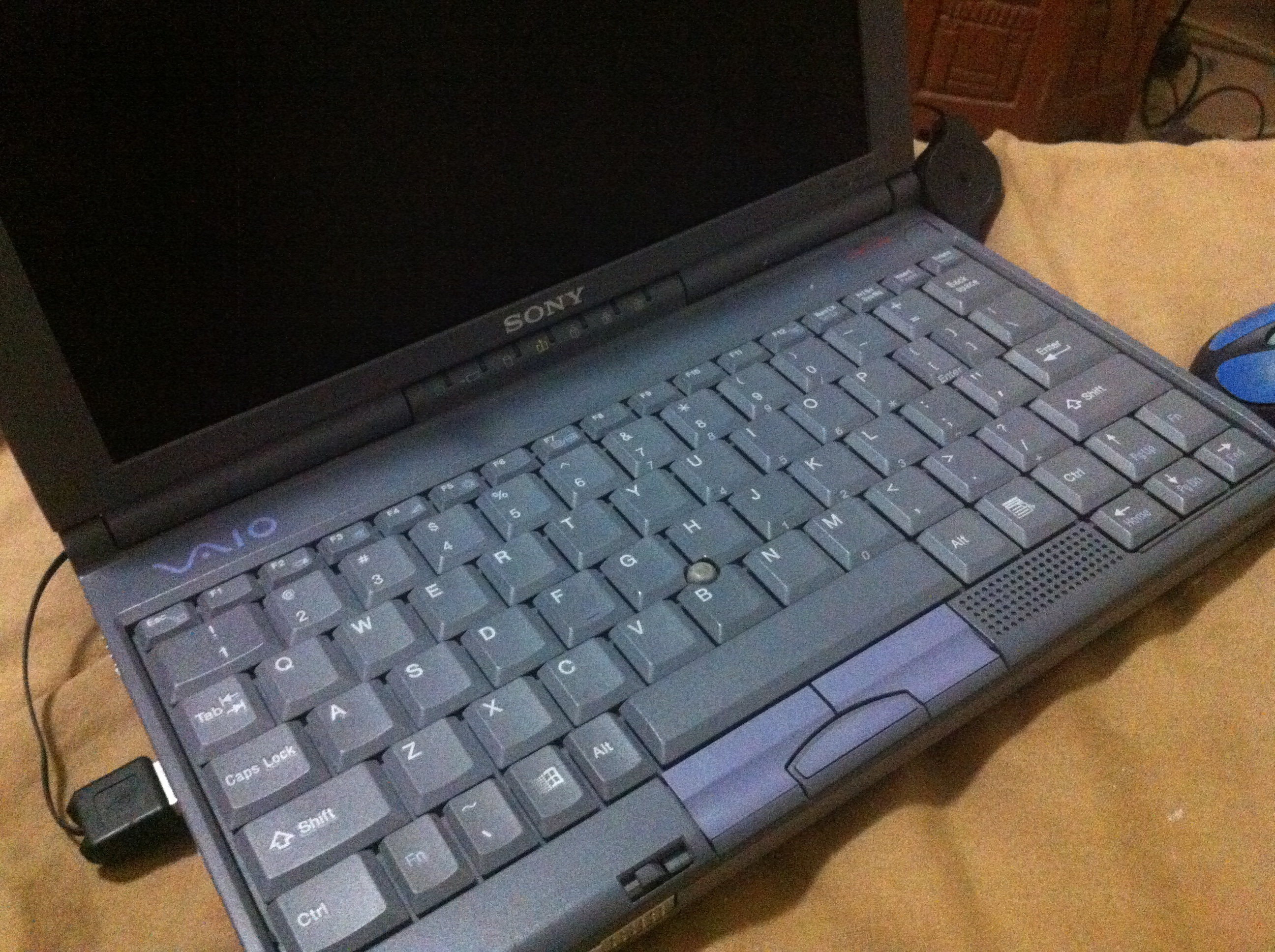
PCG-C1X

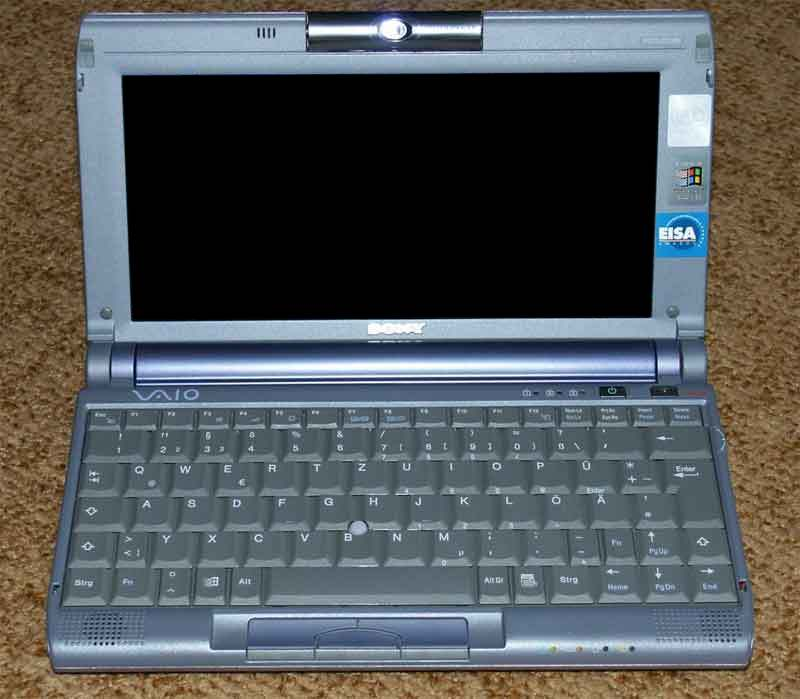

The Vaio C1 PictureBook was a series of subnotebooks from Sony's Vaio lineup, branded 'PictureBook' for its webcam and video capture capabilities, a first for portable computers. PictureBooks were lightweight computers, weighing 1kg (2.2 lb). They featured 8.9" LCD displays, and were notable for being the first consumer laptop with a built-in webcam.

The original model, the PCG-C1, was first released on September 19, 1998, in Japan only, with an initial production run of 5,000 units.

Subsequent revisions were released through the early 2000's, with improved display resolution, CPU, RAM and hard drive.

The C1 PictureBook series was succeeded by several other subnotebooks and UMPCs, most notably the UX series, and perhaps a direct successor to the C1's form factor, the P series.

== Models ==
=== Original revision ===
These original models had a single built-in mono speaker by the keyboard. The Intel Pentium and Microsoft Windows stickers were affixed beside the top left corner of the screen.

- PCG-C1 - Mobile Pentium MMX 233MHz CPU, 3.2GB hard drive, 64MB RAM, ultra-wide 8.9" 1024x480 TFT display, 0.27MP webcam, integrated modem, Windows 98 (September 1998). Japan market only.
- PCG-C1X - Mobile Pentium MMX 266MHz CPU, 4.3GB hard drive, Windows 98 (1999). First model one available in the U.S.
- PCG-C1F - same as C1X, but with U.K. localization
- PCG-C1R and PCG-C1S - same as C1X, but with Japan localization

=== 2nd revision ===
This revision featured built-in stereo speakers by the keyboard. The Intel and Microsoft Windows stickers were affixed beside the top right corner of the screen.

- PCG-C1XE - 8.1GB hard drive, 64MB RAM, 266MHz Intel Pentium II, Windows 98 (1999). Japan market only.
- PCG-C1XN - 12GB hard drive, 64MB RAM, 233MHz Intel Celeron, Windows 98 (January 2000).
- PCG-C1XS - 12GB hard drive, 64MB RAM, 400MHz Pentium II, Windows 98 (January 2000).
- PCG-C1XD - Same as the C1XS, but with German localization.
- PCG-C1XG/BP - Same as the C1XS, but with Japan localization.

=== 3rd revision ===
Beginning this revision, the C1 PictureBook shipped with Transmeta Crusoe processors.

- PCG-C1VN - first machine with Transmeta Crusoe CPU - TM5600 600MHz CPU, 128MB RAM, 12GB hard drive, ATI Rage Mobility 8MB, Windows ME (September 2000)
- PCG-C1VE - same as C1VN (September 2000)
- PCG-C1VP - same as C1VN, except Crusoe TM5600 667MHz CPU, 15GB hard drive, Windows 2000 Professional option (March 2001)
- PCG-C1VFK - same as C1VP, First Model with integrated Bluetooth 1.0 Adapter, Windows 2000 Pro (March 2001)
- PCG-C1VSX - same as C1VP, except choice of 15 or 30GB hard drive, no external monitor support and Bluetooth 1.0 and Windows 2000 Pro only
- PCG-C1VS/BW - same as C1VSX, except Crusoe 600MHz, 15GB hard drive, included PC Card CD-RW drive, support for external monitors, no Bluetooth and Windows ME only with Office XP preinstalled

=== 4th revision ===
Beginning this revision, the C1 PictureBook shipped with improved displays, bumping the resolution to 1280x600.

- PCG-C1MV - Crusoe TM5800 733MHz CPU, 256MB RAM, 20GB hard drive, ATI Mobility Radeon M 8MB, updated 1280x600 resolution, Windows XP Home or Professional (September 2001) -
- PCG-C1MW - same as C1MV, but with Crusoe 867MHz and 30GB hard drive (August 2002)
- PCG-C1MGP - Same as C1MV, but with 30GB hard drive, built-in Bluetooth 1.1, Windows XP Pro
- PCG-C1MRX - Same as C1MV, but with 30GB hard drive, built-in Bluetooth 1.1, bundled 802.11b Wi-Fi PC Card and XP Home only
- PCG-C1MR/BP - Same as C1MRX, but with Crusoe TM5600 667MHz CPU, 128MB memory, 20GB hard drive and forgoes the built-in Bluetooth and bundled Wi-Fi card.
- PCG-C1MSX - Same as C1MW, but with Japanese localization.
- PCG-C1MEL - Same as C1MW, but with Korean localization.
- PCG-C1MAH - Same as C1MW, but with Hong Kong localization.
- PCG-C1MHP - Same as C1MW, but with European localization.
- PCG-C1MZX - Same as C1MSX, but with Crusoe 933MHz. This was the last and most powerful model of the C1 series, and it was available only in Japan.
