= Sony Xperia Tablet S =

Tablet designed by Sony

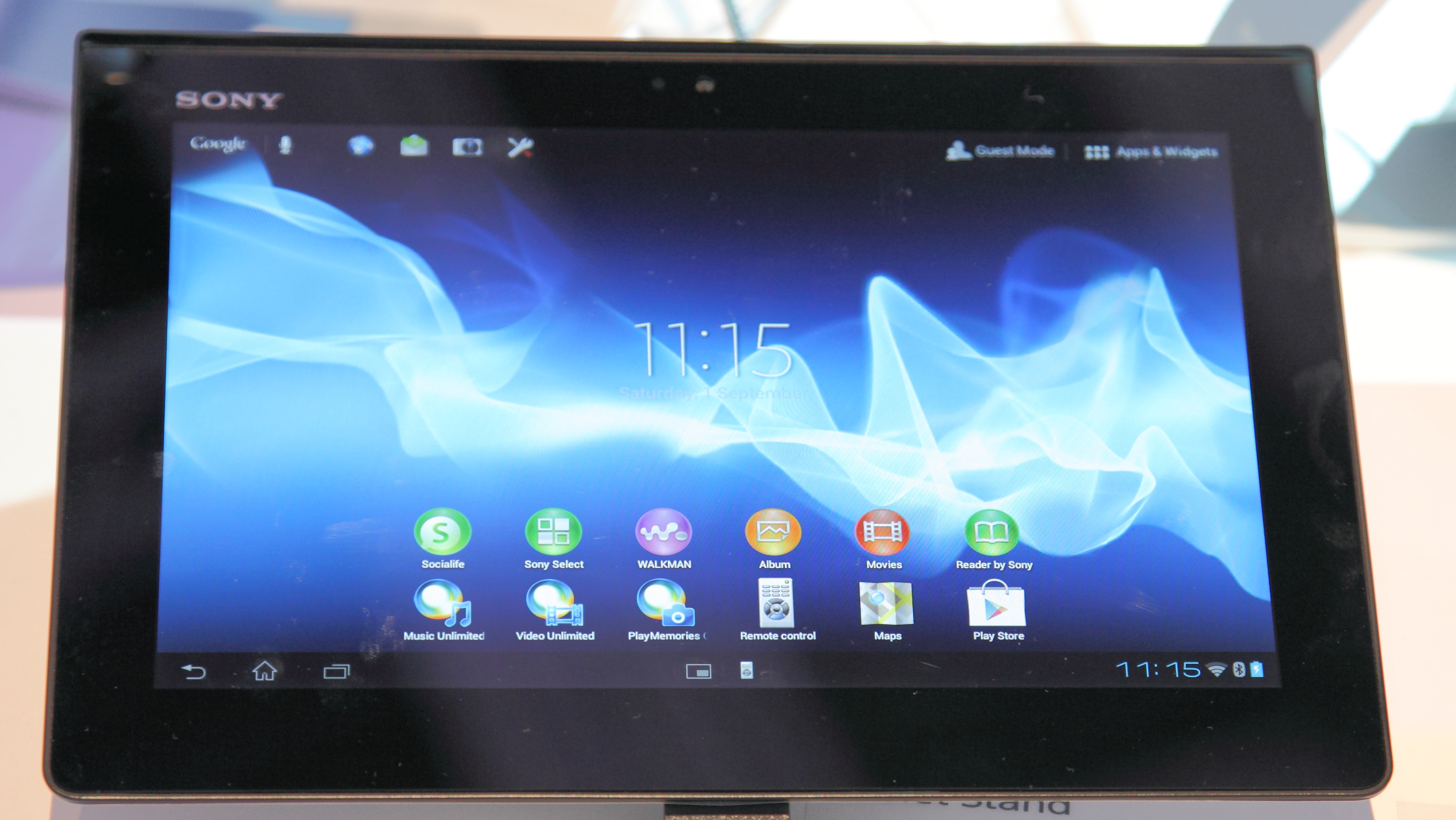
- Also known as: SGPT13
- Manufacturer: Sony Mobile
- Product family: Xperia series
- Type: Tablet computer
- Released: US: September 7, 2012; 14 years ago
- Operating system: Android 4.0.3 "Ice Cream Sandwich"; Upgradable to Android 4.1.2 "Jelly Bean"
- CPU: Nvidia Tegra 3, quad-core, 1.3 GHz
- Memory: 1 GB
- Storage: 16/32/64 GB
- Display: 1280x800 HD TFT LCD
- Sound: Internal speakers
- Input: Multi-touch touchscreen display
- Camera: Rear: 8.0 MP; Front: Yes
- Connectivity: Wi-Fi 802.11b/g/n 3G HSDPA in UK
- Weight: 585g (20.64oz)
- Predecessor: Sony Tablet S Sony Tablet P
- Successor: Sony Xperia Tablet Z
- Website: discover.store.sony.com/tablet/#intro

The Sony Xperia Tablet S is a touchscreen Android tablet designed by Sony Mobile as part of the Xperia series. It was announced at Internationale Funkausstellung Berlin (IFA) 2012, and debuted in the US on September 7, 2012. The tablet directly succeeded the Sony Tablet S, with a thinner and lighter design, a faster processor, and an improved camera. It is the first Sony tablet to be marketed with the Xperia branding and altogether succeeded the Sony Tablet branding.

== Hardware ==
The Xperia Tablet S features a magazine inspired design similar to its predecessor's, but the angle is less pronounced than in the original. It includes a full sized SD card slot, along with a proprietary Sony charging port and a 3.5 mm headphone jack. It also features an infrared blaster, which acts as a universal remote.

Sony advertised the tablet as "splash proof" with its multi-port cover installed. Sales of the tablet were suspended in October 2012 when it was discovered that a manufacturing error left gaps between the screen and the case, which compromises its waterproofing.

== Software ==
A modified version of Android 4.0.3 Ice Cream Sandwich ships on the tablet. Some alterations include the ability to add multiple user accounts and control of the tablet's IR blaster. It is now upgradeable to Android 4.1.2 Jelly Bean.

== Variants ==
The Xperia Tablet S is sold in 16 GB, 32 GB, and 64 GB models. These are Wifi-only in the US, but 3G/4G models are available in the UK.

== Reception ==
Critical reception has been mixed. In his review, Engadget writer Joseph Volpe stated that the Xperia Tablet S "misses the mark in everyday performance." However, David Pierce of The Verge gave the tablet a 7.6 out of 10, concluding that it had "no glaring flaws."

== See also ==
- Comparison of tablet computers

Preceded by Sony Tablet S	Sony Xperia Tablet S 2012	Succeeded by Sony Xperia Tablet Z
