= Sony Xperia Z4 Tablet =

Touchscreen Android tablet

Xperia Z4 Tablet
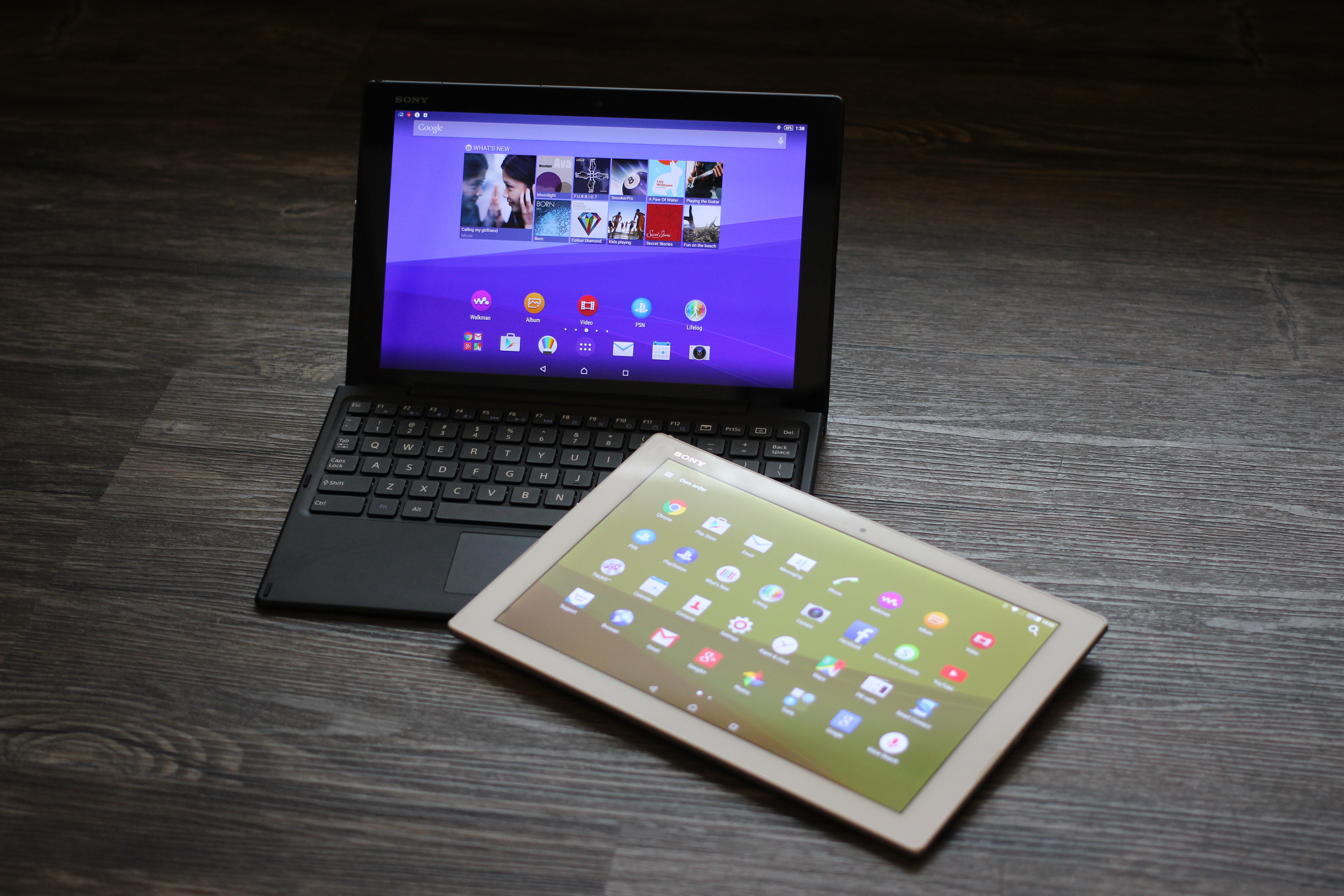
- Xperia Z4 Tablet (Black)
- Manufacturer: Sony Mobile
- Product family: Xperia series
- Type: Tablet computer
- Operating system: Android 5.0 Lollipop Upgradable to Android 7.1.1 Nougat
- System on a chip: Qualcomm Snapdragon 810
- CPU: Quad-core ARM Cortex A57 and quad-core A53 (64-bit support)
- Memory: 3 GB
- Storage: 32 GB internal storage
- Removable storage: microSD, microSDHC, microSDXC support up to 128 GB
- Display: 10.1 in (260 mm), 2560 by 1600 px (~299 ppi)
- Graphics: Adreno 430
- Sound: Internal front-facing stereo speakers
- Input: Multi-touch touchscreen display
- Camera: Rear: 8.1 MP, Exmor RS, 1080p video recording mobile imaging engine and a backside illuminated sensor Front: 5.1 MP 1080p for video chat
- Connectivity: Wi-Fi 802.11b/g/n/ac 4G LTE
- Dimensions: 167 × 254 × 6.1 mm
- Weight: 0.85 pound (389 g)
- Predecessor: Sony Xperia Z2 Tablet
- Website: Official website

The Sony Xperia Z4 Tablet is a touchscreen Android tablet manufactured and designed by Sony Mobile. Unlike its predecessor, the Xperia Z4 tablet features a 2560 × 1600 resolution 10.1-inch screen and is water and dustproof with a rating of IP65 and IP68. The tablet is lighter and thinner than its predecessor, weighing at 0.85 pound (389 g) for the WiFi model and 0.86 pound (393 g) for the LTE model and is 0.24 inches (6.1 mm) thick. The Z4 Tablet features the Snapdragon 810 processor and WQXGA resolution screen. It was announced on 2 March 2015 in a press conference held by Sony alongside the Sony Xperia M4 Aqua during the 2015 Mobile World Congress in Barcelona, Spain.

The Tablet Z4 succeeds the Xperia Tablet Z2 with a faster 64-bit processor, an improved front camera and a higher resolution display for brighter colours.

== Specifications ==
=== Hardware ===
The capacitive IPS LCD of the device measures 10.1 inches with a WQXGA resolution of 2560 by 1600 pixels with a 299 ppi density. Sony claims that the tablet's display is the world brightest as it was compared with other leading tablets. The tablet features a rear camera of 8.1 megapixels capable of video recording at a resolution of 1920 by 1080 pixels with Sony's Exmor RS sensor and 16 times digital zoom. It also has a front-facing wide-angle camera of 5.1 megapixels which is capable of video chatting at 1080p. The tablet weighs 389 g and measures 1670 mm by 2540 mm by 6.10 mm, making it 50 g lighter and 0.30 mm thinner than the Tablet Z2.

On the inside, it features a 64-bit Octa Core 2.0 GHz Qualcomm Snapdragon 810 processor, and Adreno 430 GPU in addition to a sealed 6000 mAh battery, 3 GB of RAM, 32 GB internal storage and microSD, microSDHC, microSDXC support up to 128 GB. For connectivity, the tablet is NFC-enabled, has Bluetooth 4.1, is DLNA certified, has MHL 3.0 support, has FM radio and also supports LTE.

The Xperia Tablet Z4 is NFC-enabled, which can be used with NFC-enabled accessories such as speakers or for low value financial transactions. It is also Ingress Protected to IP65/68 standards allowing for dust resistance and operation in up to 1.5m of freshwater for 30 minutes.

=== Software ===
The Xperia Z4 Tablet runs Android 5.0.2 Lollipop with Sony's custom launcher and some additional applications, such as Sony's media applications (Walkman, Album and Videos). As with most Android devices, it comes preloaded with a suite of Google apps. The tablet also includes PlayStation 4 Remote Play where the user can stream their PlayStation 4 games to the device.

== Variants ==
The device is sold in Wi-Fi and 4G LTE versions, although not all versions of the tablet may be available in some countries. (Some countries are not getting the LTE tablet, while others, like Malaysia, are not getting the Wi-Fi only model.) It is also available in black or white colours.

Preceded by Sony Xperia Z2 Tablet	Sony Xperia Z4 tablet 2015	Succeeded by Latest model
