= Sony Vaio P series =

Range of subnetbook PCs by Sony

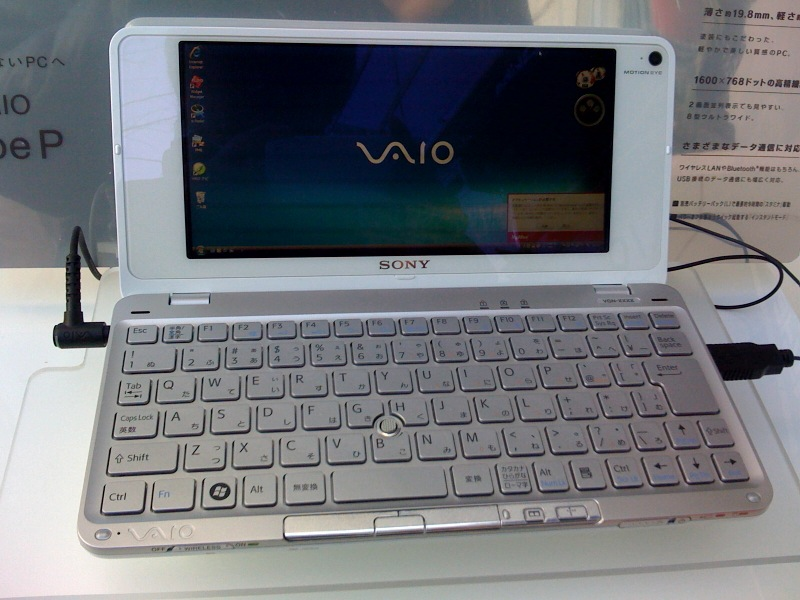
- Sony Vaio P series (2009 model)
- Developer: Sony
- Type: subnotebook
- Released: 2009

The Sony Vaio P series is a range of ultraportable subnotebook computers launched in January 2009.

It was marketed as a "lifestyle PC", although they share many characteristics with netbook computers.

== Description ==
The Sony Vaio P series features an 8" LED-backlit display with native resolution of 1600x768, coupled with Intel GMA 500 integrated graphics, an Intel Atom Silverthorne Z5x0 CPU with Intel Poulsbo US15W chipset, and up to 2GB of DDR2 memory. Notably, the P series sports non-upgradeable RAM that is soldered to the motherboard, with some models including just 1GB of RAM. It uses a pointing stick in the keyboard as its pointing device. Exact specs vary by region. An integrated "Motion Eye" webcam (optional in some models) is located on the upper right corner of the display bezel. Built-in GPS (some models), Bluetooth, 802.11 b/g/n wireless and 3G or HSDPA mobile broadband comprise its connectivity options. Like most ultraportables and netbooks, an internal optical drive is not present.

At launch, the pre-installed operating system was one of the 32-bit versions of Windows XP, which has lower resource requirements than Windows Vista. Several people have succeeded in installing various versions of Linux on the Vaio P, most notably Ubuntu Linux (Version 9.04, Jaunty). Ubuntu is arguably the best alternative due to its ease of installation and configuration, and the fact that it allows for full 3D graphics to be utilized. Since the release of Windows 7, the P series now ships with that OS installed. The P series has been criticized for poor performance in part due to the excessive pre-installed software, but also because of the poor performance of the integrated graphics.

Compared with most other Intel Atom-based netbooks, the P series was considerably more expensive. However, the Atom Silverthorne platform adopted by the P series sported lower power consumption and higher-clocked processor options compared to the more common Diamondville platform. Later models of the Vaio P included these faster CPUs. In addition, the P series is the lightest device in its class, weighing roughly the same as the Apple iPad 2 tablet and less than all 10" netbooks, and the 7" Asus Eee PC models. The 1600x768 resolution of the P series' 8" display is also comparable to that of much larger laptops, such as the 12.1" ThinkPad X200s and its 1440x900 resolution.

=== May 2010 update ===
The VPC-P11 series launched in May 2010 featured a refreshed exterior, an accelerometer to enable switching from landscape to portrait mode, a tiny 16x16mm touchpad built into the LCD bezel, and a choice of five colours - 'electric orange, neon green, hot pink, icy white and classic black'. In addition, a button was added to instantly switch the screen to 1280x600 resolution, in order to make text more readable, as well as a digital compass, ambient light sensor, and higher-capacity battery (2500mAh).

The 2010 revision was the last iteration of the P series, with Sony discontinuing the product in 2011. The P series clamshell format was incorporated in Sony's Tablet P, which was released in November 2011.

== Specifications ==
- Dimensions: 9.65"(W) x 0.78"(H) x 4.72"(D); 24.5 cm(W) x 2 cm(H) x 12 cm(D)
- Weight: 1.3 lbs (589g, VPC-P11 series); 1.4 lbs (635g, at launch with SSD), 1.5 lbs (680g, at launch with HDD)
- Processor: Intel Atom single-core (with Hyperthreading) Z520, Z530, Z540, Z550 or Z560, at 1.33, 1.6, 1.87, 2.0, or 2.13 GHz; Z560-equipped models were not released in the US
- Graphics: Intel GMA 500
- Memory: 1 or 2 GB DDR2 SDRAM running at 533 MHz
- Storage: 60 or 80 GB 4200 RPM PATA HDD, or 64 GB, 128 GB or 256 GB SSD
- Connectivity: Wi-Fi 802.11 b/g/n, Integrated Stereo A2DP Bluetooth technology, wireless broadband (technology used varies by region, including WiMax, HSDPA and 3G), GPS (model-dependent)
- Display: 8" 1600x768 LED TFT active matrix backlit display, 0.3 MP webcam
- Expansion Slots: Memory Stick (Standard/Duo) media slot, SD/SDHC memory card slot
- Interface: 2 USB 2.0 type-A ports, DC-in, Display/LAN Adapter port, headphone jack
- Battery at launch: standard 2100mAh (145 g), extended 4200mAh (263 g)
- Battery for VPC-P11 series: standard 2500mAh (155 g), extended 5000mAh (250 g)

== USA models ==
(note color codes: /G - Emerald Green, /Q Glossy Black, /R Sangria Red, /W Dove White, /N gold, /P /PI pink, /D white, /B black)

=== Launch dates ===
VGN-P500 series - January/February 2009
VGN-P600 series - July 2009
VGN-P700 series - October 2009
VPC-P11 series - May 2010

Model	Color	Processor	Memory	Storage Drive	Operating System	Release Price (USD)
VGN-P530H	Green/Black/Red/White	Intel Atom Z520 @ 1.33 GHz	2 GB DDR2	60 GB HDD	Windows Vista Home Basic 32-bit	$899.99
VGN-P530N	Green/Black/Red/White	Intel Atom Z520 @ 1.33 GHz	2 GB DDR2	60 GB HDD	Windows Vista Business 32-bit	$1099.99
VGN-P588E	Green/Gold/Black/Red/White	Intel Atom Z520 @ 1.33 GHz	2 GB DDR2	64 GB SSD	Windows Vista Home Premium 32-bit	$1,199.99
VGN-P598E	Black/Red	Intel Atom Z530 @ 1.33 GHz	2 GB DDR2	128 GB SSD	Windows Vista Home Premium 32-bit	$1,499.99
VGN-P599E	Black	Intel Atom Z540 @ 1.86 GHz	2 GB DDR2	256 GB SSD	Windows Vista Home Premium 32-bit	$1,899.99
VGN-P688E	Black/White	Intel Atom Z520 @ 1.33 GHz	2 GB DDR2	64 GB SSD	Windows Vista Home Premium 32-bit	$999.99
VGN-P698E	Black	Intel Atom Z530 @ 1.6 GHz	2 GB DDR2	128 GB SSD	Windows Vista Home Premium 32-bit	$1,499.99
VGN-P720K	Red	Intel Atom Z520 @ 1.33 GHz	2 GB DDR2	80 GB HDD	Windows 7 Home Premium 32-bit	$849.99
VGN-P788K	Gold	Intel Atom Z530 @ 1.6 GHz	2 GB DDR2	64 GB SSD	Windows 7 Home Premium 32-bit	$999.99
VGN-P798K	Black	Intel Atom Z540 @ 1.86 GHz	2 GB DDR2	128 GB SSD	Windows 7 Home Premium 32-bit	$1,499.99
VGN-P799L	Black	Intel Atom Z550 @ 2 GHz	2 GB DDR2	256 GB SSD	Windows 7 Home Premium 32-bit	$1,899.99
VPC-P111KX	Black/Pink/Green/White	Intel Atom Z530 @ 1.6 GHz (no GPS)	2 GB DDR2	64 GB SSD	Windows 7 Home Premium 32-bit	$799.99
VPC-P113KX	Black/Pink/Green/White/Orange	Intel Atom Z530 @ 1.6 GHz (no GPS)	2 GB DDR2	128 GB SSD	Windows 7 Home Premium 32-bit	$899.99
VPC-P114KX	Black	Intel Atom Z530 @ 1.6 GHz (no GPS)	2 GB DDR2	128 GB SSD	Windows 7 Home Premium 32-bit	$999.99
VPC-P116KX	Pink	Intel Atom Z540 @ 1.87 GHz (with GPS)	2 GB DDR2	128 GB SSD	Windows 7 Home Premium 32-bit	$1499.99
VPC-P118KX	Black	Intel Atom Z550 @ 2 GHz (with GPS)	2 GB DDR2	256 GB SSD	Windows 7 Home Premium 32-bit	$1499.99

== See also ==
- Sony VAIO C1 series
- Vaio
- Netbook
- UMPC
