= Sony Tablet =

Discontinued series of tablets

- Developer: Sony
- Type: Tablet computer
- Released: September 16, 2011; 15 years ago (Tablet S Wi-Fi); October 28, 2011; 14 years ago (Tablet S Wi-Fi+3G); October 28, 2011; 14 years ago (Tablet P Wi-Fi); April 21, 2012; 14 years ago (Tablet P Wi-Fi+3G)
- Discontinued: 2012
- Operating system: Android
- Online services: Sony Entertainment Network, PlayStation Suite, Sony Reader Store, Android Market
- Related: Sony Reader

Sony Tablet (ソニー・タブレット) is a discontinued series of Android-based tablet computers, produced from 2011 to 2012 by Sony Corporation. Two models were released: Sony Tablet S and Sony Tablet P.

It was succeeded by the Sony Xperia Tablet S which is part of the mobile unit under the Xperia brand name.

== History and development ==
Sony's Vaio division had released tablet-like products before, such as the Sony Vaio U series in 2004. Its first tablet computer however was the Airboard, which was released in Japan in 2000 and the brainchild of Satoru Maeda.

On April 26, 2011, Sony announced that it would be developing two Android tablets, codenamed S1 and S2. The S1 (which became the Tablet S) was said to be "optimized for rich media entertainment" while the S2 (later Tablet P) would be "ideal for mobile communication and entertainment".

On 15 June 2011, Sony released the first in a series of five videos titled "Two Will", promoting and featuring the Tablets in an elaborately designed Rube Goldberg Machine. The episodes are entitled:

- Prologue
- The First Impression
- Going smoothly
- Filled with fun
- Together anywhere

== Tablet S and P ==
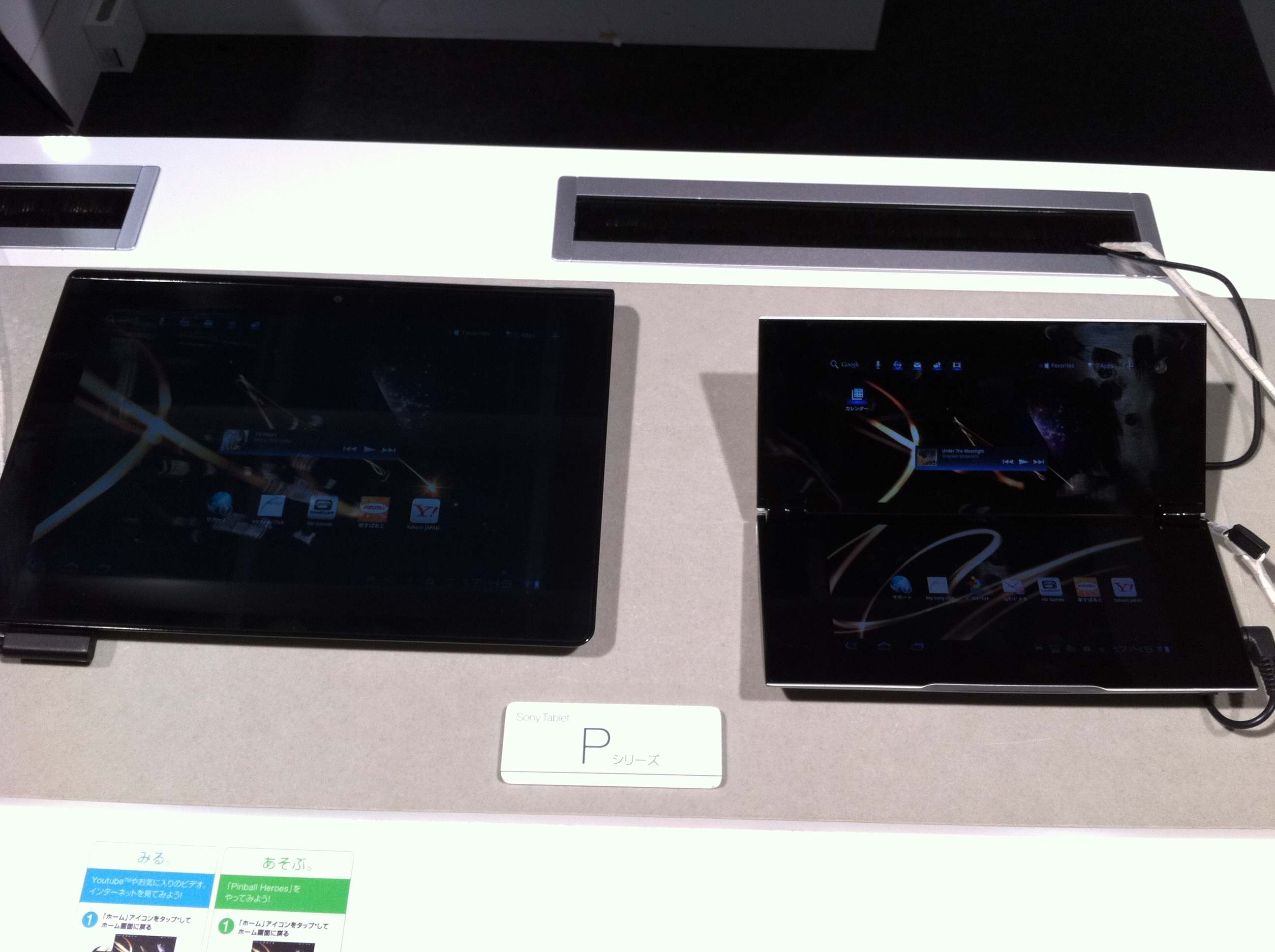
Tablet S (left) and Tablet P (right) on display

The models originally ran Google's operating system Android 3.1 Honeycomb. The first models were informally announced on 26 April 2011, using the code names, by Sony in the Sony IT Mobile Meeting. They featured touchscreens, two cameras (a rear-facing 5 MP, a front-facing 0.3 MP), infrared sensor, Wi-Fi. Also, they support PlayStation Suite, DLNA, and are 3G/4G compatible. The retail price in the U.S at the time of release was US$499–599. In Europe, prices were at €499. To increase the number of apps available and provide marketing support for both tablets, Sony and Adobe Systems will hold a $200,000 competition targeting app developers. The series was formally launched in Berlin and Tokyo on 31 August 2011.

The Sony Tablet S (former code name Sony S1) has one 9.4-inch (240 mm) touchscreen display in a slate layout, and a unique wrap design inspired by the way some persons fold magazines while reading them. In landscape orientation, the unit along the top is about three times thicker than along the bottom, forming a mild slant. It was released on 11 September 2011, as the first available member of the Sony Tablet series. The suggested retail prices are $499 for the 16 GB model and $599 for the 32 GB model. In early reviews in late 2011, the units compared favorably to similar high-end tablets.

== See also ==
- Comparison of tablet computers
- Sony Xperia
- iPad
