= PlayStation Video =

Defunct online film and television programme distribution service

- Release: July 15, 2008; 17 years ago
- Platform: Windows PCs via Media Go; Bravia TVs; Xperia mobile phones and Sony Tablets; PlayStation Portable; PlayStation Vita; PlayStation 3 PlayStation 4 PlayStation 5 Android iOS
- Website: playstationnetwork.com/video

PlayStation Video (formerly known as Video Unlimited) was an online film and television program distribution service that first was offered by Sony Entertainment Network on July 15, 2008.

On behalf of studios such as Sony Pictures, 20th Century Studios, Warner Bros. Pictures, Universal Pictures, Metro-Goldwyn-Mayer Pictures, Paramount Pictures, and Lionsgate, Video Unlimited distributed television episodes and new release films as well as a variety of older movies. In November 2010, Video Unlimited began distributing online content in the United Kingdom, France, Germany, Italy, and Spain and later expanded into Japan, Canada, and Australia as well. Their redistribution content could be accessed through personal computers and other devices such as Sony Blu-ray players, PlayStation consoles, Xperia smartphones and Sony tablets, Bravia televisions and some portable music players.

On March 2, 2021, Sony announced that it would discontinue offering new purchases and rentals of movies and TV shows through PlayStation Video on August 31. PlayStation said that movie purchases prior to that date would still be viewable to owners via the PlayStation Store.

== See also ==
- PlayStation Vue
