= Sony Tablet P =

Tablet computer

- Sony Tablet P, open and closed top views
- Manufacturer: Sony
- Type: Booklet
- Released: November 2011
- Introductory price: $599
- Discontinued: December 2012
- Operating system: Original: Android 3.2 "Honeycomb"; Current: Android 4.0.4 "Ice Cream Sandwich"
- CPU: Nvidia Tegra 2, 1Ghz, Dual core
- Memory: (1 GB)
- Display: two 5.5 in (14 cm) 1024x480 px
- Dimensions: 180 mm (7.1 in) H 158 mm (6.2 in) W 14 mm (0.55 in) D thickest
- Weight: 372 g (0.820 lb)
- Successor: Sony Xperia Tablet S

The Sony Tablet P (former code name Sony S2) is a tablet computer that was manufactured by Sony as part of the Sony Tablet series.

== Description ==
It was released as the Android version of the Sony Vaio P, which also had a wide screen.

It has two 5.5-inch (140 mm) touchscreen interoperating displays joined in a hinged clamshell layout, resembling the VAIO P series. It was released in November 2011, as the second available member of the Sony Tablet series. The suggested retail price is $599.

While the unique clamshell design allowed the device to fold in half and fit into a pocket, this feature resulted in the screen being split in half by a large, black hinge, which made playing games and reading awkward and is cited as the Tablet P's most serious flaw. The Tablet P was discontinued in North America by the end of 2012 and received its final software update to Android 4.0.4 shortly after.

== Reception ==
The Verge praised the innovative design but noted that third-party apps not optimized for the dual screens offered a poor experience. It was retrospectively called a flopped product.

== See also ==
- Surface Duo
- Kyocera Echo
- Dual-touchscreen
