= Sony Vaio U series =

Subnotebook computers

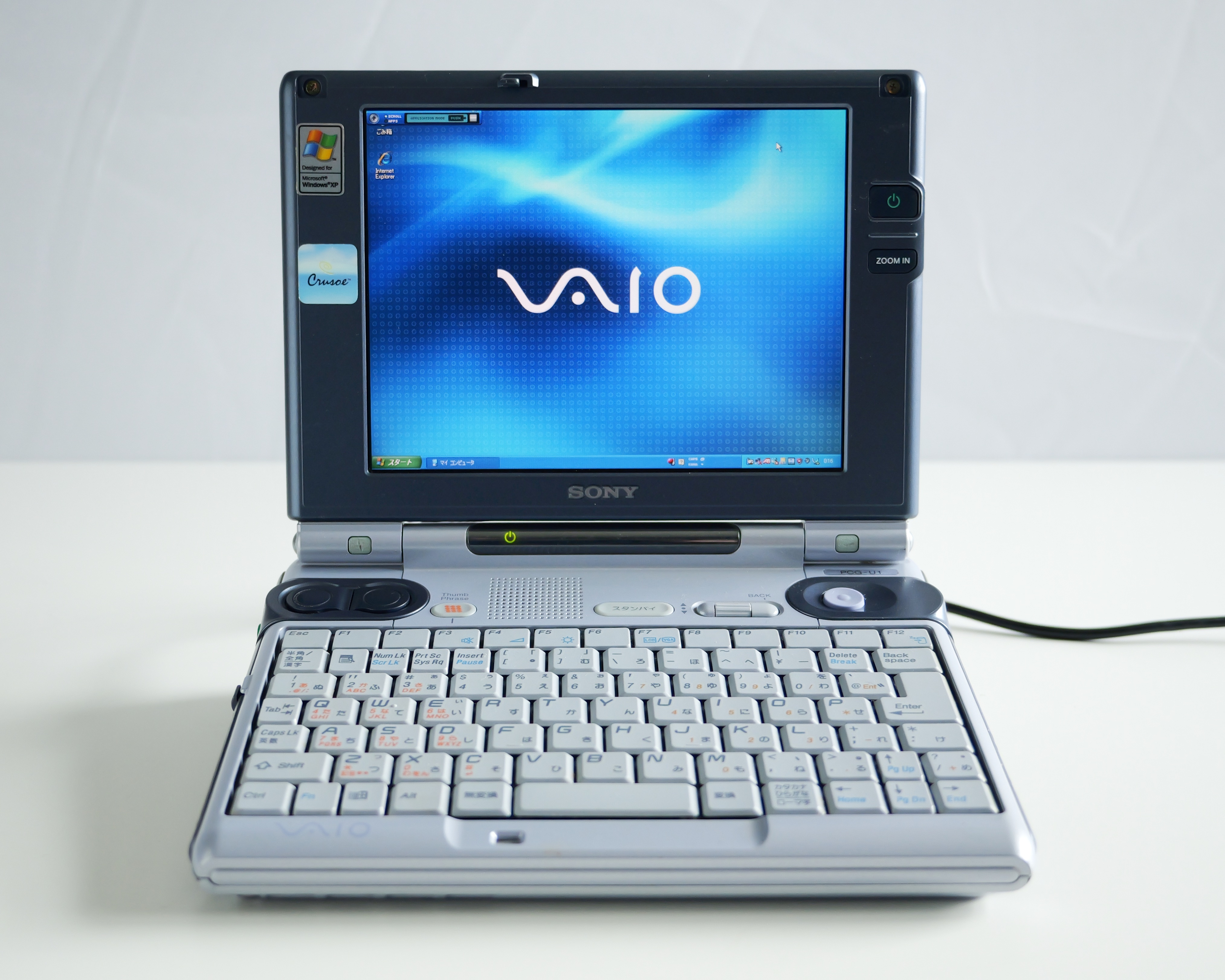
Sony VAIO PCG-U1

The Sony U series of subnotebook computers refers to two series of Sony products the PCG-U and the VGN-U. The later VGN-U were, at their release, the smallest independent computers running Windows XP and the most powerful high-end subnotebooks at the time. The VGN-U50 and VGN-U70P models are roughly the size of two DVD cases stacked on top of each other.

The first models of the series to come out were the VGN-U50 and the VGN-U70P in Japan. The American model is the VGN-U750P. A VGN-U8G model was introduced for some south Asian countries.

== Technical specifications ==
Model	Year introduced	Processor (CPU)	Display	Graphics (GPU)	Memory (RAM)	Storage	Audio	Operating System	Dimensions and weight	Notes
PCG-U1	2002	Transmeta Crusoe TM5800 @ 867 MHz	6.4" w/1024×768 resolution	ATI Mobility Radeon M6 w/8 MB VRAM	128 MB	20 GB 1.8" HDD		Windows XP Home Edition	184 mm × 139 mm × 46 mm, 860 g	
PCG-U3	2002	Transmeta Crusoe TM5800 @ 933 MHz	6.4" w/1024×768 resolution	ATI Mobility Radeon M6 w/8 MB VRAM	256 MB	20 GB 1.8" HDD		Windows XP Home Edition	184 mm × 139 mm × 46 mm, 860 g	
PCG-U101	2003	Intel Celeron M @ 600 MHz	7.1" w/1024×768 resolution	ATI Mobility Radeon w/16 MB VRAM	256 MB	30 GB 1.8" HDD		Windows XP Home Edition Service Pack 1	178 mm × 139 mm × 34 mm, 880 g	
VGN-U50	2004	Intel Celeron M @ 900 MHz	5" with 800×600 resolution	Intel 855GM	256 MB	20 GB 1.8" HDD		Windows XP Home Edition Service Pack 1	167 mm x 108 mm x 26.4 mm, 550 g	
VGN-U70P	2004	Intel Pentium M @ 1 GHz	5" with 800×600 resolution	Intel 855GM	512 MB	20 GB 1.8" HDD		Windows XP Professional Service Pack 1	167 mm x 108 mm x 26.4 mm, 550 g	
VGN-U8G	2004	Intel Celeron M @ 900 MHz	5" with 800×600 resolution	Intel 855GM	256 MB	20 GB 1.8" HDD		Windows XP Home Edition Service Pack 1	167 mm x 108 mm x 26.4 mm, 550 g	Rebranded VGN-U50 for the Singapore market
VGN-U8C	2004	Intel Celeron M @ 900 MHz	5" with 800×600 resolution	Intel 855GM	256 MB	20 GB 1.8" HDD		Windows XP Home Edition Service Pack 1	167 mm x 108 mm x 26.4 mm, 550 g	Rebranded VGN-U50 for the Chinese market
VGN-U750P	2004	Intel Pentium M 733 @ 1.1 GHz	5" with 800×600 resolution	Intel 855GM	512 MB	20 GB 1.8" HDD		Windows XP Professional Service Pack 2	167 mm x 108 mm x 26.4 mm, 550 g	Rebranded VGN-U71P for the US market with 20GB HD instead of 30GB
VGN-U71P	2004	Intel Pentium M 733 @ 1.1 GHz	5" with 800×600 resolution	Intel 855GM	512 MB	30 GB 1.8" HDD		Windows XP Professional Service Pack 2	167 mm x 108 mm x 26.4 mm, 550 g	

Additional specification for VGN-U series

- Display: 5 in (127 mm) SVGA, 800×600, 16 million colors, touchscreen
- Keyboard: 87 keys, English/Japanese layout (connects via USB, does not attach to unit)
- Expansion ports:
  - Sony Memory Stick
  - CompactFlash Type-II (can be used as 16-bit PCMCIA with proper adapter)
- Soundcard: PCM 16-bit audio, mono speaker, stereo headphone jack
- Mouse: TrackStik (trackpoint-like) with 2+1 buttons (left, right, middle)
- Handwriting recognition software: RitePen; also compatible with third-party alternatives such as PenOffice

Other:

- Transflective LCD for headphone remote, time display
- 1 USB 2.0 Port
- Power supply: AC 100/240 V (50/60 Hz) – DC 16 V/2.2 A/? W
- Size: 167 × 108 × 26.4 mm
- Weight: 550 g (incl. battery)
- Hard disk drive
  - 20 GB Ultra-ATA100 [U70P/U750P/U50/U8G]
    - Toshiba MK2004GAL (DC 3.3 V, 500 mA)
  - 30 GB Ultra-ATA100 [U71P]
- Floppy disk drive: None (optional accessory)
- Optical storage
  - None (optional accessory) [U70P/U50/U750P/U71P]
  - DVD+/-RW Drive (external slim) [U8G]
    - PCGA-DDRW2 (Firewire – DC 10 V, 1.5 A)

Docking station:

- 4 additional USB 2.0 ports
- i.Link 4-pin FireWire port
- 10/100 Intel PRO/100 VE Ethernet
- VGA port

== Advanced technical information for the VGN-U series ==
=== CPU ===
The Pentium-M series CPU (1.0 GHz, 1.1 GHz) supports SpeedStep, which allows the processor to slow down when not under load, using less power and prolonging battery life. The 1.1 GHz is a Dothan generation processor, and has a 2 MB cache, whereas the 1.0 GHz is a Banias generation CPU with only 1 MB of cache. The 900 MHz Celeron-M does not support SpeedStep, and has only 512 KB cache. Despite the Celeron-M's performance shortcomings, benchmarks show the arithmetic performance difference is marginal. Much of the performance increase seems to result from having a total of 512 MB of memory. Battery life of the Pentium-M series is said to be anywhere from 30 to 45 minutes over the Celeron-M model as a result of having SpeedStep.

=== Display ===
The internal display is a custom transflective panel made by Sony with a resolution of 800x600 pixels. The integrated Intel 855GM graphics card can display a maximum of 16 million colors. Connecting an external monitor to the VGA port of the docking station enables a maximum resolution of 1600x1200x16m. The graphics supports display cloning or extended desktop when using an extended monitor, and also supports OpenGL and Direct3D hardware acceleration, with a performance approximating that of a Radeon 7000 or a GeForce 1. With updated drivers from Intel, the ability to rotate the screen in 90, 180 and 270 degree modes is enabled.

The brightness of the internal display is adjustable. The brightness control has nine levels, and also the ability to turn the backlight off in direct sunlight.

The display is very small, roughly 5 inches (127 mm) diagonal; it may cause some eyestrain if used for prolonged periods. The high DPI resolution offers excellent viewing of images and video.

=== Keyboard ===
Sony VGP-KBC1 Foldable Keyboard, The compact USB keyboard resembles a laptop keyboard. It folds in the middle, and has a TrackStik mouse pointer in the center. When folded, the unit is approximately the same width and height of the U-series unit, and about half the thickness. Original U50 and U70p units had a faulty Synaptics driver which sometimes caused USB HID input device conflicts. Recent driver updates have resolved this issue.

=== TrackStik and mouse buttons ===
The pointing-head is on the right side of the unit below the directional pad. The mouse buttons are on the left side of the unit, no matter what orientation it is used in. When rotated into portrait mode, the options key, brightness, and onscreen keyboard button are remapped to the mouse buttons, and the previous mouse buttons become the new modifier buttons.

The TrackStick has a rubber tip that can be worn out after repeated use. User could get a replacement tip from Sony parts.

=== CompactFlash slot ===
This slot can accommodate a Type-II CompactFlash device, provided there are Windows XP drivers for such a device. It will accept all valid CompactFlash memory cards. Some memory cards pulled from sealed MP3 devices such as iPods have been crippled as so not to be fully compliant as a regular memory card, and may not work.

=== Memory Stick slot ===
The Sony Memory Stick slot is underneath the CompactFlash slot. It will accept only Memory Stick memory storage cards; Wi-Fi and Bluetooth cards will not work as there are no Windows XP drivers for any such Memory Stick IO devices at this time.

=== Headset connectors ===
There is one headset connector on the left hand side of the unit, above the button-hold switch. It also has an extended port for a headphone remote control unit, which allows one to control audio playback and read current track information. There are a couple extensions available to allow Windows Media Player and Winamp to display output to the controller unit.

=== Rechargeable battery ===
There are two OEM batteries available, and now some aftermarket enhanced models. The stock one that comes with all units lasts approximately two to three hours, depending on usage. An extended battery is available as an option, is about twice the thickness of the stock battery, and lasts approximately twice as long as the stock battery.

=== Power supply ===
The iGo Juice and other third party adapter manufacturers make power supplies that are compatible with the U series. The power tip is compatible with many other Sony models, including the Z505, and possibly some Fujitsu models. Users are advised to check voltage, current and power ratings to ensure compatibility.

=== RAM & upgrading ===
On all models, the memory is on a proprietary daughtercard manufactured by Sony. This card has a proprietary interface, and is incompatible with all currently known memory cards. The memory is DDR 266 MHz. On models with 512 MB, the memory is maxed out. On models with 256 MB, the memory card can be removed and replaced with a 512 MB card, currently only available in Japan, but occasionally rarely found in the United States, and usually at extremely high prices.

Since the U series uses a proprietary memory module and not a standard SODIMM, if a vendor claims to have U-series RAM for sale and it is a SODIMM, it will not fit in the U series. There are various vendors claiming to sell U-series RAM but the vast majority are selling incompatible DDR SODIMM. There has been no report of modules larger than 512MB as of July 2024.

=== i.Link Firewire port ===
i.Link is Sony's name for IEEE 1394; the port is compatible with 4 pin FireWire cables, and is unpowered. 6 pin firewire cables will need an adapter. The i.Link port on the docking station additionally has a power jack next to the 4 pin jack, used only for Sony compatible CD and DVD drives. Only drives compatible with this extended power jack are capable of booting CDs and DVDs on the U series. Other drives may work once booted into the OS, but will not boot setup CDs or DVDs. There are at least four Sony drives that will work: PCGA-CRWD2, PCGA-DVRW1, PCVA-DRW3, and PCGA-DVD1/A.

(Note that the Sony DRX-510UL drive can be used to read/write discs once Windows has booted, but the red text halfway down the page says specifically, "The DRX-510UL cannot handle [i.e., be used for] system recovery (the reinstallation of the OS).")

== Models ==
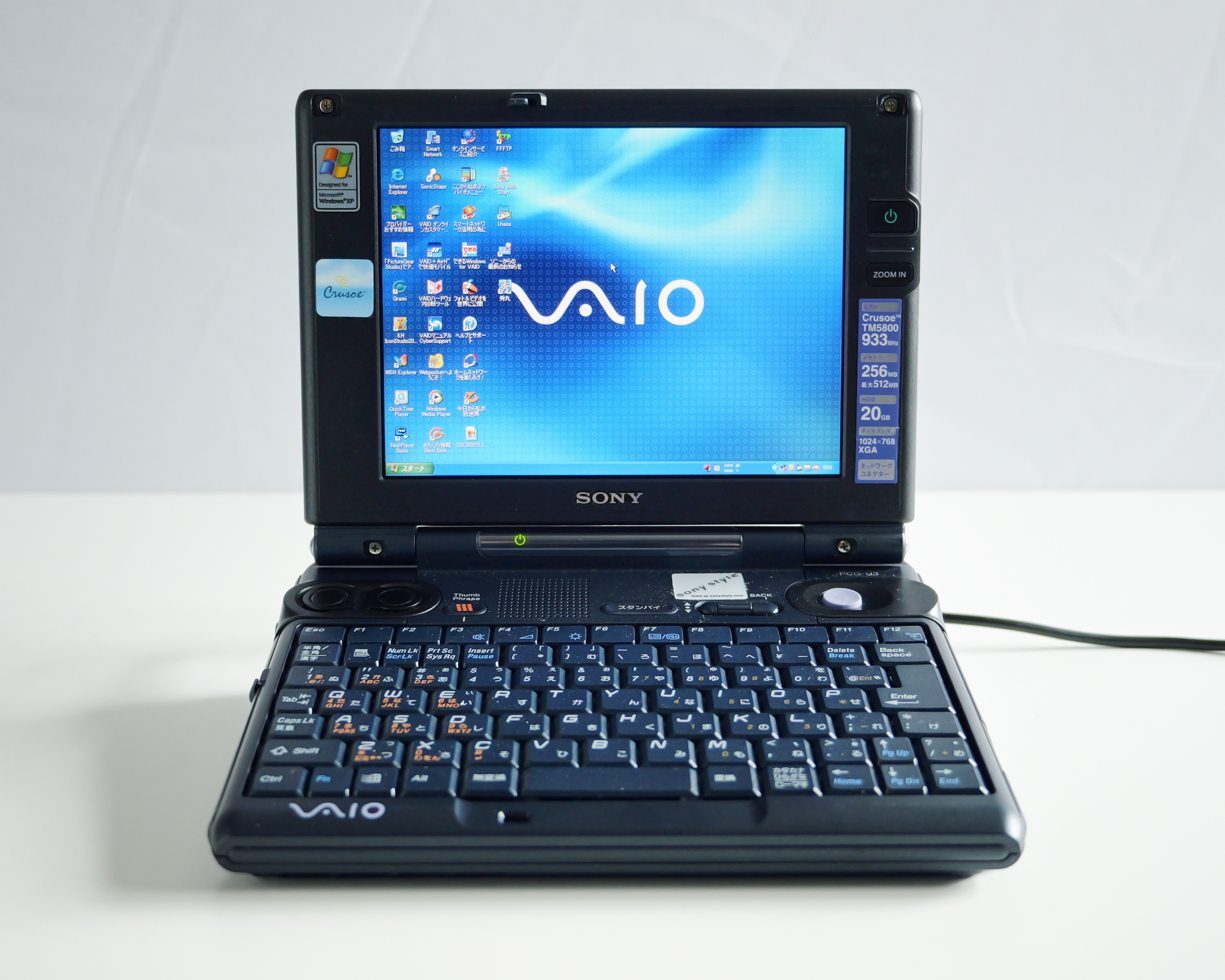
Sony VAIO PCG-U3

The VGN-U70P was produced in 2004 in Japan. It was not available outside Japan, but it was available via import retailers. Only Sony Japan sold the VGN-U70P version directly, while both Sony and other Japanese vendors sold the lower model VGN-U50. A memory upgrade for the U50 is rumored to exist in Japan at an extremely high price.

As of approximately January 2005, Sony Japan had discontinued the U70p, and introduced a new model, VGN-U71P. The upgraded features include a 1.1 GHz CPU with 2 MB of cache, and a 30 GB hard drive.

In December 2004, Sony USA introduced an American model, the VGN-U750P. It is identical to the U71P, but has a 20GB hard drive instead of the 30GB one found in the U71P. It forgoes the Japanese Sony DoVaio media application for an English version of Sony VAIO Media as its media player application. In mid-February 2005, Sony USA's website stopped selling the U750P.

In Hong Kong, Singapore, and a few other south Asian countries, Sony had introduced a regional localized model, the VGN-U8G and VGN-U8C. The U8G is identical to the U50, except it came with an external DVD+/-RW i. Link drive.

== Availability ==
All models of the Sony Vaio U series have been discontinued in lieu of the new UX series.

For a limited time, models U50/U8G/U8C/U70P/U71P/U750P were still available from vendors. As all U models preceding the UX have been discontinued as of 2006, availability of any of the aforementioned U series models on the following websites is either nil, scarce, or sporadic.
