= Sony Vaio UX Micro PC =

Series of Sony computers

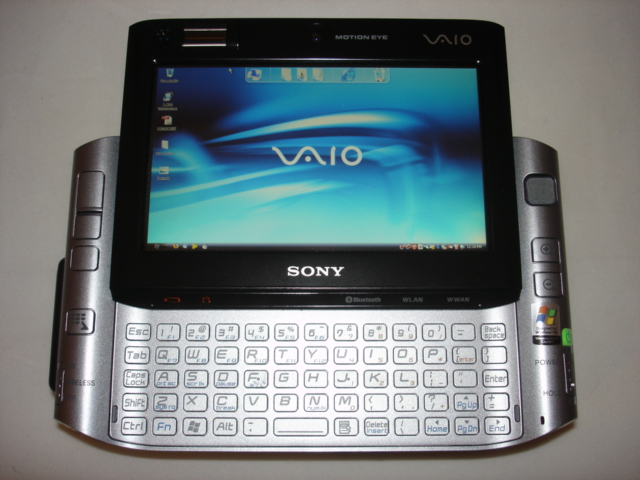
Sony Vaio UX

The Sony Vaio UX Micro PC is an Ultra-Mobile Portable Computer (UMPC) first marketed in 2006. It weighs around 490–544 g (1.20–1.27 lb), and has a slide-out QWERTY keyboard, touchscreen, Intel Core 2 Solo processor, Bluetooth, Wi-Fi, and WWAN. Though not officially stated as such, and even to a point implied by Sony that the UX is a move in a new direction and not a specific continuation of such, the Sony UX is speculated by some to be the newest model in the popular Sony U-series.

NOTE : Japanese models include 533 MHz memory and so do the minority markets ( Europe, Australia etc. ) models. The US ones do not have 533 MHz but slower 400 MHz.

All models share these features:

- 4.5" XBrite TFT LCD touchscreen with 1024x600 display resolution.
- Intel Graphics Media Accelerator 950 Graphics Card (128 MB (128 MB) Shared RAM) - some have 256 MB
- Memory Stick Duo Slot
- Built-in Wi-Fi 802.11b/g and Bluetooth
- Fingerprint reader
- Front and back digital cameras

Model	Processor	RAM	Storage Capacity	OS	Connectivity	Market & Colour
VGN-UX50	Intel Core Solo U1300 1.06 GHz	512 MB (512 MB)	30 GB	Windows XP Home	CompactFlash slot	Japanese market model, Silver
VGN-UX50/80 GB	Intel Core Solo U1300 1.06 GHz	512 MB	80 GB	Windows XP Home	CompactFlash slot	Japanese market model, Silver
VGN-UX90S	Intel Core Solo U1400 1.2 GHz	512 MB	30 GB	Windows XP Home	CompactFlash slot	Japanese market model, Silver
VGN-UX90S	Intel Core Solo U1400 1.2 GHz	1 GB (1 GB)	40 GB	Windows XP Home	CompactFlash slot	Japanese market model, Silver
VGN-UX90S	Intel Core Solo U1400 1.2 GHz	1 GB	80 GB	Windows XP Home	CompactFlash slot	Japanese market model, Silver
VGN-UX91S	Intel Core Solo U1400 1.2 GHz	1 GB	80 GB	Windows XP Home	CompactFlash slot	Japanese market model, Black
VGN-UX92	Intel Core 2 Solo U2200 1.2 GHz	1 GB	100 GB	Windows XP Home	CompactFlash slot	Japanese market model, Silver
VGN-UX90SSD	Intel Core Solo U1400 1.2 GHz	512 MB	16 GB Solid State	Windows XP Home	CompactFlash slot	Japanese market model, Silver
VGN-UX91S	Intel Core Solo U1500 1.33 GHz	1 GB	32 GB Solid State	Windows Vista	CompactFlash slot	Japanese market model, Silver
VGN-UX92SSD	Intel Core 2 Solo U2200 1.2 GHz	1 GB	64 GB Solid State	Windows XP Home	CompactFlash slot	Japanese market model, Silver
VGN-UX180P	Intel Core Solo U1400 1.2 GHz	512 MB	30 GB	Windows XP Pro	Cingular EDGE	US market model, Silver
VGN-UX230P	Intel Core Solo U1200 1.06 GHz	512 MB	30 GB	Windows XP Pro	Cingular EDGE	US market model, Silver
VGN-UX280P	Intel Core Solo U1400 1.2 GHz	1 GB	40 GB	Windows XP Pro	Cingular EDGE	US market model, Silver
VGN-UX280P	Intel Core Solo U1400 1.2 GHz	1 GB	80 GB	Windows XP Pro	Cingular EDGE	US market model, Silver
VGN-UX380N	Intel Core Solo U1500 1.33 GHz	1 GB	40 GB	Windows Vista	Cingular EDGE	US market model, Silver
VGN-UX390N	Intel Core Solo U1500 1.33 GHz	1 GB	32 GB Solid State	Windows Vista	Cingular EDGE	US market model, Black
VGN-UX490N	Intel Core 2 Solo U2200 1.2 GHz	1 GB	48 GB Solid State	Windows Vista	Cingular EDGE	US market model, Black
VGN-UX1XN	Intel Core Solo U1500 1.33 GHz	1 GB	32 GB Solid State	Windows Vista	CompactFlash slot	European market model, Black
VGN-UX17GP	Intel Core Solo U1400 1.2 GHz	512 MB	30 GB	Windows XP Pro	CompactFlash slot	Australian market model, Silver
VGN-UX17TP	Intel Core Solo U1400 1.2 GHz	512 MB	30 GB	Windows XP Pro	CompactFlash slot	Taiwanese market model, Silver
VGN-UX18C	Intel Core Solo U1400 1.2 GHz	512 MB	16 GB Solid State	Windows XP Home	CompactFlash slot	Chinese market model, Black
VGN-UX27TN	Intel Core Solo U1500 1.33 GHz	1 GB	40 GB	Windows Vista	CompactFlash slot	Taiwanese market model, Silver
VGN-UX27GN	Intel Core Solo U1500 1.33 GHz	1 GB	40 GB	Windows Vista	CompactFlash slot	Hong Kong market model, Silver
VGN-UX38GN	Intel Core Solo U1500 1.33 GHz	1 GB	32 GB Solid State	Windows Vista	CompactFlash slot	Hong Kong market model, Black
VGN-UX58GN	Intel Core 2 Solo U2200 1.20 GHz	1 GB	48 GB Solid State	Windows Vista	CompactFlash slot	Hong Kong market model, Blue
