= PlayStation Mobile =

Software framework developed by Sony

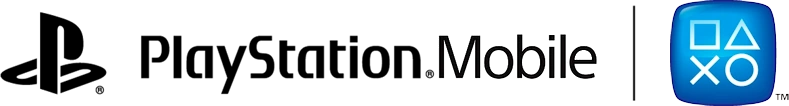
- Developer: Sony Computer Entertainment
- Release: October 3, 2012; 14 years ago
- Final release: 2.01 / 2015; 11 years ago
- Operating system: Android (version 1.xx only), PlayStation Vita, PlayStation TV
- Website: www.playstation.com/psm

PlayStation Mobile was a software framework used to provide downloadable PlayStation content for select "Certified" mobile devices. This includes devices that both run Android 2.3 and met specific hardware requirements, PlayStation Vita, and PlayStation TV. It was active from 2012 to 2015.

It was originally announced in 2011 as PlayStation Suite. It was based on the Mono platform. An open beta was released in April 2012 before it officially launched in most regions of the world on October 3, 2012. In May 2013, Sony announced that the publisher license fee would be waived in an attempt to entice more developers to create games for the service. In August 2014 with version 2.00, Sony announced that it will deprecate support for Android and target only PlayStation Vita and PlayStation TV. It was announced in 2015 that PlayStation Mobile will be shutting down entirely. The service never gained traction despite availability on a range of handsets by many manufacturers. The storefront was closed in July 2015, with the service completely shutting down on September 10, 2015.

== Games ==
The games released under PlayStation Mobile were available to devices via the PlayStation Store, allowing players to download the titles to their devices. Games released under the program could have the DualShock controls overlaid on top of the touchscreen, however for devices which have analog buttons such as the PlayStation Vita and Xperia Play, the controls were mapped directly to them. Developers could also make purely touch screen games, if they so choose.

At E3 2012, Sony announced that PlayStation Mobile had 56 established software houses committed to providing content on the platform.

There were 683 games available on the service.

== PlayStation Certified ==
Official logo for PlayStation Certified

To ensure that Android devices run PlayStation Mobile content correctly, Sony created a set of guidelines and requirements for hardware known as PlayStation Certified. The first certified device was Sony Ericsson Xperia Play. The PlayStation Vita and PlayStation TV also had access to PlayStation Mobile. In a November 2011 update, the previously released Sony Ericsson Xperia Arc, and Sony Ericsson Xperia acro became PlayStation Certified. The Sony Xperia S, Sony Xperia ion and Sony Tablets were also PlayStation Certified.

HTC was the first non-Sony manufacturing company revealed to offer PlayStation Certified devices. The HTC One series handsets were supported, noted models include HTC One X, HTC One S, HTC One V, HTC One XL, HTC One X+ and the HTC Evo 4G LTE . At Sony's 2012 Gamescom press conference, it was revealed that the WikiPad gaming tablet would also be PlayStation Certified and that ASUS would also create certified hardware. At Sony's Tokyo Game Show 2012 press conference, Fujitsu and Sharp were announced as two more partners.

A full list of PlayStation Certified devices could be found at PlayStation Mobile download page but has since been removed.

== Legacy ==
Following the shut down of PlayStation Mobile, Sony launched a new subsidiary called ForwardWorks in 2016. It provided mobile games to users in Japan and the rest of Asia.
