= A350 (disambiguation) =

A350 usually refers to the Airbus A350, a long-range widebody airliner created by Airbus.

A350 may also refer to:

- Airbus A330neo, originally designated A350
- Alpine A350, a Formula One race car designed for Alpine in 1968
- A350 road (England), a north–south primary route in southern England
- ABM-1 Galosh or A-350 missile, a nuclear tipped anti-ballistic missile used in the former Soviet Union
- Fujifilm FinePix A350, a basic digital point and shoot camera
- DSLR-A350 a.k.a. Sony α350, a digital SLR with A-mount in the Sony Alpha camera system
