= A210 =

A210 may refer to:

- A210 road, a road in South East London in the UK
- Alpine A210, a sports car prototype manufactured by Alpine that competed in sports car racing from 1966 to 1969
- Aquila A210, a two-seat reinforced plastic light aircraft produced in Germany from 2002
- Bundesautobahn 210, a motorway in Germany also known as the A210
- FinePix A210, a digital camera produced by Fujifilm
