= Fujifilm FinePix J series =

Digital camera

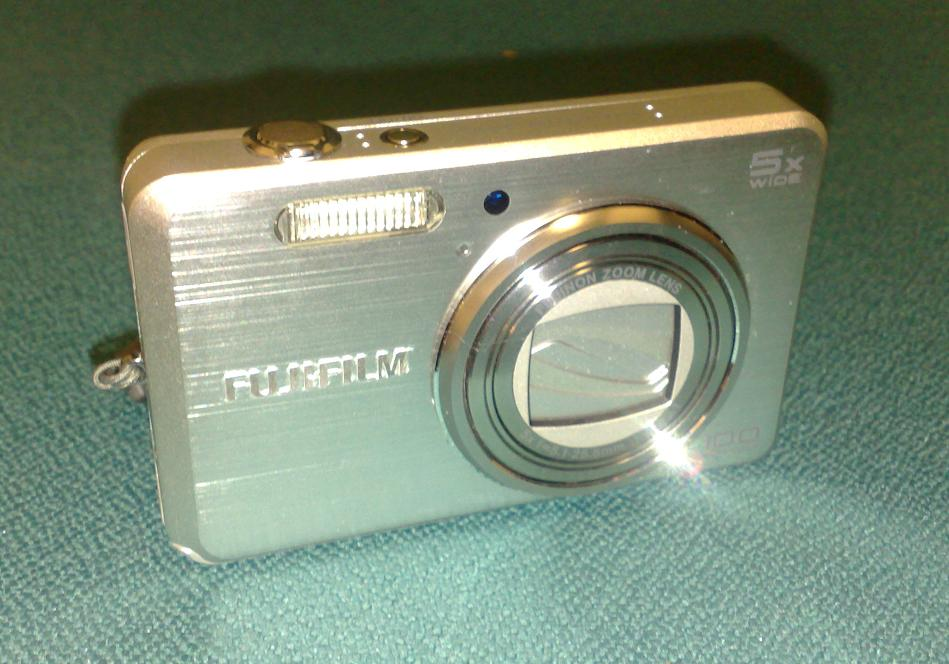
Fujifilm FinePix J150W

The Fujifilm FinePix J series of digital cameras consists of the later models of the company's entry-level point and shoot digital cameras. The J series is a partial replacement range for the A series range.

The first J-series model released was the 8.2-megapixel J10, which was released in early 2008. As of February 2009, there are eight different models in the J-series range, from the J10 up to and including the J150W. All models in the range are powered by lithium ion rechargeable batteries.

All J-series cameras have the standard CCD sensors. The first few models, the J10, J12 and the J50 use the xD-Picture Card flash memory format, whilst the later models use SD/SDHC flash memory format, these include the J100, J110W, J120 and the J150W. The J15fd uses both flash memory formats.

== Models ==
- J10 (discontinued)
- J12
- J15fd (discontinued)
- J20 (discontinued)
- J26
- J27
- J30
- J32
- J35
- J37 (discontinued)
- J38
- J40
- J50 (discontinued)
- J100 (discontinued)
- J110w (discontinued)
- J120 (discontinued)
- J150w (discontinued)
- JX200
- J250 (discontinued)
- JV250
- JZ200
- JZ210
- JZ250
- JZ100
- JX300
- JX350
- JX370
- JX400
- JX580
- JX550
- JX520
- JX500
- JX550
- JX560
- JX680

== See also ==
- Fujifilm FinePix
- Fujifilm cameras
- Fujifilm
