= A610 =

A610 may refer to:

- Renault Alpine GTA/A610, an automobile produced by the Renault-owned French manufacturer Alpine
- A610 road (England), a road connecting Nottingham and Ambergate
- Quebec Autoroute 610, a short spur road located in Sherbrooke, Quebec
- Powershot a610, a Canon digital camera
- FinePix A610, a Fuji digital camera
