= A345 =

A345 may refer to:

- A345 road (England), a secondary A road in Wiltshire connecting Salisbury and Marlborough
- Airbus A340-500
- Fujifilm FinePix A345, a basic point-and-shoot camera
- RFA Tarbatness (A345), a 1967 Royal Fleet Auxiliary fleet stores ship
