= A850 =

A850 may refer to:

- Sony Alpha 850, Sony's second full-frame digital SLR, introduced on 27 August 2009
- A850 road, one of the principal roads of the Isle of Skye in the Inner Hebrides off the west coast of mainland Scotland
- Fujifilm FinePix A series, Fujifilm FinePix entry-level point and shoot models
