= Fujifilm FinePix Z-series =

Type of digital camera

The Fujifilm FinePix Z-series of digital cameras consists of the company's ultra-slim and lightweight point-and-shoot digital cameras. All Z-series cameras feature non-protruding folded optic design lenses and sliding lens covers, excluding the waterproof Z33WP, which has no lens cover. The early Z-series cameras featured Fujifilm's Super CCD sensor, while later ones use other CCD sensors. Some newer models such as the Z700EXR, Z800EXR, Z900EXR, Z950EXR, Z1000EXR and Z2000EXR, use the EXR-CMOS sensors.

== Models ==
2011+2012 models

- FinePix Z2000EXR
- FinePix Z1000EXR
- FinePix Z950EXR
- FinePix Z110
- FinePix Z90

Earlier models

- FinePix Z1
- FinePix Z2
- FinePix Z3
- FinePix Z5fd
- FinePix Z100fd
- FinePix Z200fd
- FinePix Z300
- FinePix Z10fd
- FinePix Z20fd
- FinePix Z33WP
- FinePix Z30
- FinePix Z35
- FinePix Z37
- FinePix Z70
- FinePix Z700EXR
- FinePix Z80
- FinePix Z800EXR
- FinePix Z900EXR

== See also ==
- Fujifilm FinePix
- Fujifilm cameras
- Fujifilm
