= Fujifilm FinePix XP-series =

Brand of rugged compact digital cameras

The Fujifilm FinePix XP-series of digital cameras consists of the company's tough, waterproof and lightweight point-and-shoot digital cameras. All XP-series cameras feature some degree of waterproofing and shockproofing which varies from model to model. The range began in 2009 with the launch of the Fujifilm FinePix XP10. A few of the models (FinePix XP150, FinePix XP140, and FinePix XP30) also incorporate in-built GPS tagging.

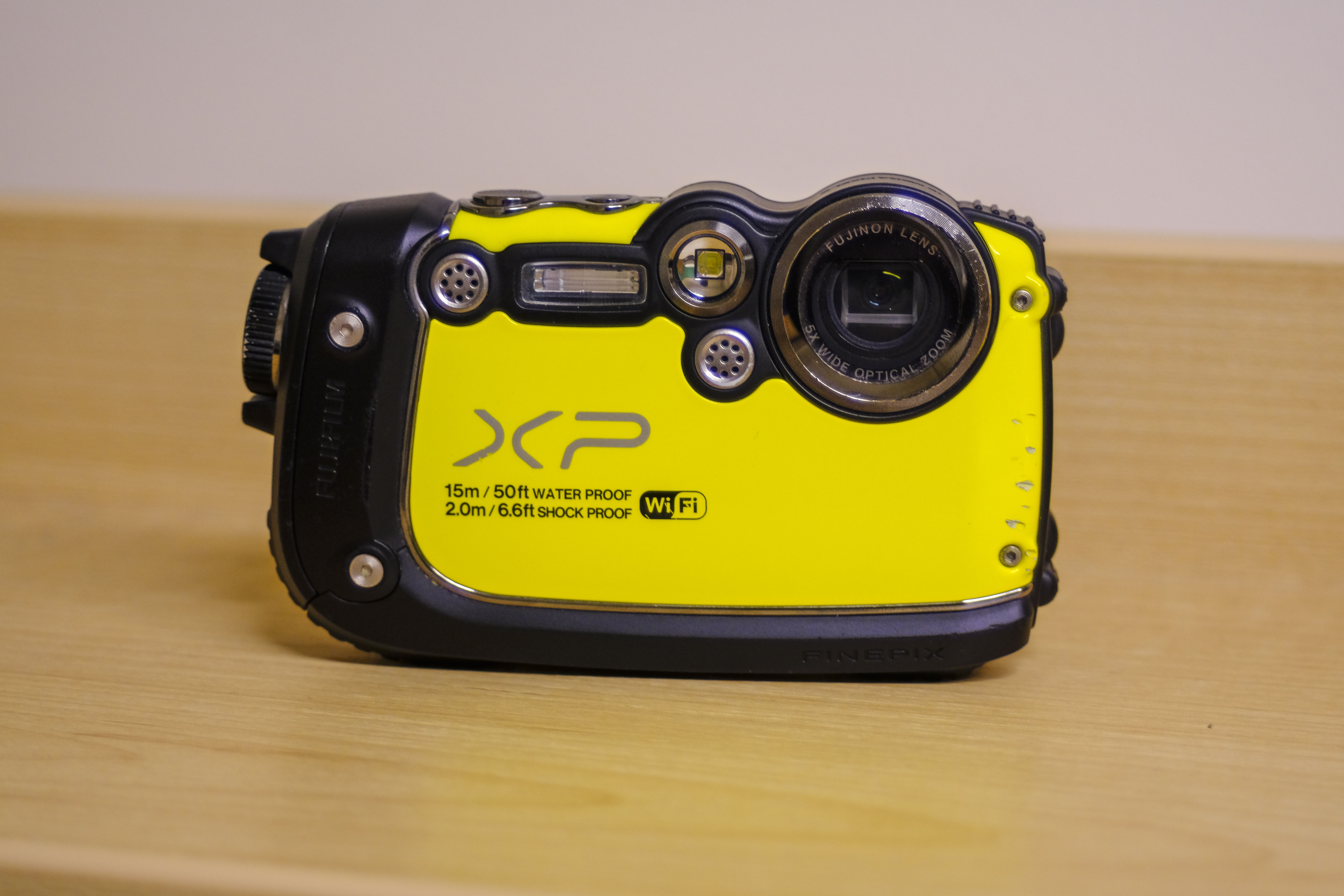
A Fujiflm FinePix XP200

Some online reviews claim the XP series has inferior image quality, an easy to scratch screen, and inadequate water-proofing. However, other reviews praise the XP series for their rugged construction, photo quality, and waterproofing.

== Models ==
=== Current ===
As of January 2021, FujiFilm offers a single XP model in the US market.

- FinePix XP140 - 25 metres (82 ft) waterproof, shockproof from 1.8 metres (5.9 ft), sandproof, Freezeproof to −10 °C (14 °F), wireless image transfer via smartphone app, in-camera GPS tagging, 16MP 1/2.3-inch BSI-CMOS image sensor with optical image stabilization, 5x optical zoom (28-140mm), burst mode button, 4K movie and full HD movie (1080p) linear PCM duophonic, slow-mo video, ISO range up to ISO 12800

=== Discontinued ===
- FinePix XP200 - 15 metres (49 ft) waterproof, shockproof from 2 metres (6 ft 7 in), sandproof, freezeproof to −10 °C (14 °F), wireless image transfer via smartphone app, in-camera GPS tagging, 16MP CMOS image sensor with optical image stabilization, 5x optical zoom (28-140mm), burst mode button (10 FPS at 16MP, 60FPS at 2MP), full HD movie (1080i/60fps) linear PCM sound, slow-mo video available in standard definition (480p video at 120fps, 168p video at 360fps), ISO range up to ISO 6400
- FinePix XP170 - 10 metres (33 ft) waterproof, shockproof from 2 metres (6 ft 7 in), sandproof, freezeproof to −10 °C (14 °F), double locking battery compartment, in-camera GPS tagging, wireless photo transfers, 14MP CMOS shift image stabilization, 5x optical zoom (28-140mm), 10fps, full HD 30p with monoaural sound and can take video while zooming
- FinePix XP150 - 10 metres (33 ft) waterproof, shockproof from 2 metres (6 ft 7 in), sandproof, freezeproof to −10 °C (14 °F), double locking battery compartment, in-camera GPS tagging
- FinePix XP130 - 20 metres (66 ft) waterproof, shockproof from 1.75 metres (5.7 ft), sandproof, freezeproof to −10 °C (14 °F), double locking battery compartment, 16MP CMOS image sensor
- FinePix XP120
- FinePix XP100 - 10 metres (33 ft) waterproof, shockproof from 2 metres (6 ft 7 in), sandproof, freezeproof to −10 °C (14 °F), double locking battery compartment
- FinePix XP80 - 15 metres (49 ft) waterproof, shockproof from 1.75 metres (5.7 ft)
- FinePix XP75 - 10 metres (33 ft) waterproof, shockproof from 1.5 metres (4.9 ft), sandproof, freezeproof to −10 °C (14 °F), double locking battery compartment, 16MP CMOS image sensor
- FinePix XP70
- FinePix XP60 - 16MP, waterproof down to 6 m (20 ft), has a 5x optical zoom lens, image stabilization and can record 1080i60 video. A dedicated 'burst mode' button offers up to 10fps at full resolution. The camera also comes with a sweep panorama mode as well as several effects filters.
- FinePix XP50 - 14MP, waterproof to5 metres (16 ft), shockproof from 1.5 metres (4.9 ft), sandproof, freezeproof to −10 °C (14 °F), double locking battery compartment
- FinePix XP55 - 5 metres (16 ft) waterproof, shockproof from 1.5 metres (4.9 ft), sandproof, freezeproof to −10 °C (14 °F), double locking battery compartment
- FinePix XP30 - 5 metres (16 ft) waterproof, shockproof from 1.5 metres (4.9 ft), sandproof, freezeproof to −10 °C (14 °F), in-camera GPS
- FinePix XP20 - 5 metres (16 ft) waterproof, shockproof from 1.5 metres (4.9 ft), sandproof, freezeproof to −10 °C (14 °F)
- FinePix XP10 - 3 metres (9.8 ft) waterproof, shockproof from 1 metre (3.3 ft), sandproof, freezeproof to −10 °C (14 °F)

== See also ==
- Fujifilm cameras
