= Fujifilm FinePix Z33WP =

2009 digital compact camera

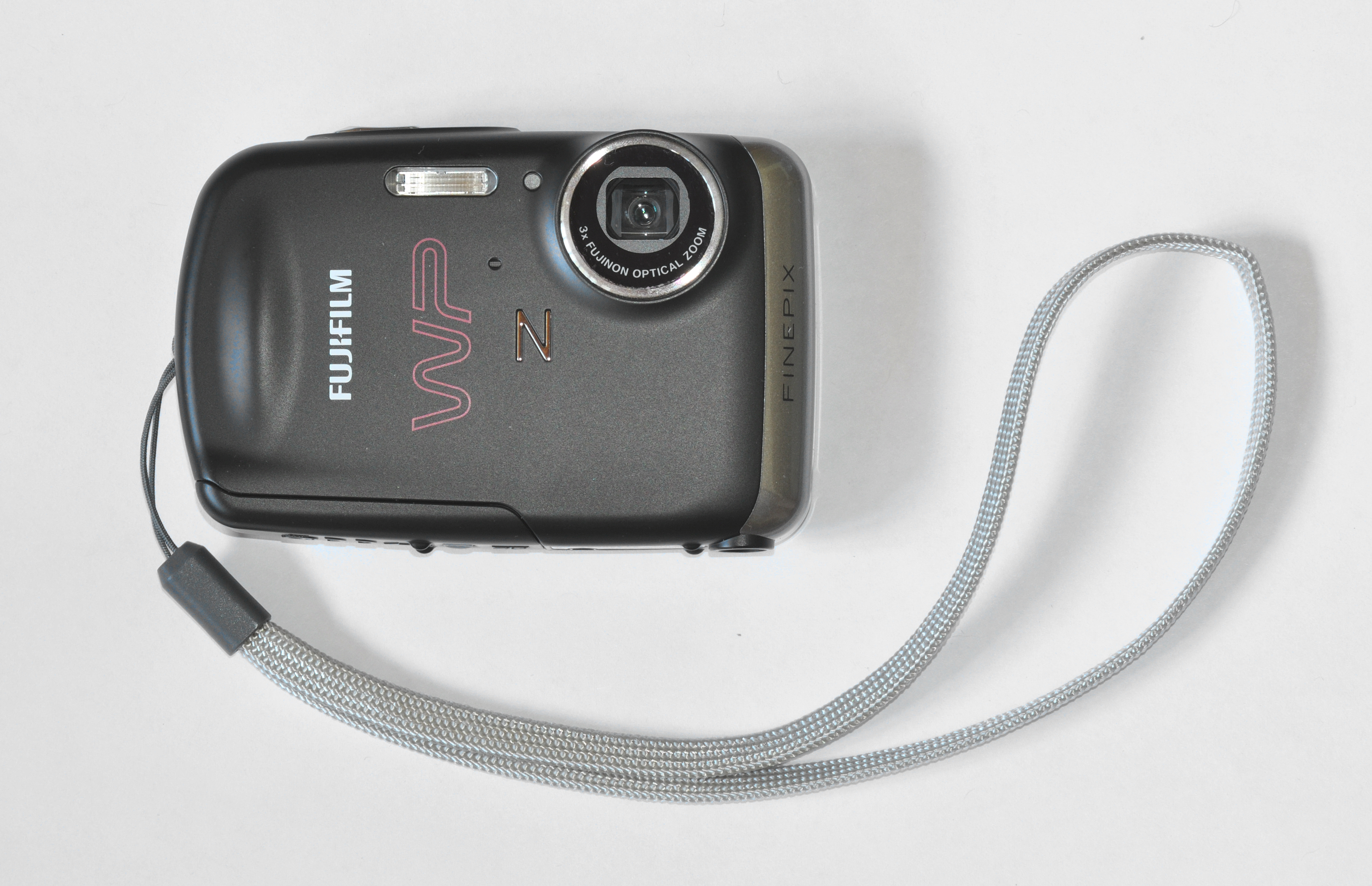

Overview
- Maker: Fujifilm Holdings Corporation
- Type: Digital camera

Lens
- Lens: 6.3 – 18.9mm (35 – 105mm equivalent in 35mm photography, 3x zoom ratio, F3.7 - F4.2

Sensor/medium
- Sensor: 1/2.5” CCD
- Maximum resolution: 10 megapixels
- Film speed: Auto, 64, 100, 200, 400, 800, 1600
- Storage media: 50MB Internal Memory; SD memory card SDHC memory card

Flash
- Flash: Built-in

Shutter
- Shutter speed range: 3 – 1/1,000 sec.

General
- LCD screen: 2.7" TFT LCD, 230,000 pixels, live preview capable
- Battery: NP-45 Li-ion battery

The Fujifilm FinePix Z33WP is a waterproof digital camera produced by Fujifilm and introduced in July 2009 after being announced on February 17, 2009.
