= Fujifilm FinePix =

Line of digital cameras

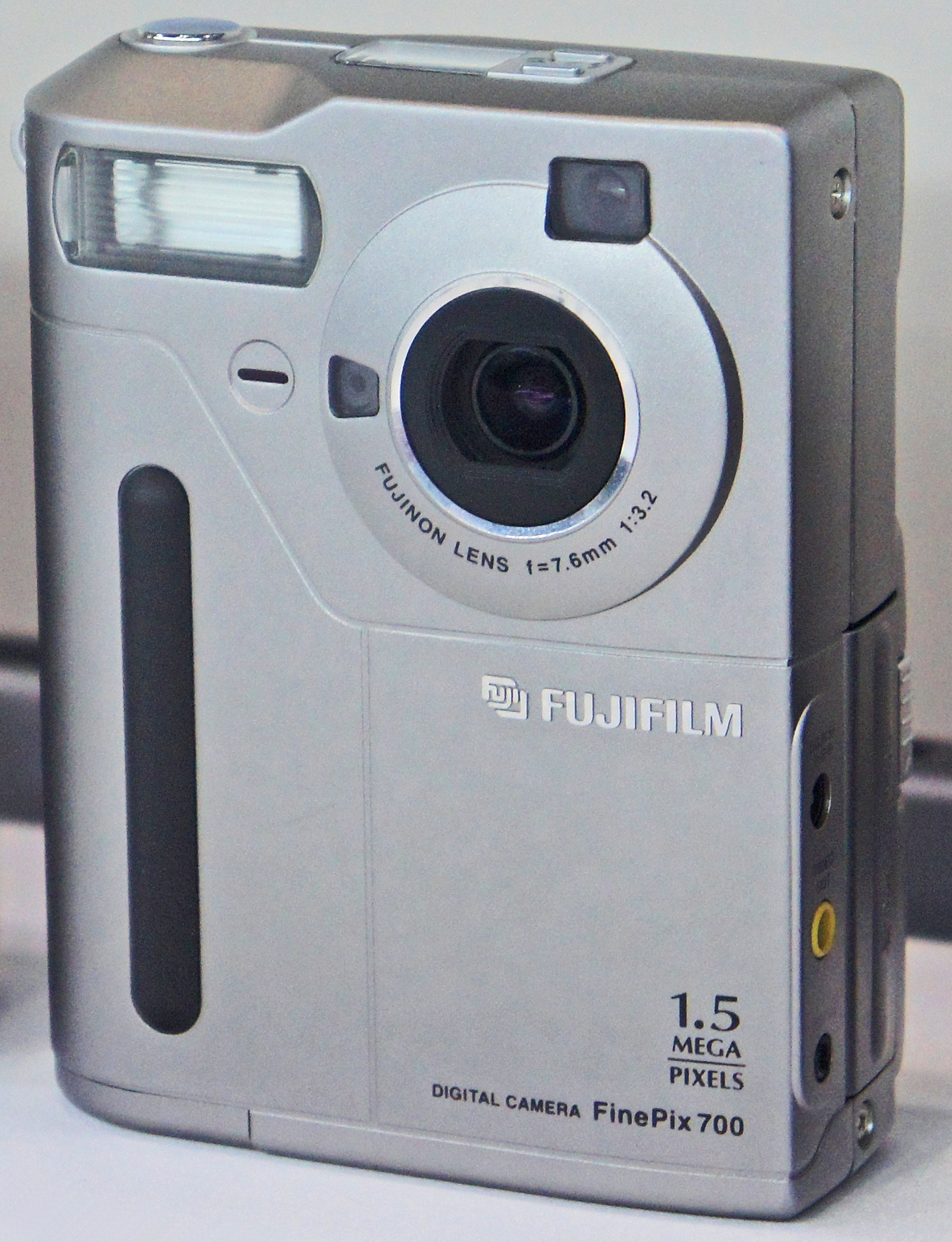
Fujifilm FinePix MX-700, the first camera of the FinePix series, released in 1998.

The Fujifilm FinePix products are a line of digital cameras produced by Fujifilm. They include compact point and shoot models, tough, waterproof models, bridge digital cameras, digital SLRs and mirrorless cameras. Many use Fujifilm's proprietary Super CCD technology sensors and CMOS sensors for high-end models.

The range is no longer readily used by Fujifilm.

== Model series ==
=== Current series ===
- XP series: Tough, waterproof, shockproof, dustproof and freezeproof series introduced in 2009.
- X100: The Fujifilm Finepix X100 announced at Photokina 2010, and was subsequently introduced in February 2011. Originally the X100 did not belong to the X series, but later the model range was integrated. Later X series models are not a part of the Finepix series, which is all but no longer used by Fujifilm.

=== Discontinued series ===
- F series: Travel Long Zoom compact models.
- J series: entry-level compact series introduced in 2008.
- S series: Bridge digital camera ultra-zoom series (including SL Series) with CCD or CMOS sensor.
- HS series: Bridge digital camera ultra-zoom series with CMOS sensors, better than S series.
- T series: Stylist Zoom, Compact models with powerful zoom.
- Z series: Ultra-compact series introduced in 2005.
- Real 3D series: Known also as W Series Stereoscopic cameras introduced in 2009.
- A series: Entry-level point and shoot models, introduced in 2001.
- E series: These include the E500, E510, E550 from 2003 - 2004.
- M-series: Including the M603.
- PR21: Included a built in Instax instant film printer
- V series: And a rare V10 in early 2006.
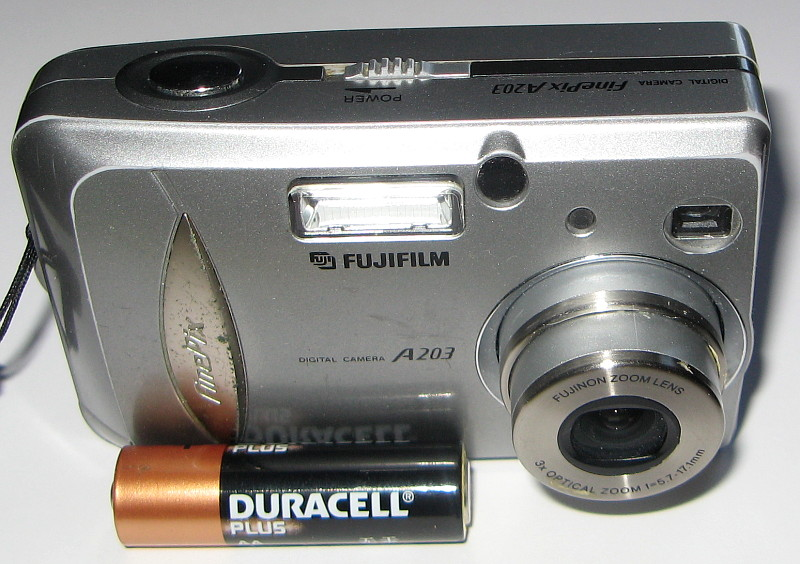
Fujifilm Finepix A203 (2002)

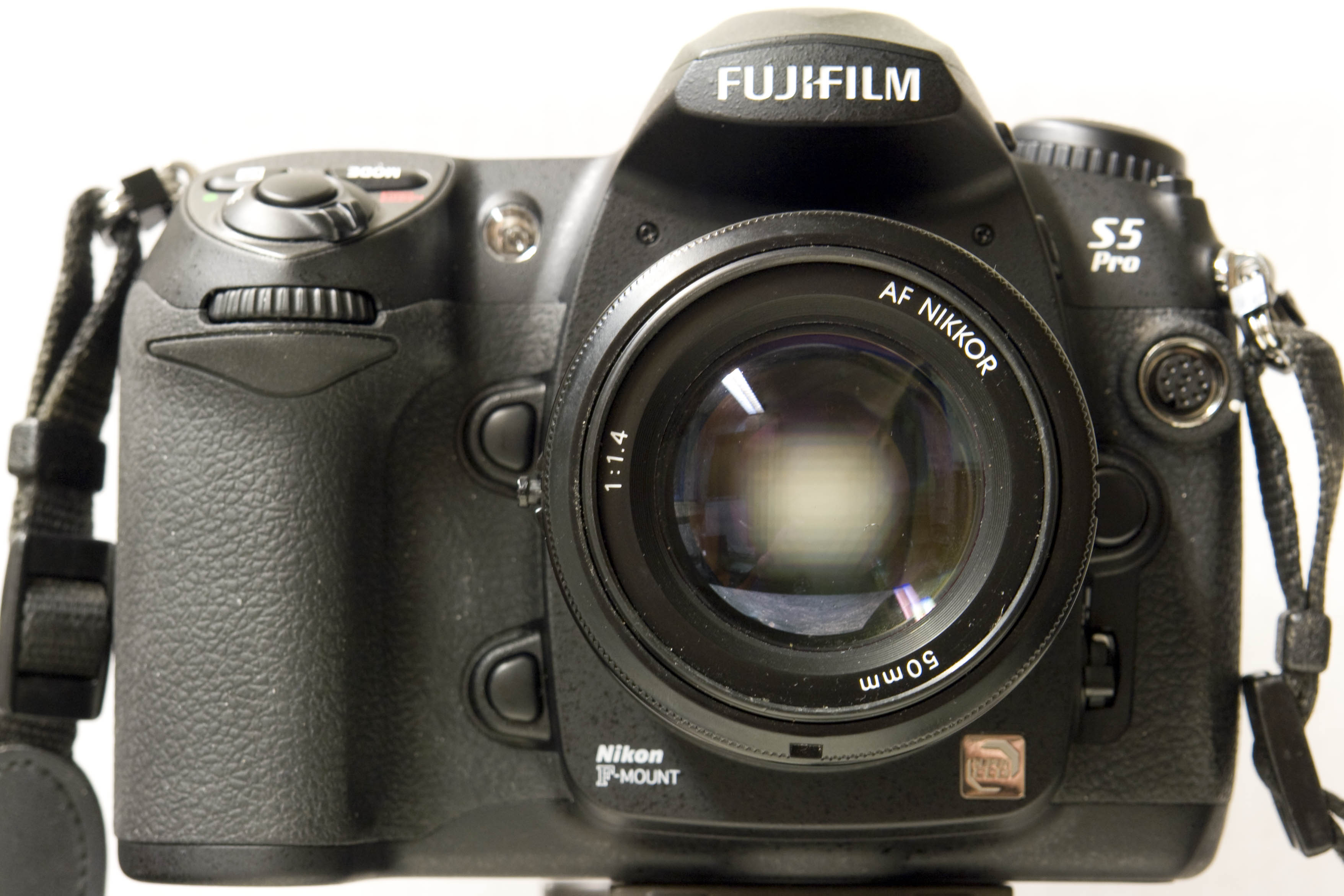
Fujifilm FinePix S5 Pro (2006)

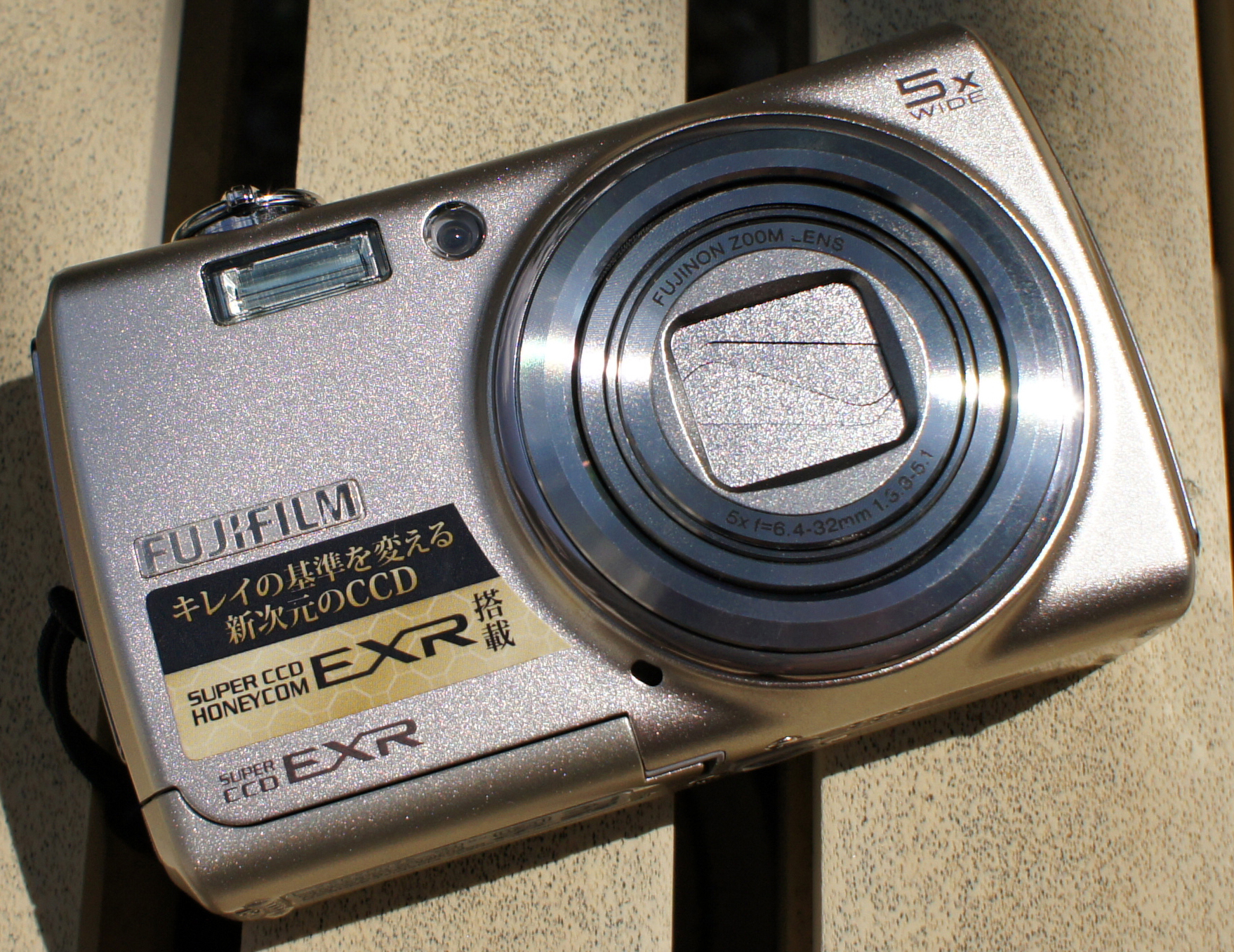
Fujifilm FinePix F200EXR (2009)

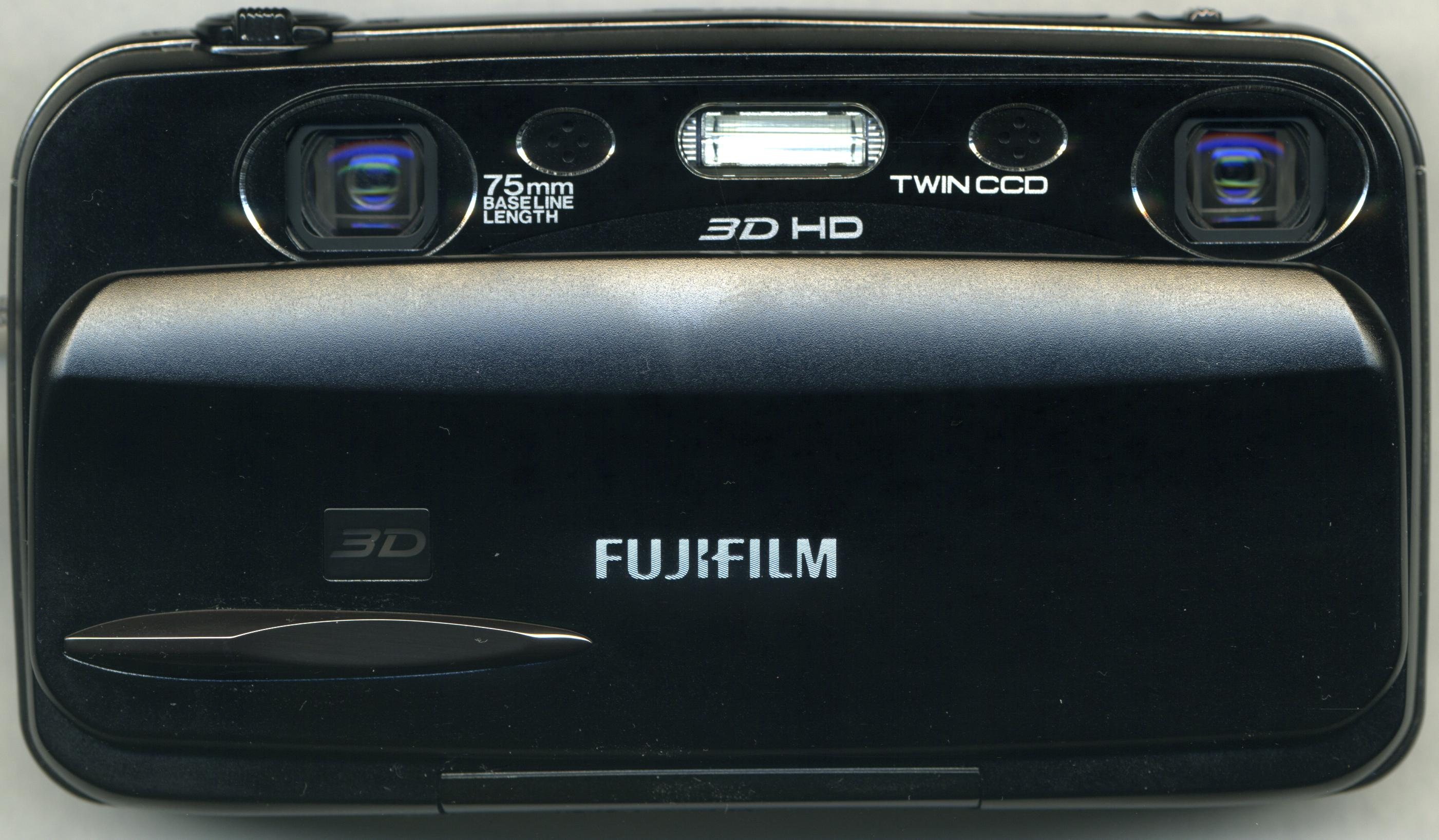
Fujifilm FinePix Real 3D W1 (2009)

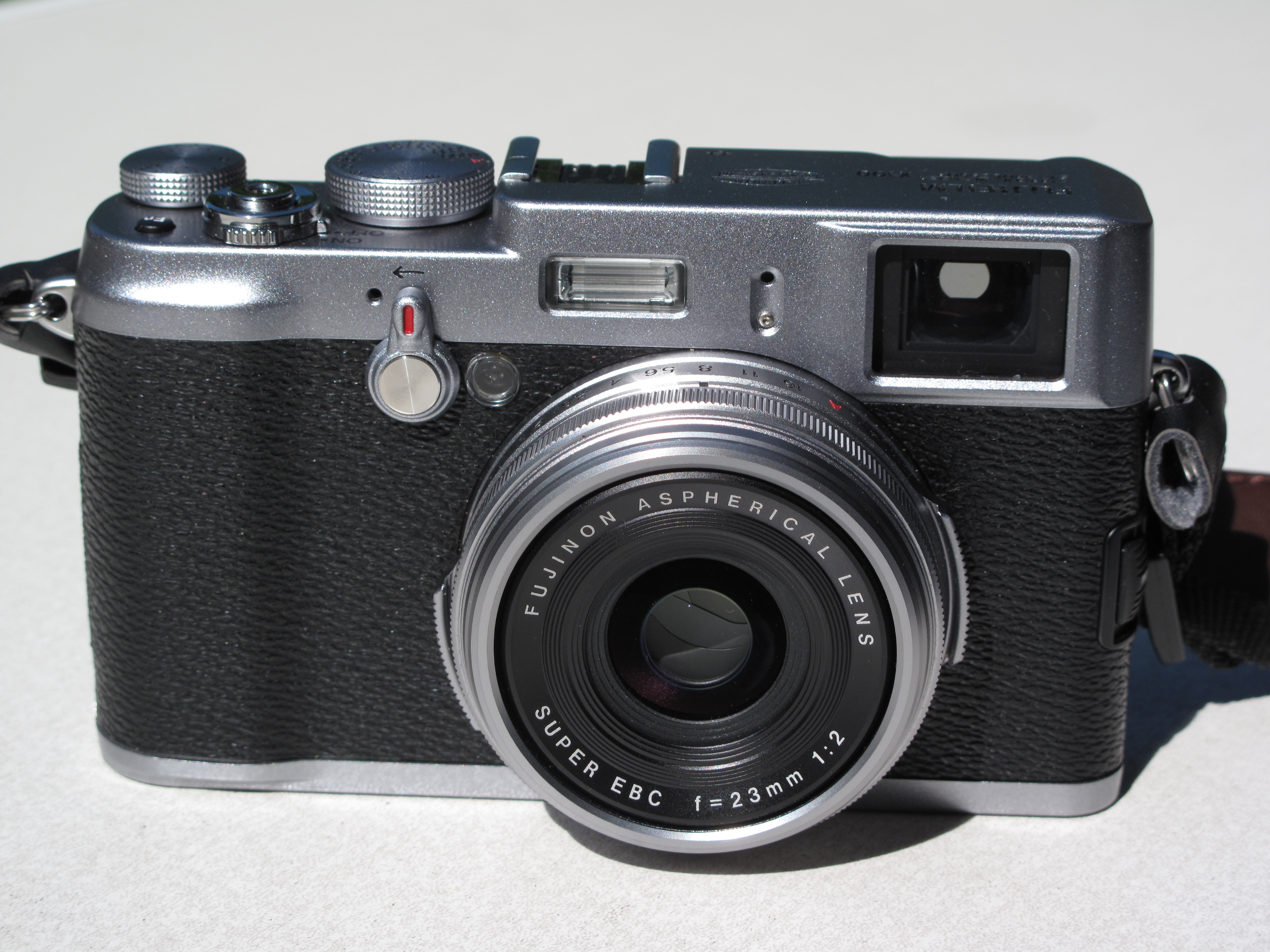
Fujifilm FinePix X100 (2011)

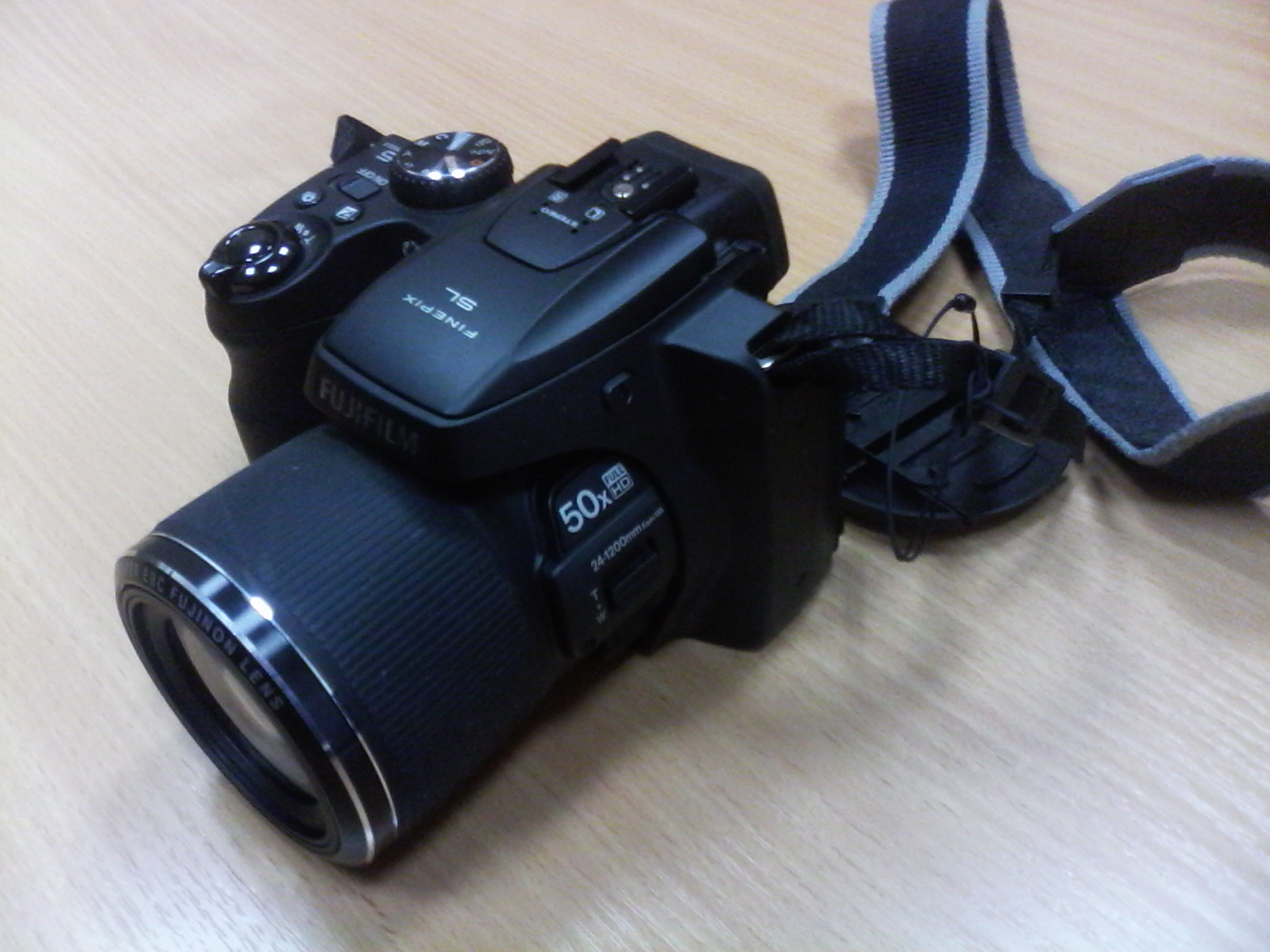
Fujifilm FinePix SL 1000 (2014)

== See also ==
- Digital photography
- Stereo camera
- Flash (photography)

| Family | Level | Sensor | 1998 | 1999 | 2000 | 2001 | 2002 | 2003 | 2004 | 2005 | 2006 | 2007 | 2008 | 2009 | 2010 |
| Fujix | Professional | 2/3 inch | | DS-565 | | | | | | | | | | | |
| Fujix | Professional | 2/3 inch | | DS-560 | | | | | | | | | | | |
| FinePix | Industrial | APS-C | | | | | | | | | | S3 Pro UVIR | IS Pro | | |
| FinePix | Advanced | APS-C | | | S1 Pro | | S2 Pro | | S3 Pro | | | S5 Pro | | | |
