= FUJIFILM VisualSonics =

FUJIFILM VisualSonics Inc. (originally VisualSonics Inc.) is a biomedical company focused on the commercialization of high-frequency ultrasound and photoacoustic imaging equipment for research purposes. The company is headquartered in Toronto, Canada (with European headquarters in Amsterdam).

== History ==
VisualSonics was founded in 1999 by Stuart Foster, Medical Physicist out of Sunnybrook Research Institute, Toronto. Dr. Foster's laboratory had been focused on developing a higher frequency ultrasound system since 1983 in order to better study mouse models of human disease. In 2010 the company was acquired by the American clinical ultrasound company, SonoSite Inc. (based in Bothell, WA). In 2012, FUJIFILM Holdings acquired SonoSite Inc.
