= Fujifilm FinePix A series =

Digital camera product line

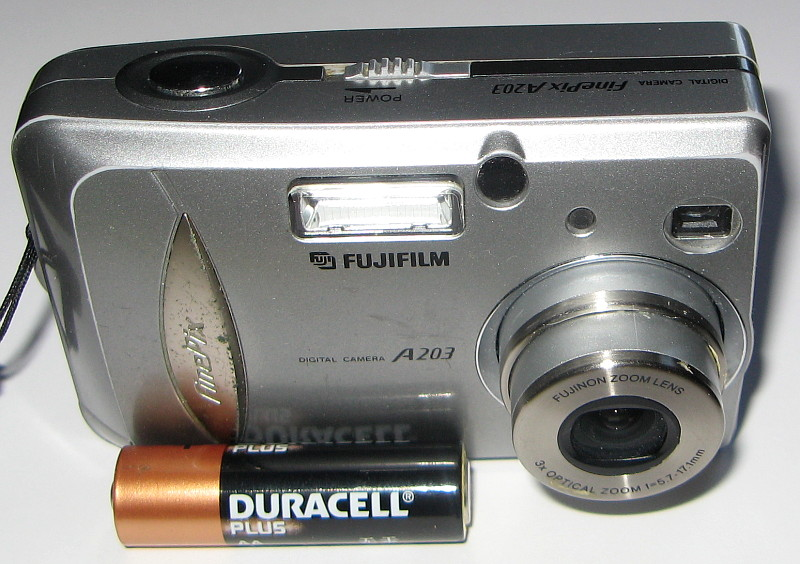
Fujifilm FinePix A203

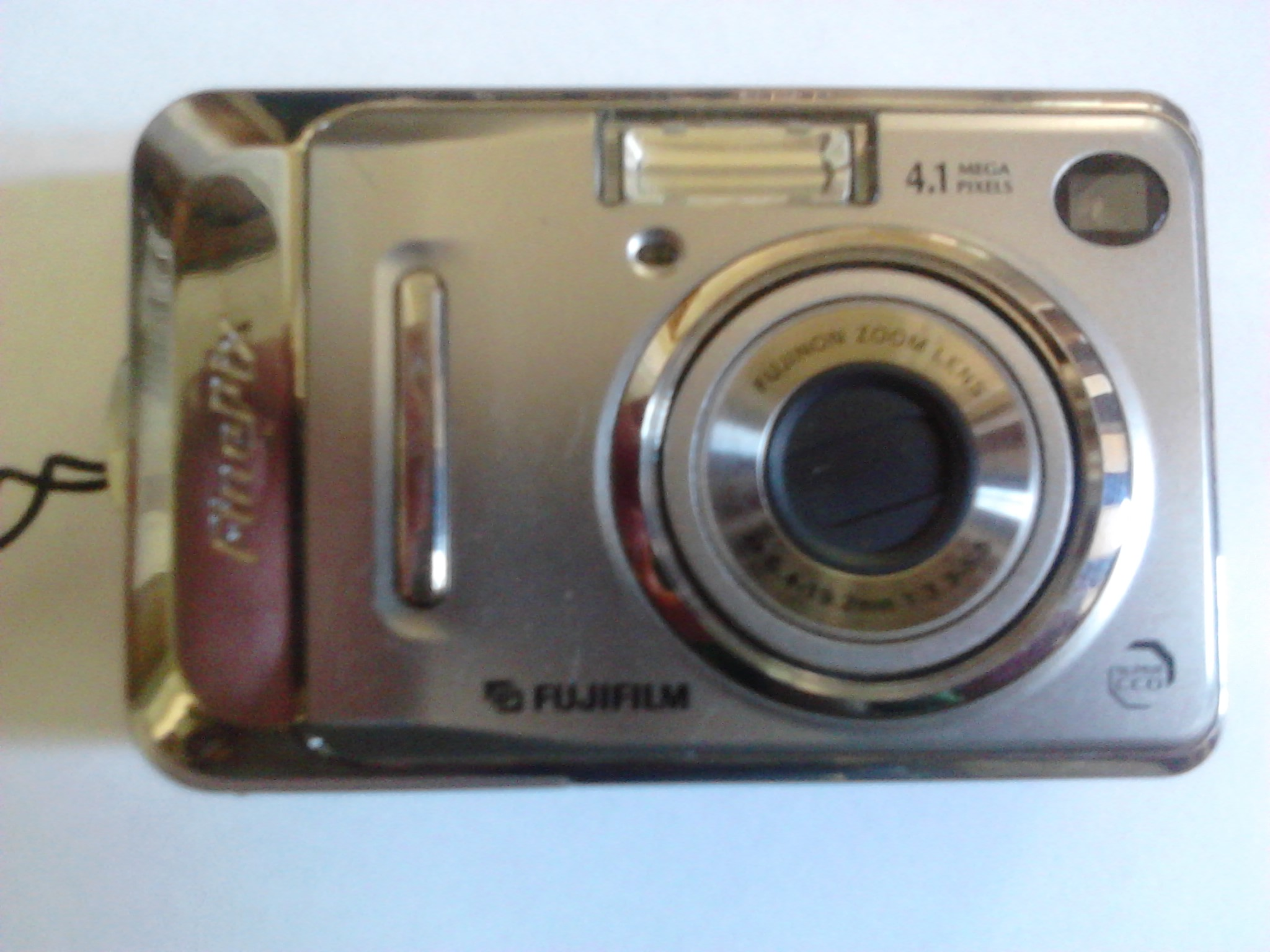
Fujifilm FinePix A400

The Fujifilm FinePix A series of digital cameras consists of the company's entry-level point and shoot models. The A series was created in late 2001 and was expanded a few years later when Fujifilm transitioned to a fully alphanumeric system of naming their digital cameras.

The first A series models were the 1.3-megapixel A101 and 2-megapixel A201, released in late 2001. The A-series cameras remained extremely basic until the successful FinePix 2600 and FinePix 2650 cameras evolved into the A205 and A210 in 2003. Over 20 models of A-series cameras have been produced and they have become progressively more sophisticated and smaller while retaining a low price. In 2008, the A series was partially succeeded by the FinePix J series.

Some A-series cameras have had standard CCD sensors while others have Fujifilm's own SuperCCD sensor. Cameras based on the latter have had very high image quality for their price.

All but the first two A-series cameras have used the xD-Picture Card flash memory format.

== Models ==
- A100
- A101
- A120
- A150
- A170
- A175
- A180
- A200
- A201
- A202
- A203 Zoom
- A205 Zoom
- A210 Zoom
- A220
- A225
- A230
- A235
- A303 Zoom
- A310
- A330
- A340
- A345
- A350
- A345
- A400
- A500
- A500 Blue
- A510 Black
- A510 Red
- A600
- A607
- A610
- A700
- A800
- A805
- A820
- A850
- A900
- AX350
- AV250
- AV230
- AV200
- AX510
- AV220
- AX550

=== A310 ===
3.1 MP, color digital camera.

As of the 2011 FinePix A310 cost as low as $15 used, with auctions starting also at 99¢ with original selling price $299 in 2003.

== See also ==
- Fujifilm FinePix
- Fujifilm cameras
- Fujifilm
