= Alpine A350 =

Former Formula 1 car designed for Alpine in 1968

- Category: Formula One
- Designer(s): Richard Bouleau
- Production: 1 (1968, Destroyed)
- Successor: Alpine A500

Technical specifications
- Chassis: Tubular polyester
- Suspension: Flat design by Richard Bouleau, carbon shock absorbers
- Length: 3,532 millimetres (139.1 in)
- Width: 1,790 millimetres (70 in)
- Height: 761 millimetres (30.0 in)
- Wheelbase: 2,281 millimetres (89.8 in)
- Engine: Renault-Gordini 2,996 cubic centimetres (182.8 cu in; 2.996 L) V8
- Transmission: BV Hewland DL200, manual, 5 speeds + reverse
- Power: 295 horsepower (299 PS; 220 kW) @ 7,500 rpm 372 newton-metres (274 lbf⋅ft) @ 3,500 rpm
- Weight: 540 kilograms (1,190 lb)
- Fuel: Elf
- Tires: Michelin

Competition history
- Notable entrants: Automobiles Alpine
- Notable drivers: Mauro Bianchi
Races	Wins	Poles	F/Laps
0	0	0	0

The Alpine A350 was a Formula One car designed for Alpine by Richard Bouleau in 1968. The model was powered by a V8 engine from Renault-Gordini sports cars. It featured an innovative flat suspension system and was tested by Mauro Bianchi on the Zolder and Zandvoort tracks. However, the project was vetoed by Renault because the engine was 100 hp (total of 295 hp (220 kW) weaker than the Cosworth DFVs, resulting in the A350 never participating in a Grand Prix.

== Concept ==
In the mid-1960s, Formula One underwent significant changes, including a new regulation that set the engine displacement limit to 3 liters (or 1.5 liters for turbocharged engines). At that time, engine suppliers in Formula One included companies like Maserati, Repco, Weslake, and Cosworth, with teams such as Lotus and Brabham among the clients. Manufacturers like Honda, Ferrari, and Matra even produced engines for their factory teams.

Jean Rédélé, the founder of Alpine, was secretly interested in entering Formula One. In 1963, he introduced Renault to the idea of entering the series, but due to Renault's conservative stance, he did not receive the company's support, and the Alpine F1 Team did not debut in Formula One at that time. Determined to enter the sport, Rédélé considered using a Gordini-produced V8 engine, despite its issues. Meanwhile, the French government announced a competition with a monetary prize for the "completely French" constructor who could present the most interesting car project. The favorite was Matra with its V12 engine. Amédée Gordini also wanted to participate with his V8 engine but did not have a suitable car. In 1968, Alpine agreed to collaborate with Gordini, considering that Brabham drivers had won titles between 1966 and 1967 with cars producing only 300 hp. Another reason was Alpine's success in Formula 2 and Formula 3.

Richard Bouleau was tasked with designing the car. He had designed his first car for a friend in 1962, and since 1963, he had been designing vehicles for Alpine. In 1965, Bouleau developed a concept for a flat suspension. Two years later, there were discussions about testing this solution, and the A350 model being built in Dieppe was chosen as the test platform. The car was constructed according to Formula One regulations. Initially, the A350 was considered an experimental project and was built in strict secrecy, but driver Mauro Bianchi convinced Jean Rédélé to attempt entering Formula One with the Alpine A350.

== Driver ==
Bianchi joined Alpine in 1964. At Alpine, he was not only a racing driver but also a tester and technician. His first task was to evaluate the capabilities of the prototype A110 with a 1.1-liter engine, which he described as a "monster" due to its peculiar handling. Bianchi also raced for Alpine in Formula 2, Formula 3, and the 24 Hours of Le Mans, where the company fielded models such as the M64 and M65 for him. From 1967 to 1968, he worked on the secret projects of the A220 and A350 models.

After an accident in the 1968 24 Hours of Le Mans race, Bianchi stopped racing and focused on testing and developing cars. He returned to racing in March 1969, but after the death of his brother Lucien in the 24 Hours of Le Mans, he retired from racing and served as a test driver for Alpine until 1976.

== Design ==
The engine was called Renault-Gordini despite Renault forbidding Rédélé from placing Renault logos on Alpine cars in 1965. However, Renault was heavily involved in the engine's construction.

The engine had a displacement of 2,996 cc. The hemispherical cylinder heads were made of aluminum. The engine featured four twin-barrel carburetors. The ignition system, which also used ignition coils, came from Marelli.

Due to the fact that the engine's maximum power was 310 hp at 7,500 rpm compared to the 400 hp engines of Cosworth and the 420 hp engines of Ferrari and Matra, Bouleau realized that to be competitive, the car needed to handle better than its rivals. One hope for achieving this was the new Michelin radial tires used by Alpine, which no other Formula One team was using. Bouleau's main hope, however, was his design of the so-called flat suspension, which was also being developed in the A220 and A221 models. The goal was to keep the wheels perpendicular to the ground regardless of the body's tilt. To achieve this, Bouleau arranged the front control arms in a parallelogram, and the wheels were not parallel to the vehicle frame. The upper control arms were not attached to the body but rather suspended on it, causing them to move with the body's sway. These control arms were equipped with "reaction points" located below their pivot axis in the frame and connected by two rods to an angular lever, causing their movements to be symmetrical. By properly placing the "reaction points", the movement of the frame and suspension did not affect the position of the wheels; the wheels always remained perpendicular to the ground regardless of the circumstances. In theory, the wheels were not independent but connected by triangulation; however, in practice, the tilt of each wheel was independent.

A strong point of the car was the braking system, featuring four ventilated disc brakes from ATE. The effectiveness of the brakes was explained by the design of the flat suspension: since the wheels were always perpendicular to the ground, braking was more efficient.

== Testing ==
Bianchi first took the A350 to the track in the second half of April 1968, conducting a shakedown at Michelin's test track in Ladoux. The car required numerous minor adjustments, but the team was encouraged by Bianchi's drive and decided to continue developing the model at the Circuit Zolder. At this stage, the car still had several relatively troublesome issues. During the tests at Zolder, where Bouleau was observing, the car's wheels appeared not to be spinning when viewed head-on. This peculiar behavior was so unusual that it caught the attention of a waiter from a nearby restaurant, who asked Bouleau how the illusion was created. This was related to the main goal of creating suspension resistant to swaying and changes in stability.

The team was satisfied with the results and decided to continue testing at the Circuit Zandvoort, where the Dutch Grand Prix was held at the time. Bianchi claimed that the lap times achieved during this test would place him in the middle of the grid. However, the results could, in fact, be considered unsatisfactory. The team then planned to enter the car in the French Grand Prix. The decision was driven not only by the desire to compete in Formula One but also to prove to Renault that Alpine was a legitimate racing team and to pressure them into building a competitive racing engine to replace the Gordini V8 unit.

Upon learning about the A350's entry into the French Grand Prix, Renault forbade the team from using the Renault-Gordini V8 engine. Renault's decision was driven by concerns over the brand's image and the performance of the Gordini engine. In 1969, Renault ceased work on the V8 engine and had no intentions of entering Formula One.

The only built A350 prototype was destroyed a few months after the 1968 French Grand Prix. All that remained of the car were the wheels and a fragment of the bodywork.

== Bibliography ==
- Smith, Roy (2008). Alpine & Renault: The Development of the Revolutionary Turbo F1 Car 1968 to 1979. Veloce Publishing Ltd. ISBN 978-1845841775.
