= Fujifilm FinePix A350 =

Overview
- Type: Point-and-shoot

Lens
- Lens: Fujinon 3x optical zoom lens

Sensor/medium
- Sensor: CCD
- Maximum resolution: 2592 x 1944
- Film speed: 64 - 400
- Storage media: XD-Picture Card (xD)

Focusing
- Focus modes: none
- Focus areas: Unknown
- Focus bracketing: Unknown

Exposure/metering
- Exposure modes: Portrait, landscape, sports, night, auto, and manual modes
- Exposure metering: Unknown
- Metering modes: Unknown

Flash
- Flash: Auto flash
- Flash bracketing: Unknown

Shutter
- Shutter: Unknown
- Shutter speed range: 2 to 1/2,000 sec.
- Continuous shooting: yes (depending on picture quality)

Viewfinder
- Viewfinder: Real image optical (appx. 75% coverage) and Electronic

Image processing
- White balance: yes
- WB bracketing: Unknown

General
- LCD screen: 1.8" Amorphous silicon TFT LCD (approx. 115,000 pixels / 90% coverage)
- Battery: Two AA batteries
- Optional battery packs: Two 2500 mAh NiMH AA rechargeable batteries
- Weight: 132g, without batteries and media

The Fujifilm FinePix A345 and A350 are entry-level digital point-and-shoot cameras. They feature 3x optical zoom, a resolution of 4.1 and 5.2 megapixels respectively, and 320x240 (at 15fps) movie recording with sound capabilities.

== Transferring pictures ==
The camera has a number of ways to transfer pictures.

- The XD-Picture Card (up to 512 MB) can be removed and inserted into a computer, printer, or other device that accepts such cards.
- Media can be transferred via USB with the supplied USB adapter or cable (or any USB cable with a USB-A connector on one end, and a mini-B connector on the other) to a computer, via DSC mode.
- Media can be transferred via USB to devices that support PTP while the camera is in PictBridge mode.
- Media can be displayed/recorded by any device that has standard A/V RCA connections (i.e. nearly any modern television, VCR, PVR, etc.)

== Boxed materials ==
Included with a retail purchase of the camera are:

- The camera itself.
- A 16Mb XD-Picture Card
- A video adapter cable
- A USB adapter cable
- Software CD for Windows and Macintosh
- Documents:
  - A 93 page manual
  - Quickstart page in English
  - Quickstart page in Spanish
  - Safety instructions page
  - Registration card
  - Sample "real pictures" advertisement

== Sample pictures ==
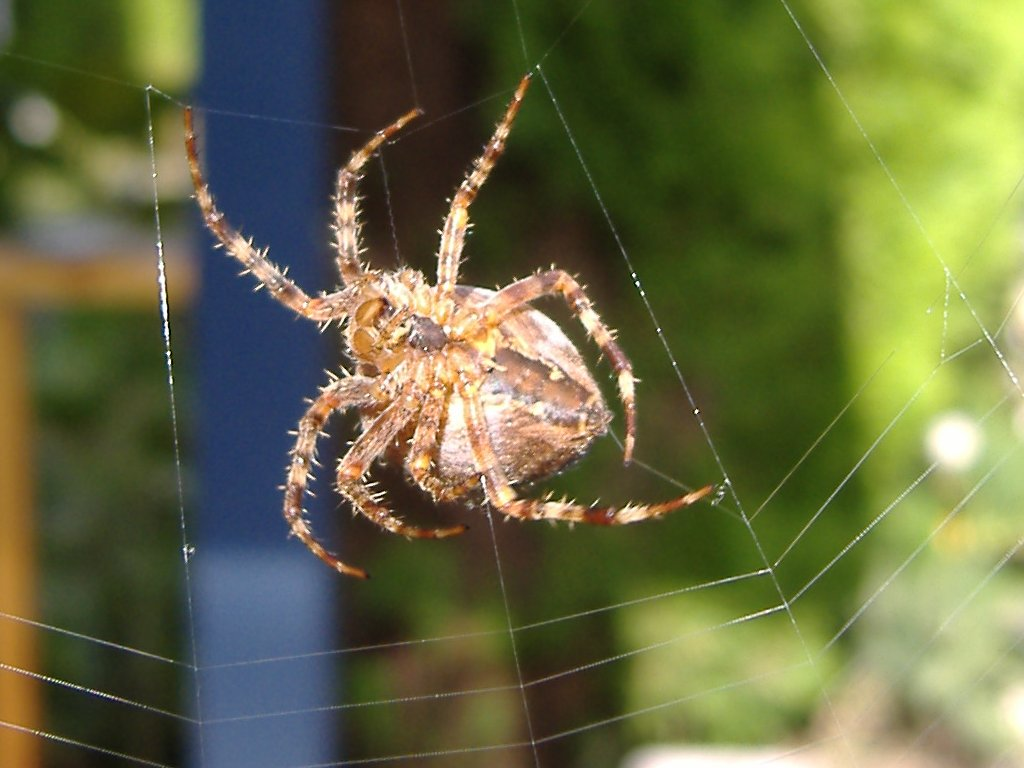
Garden spider, taken with FinePix A345

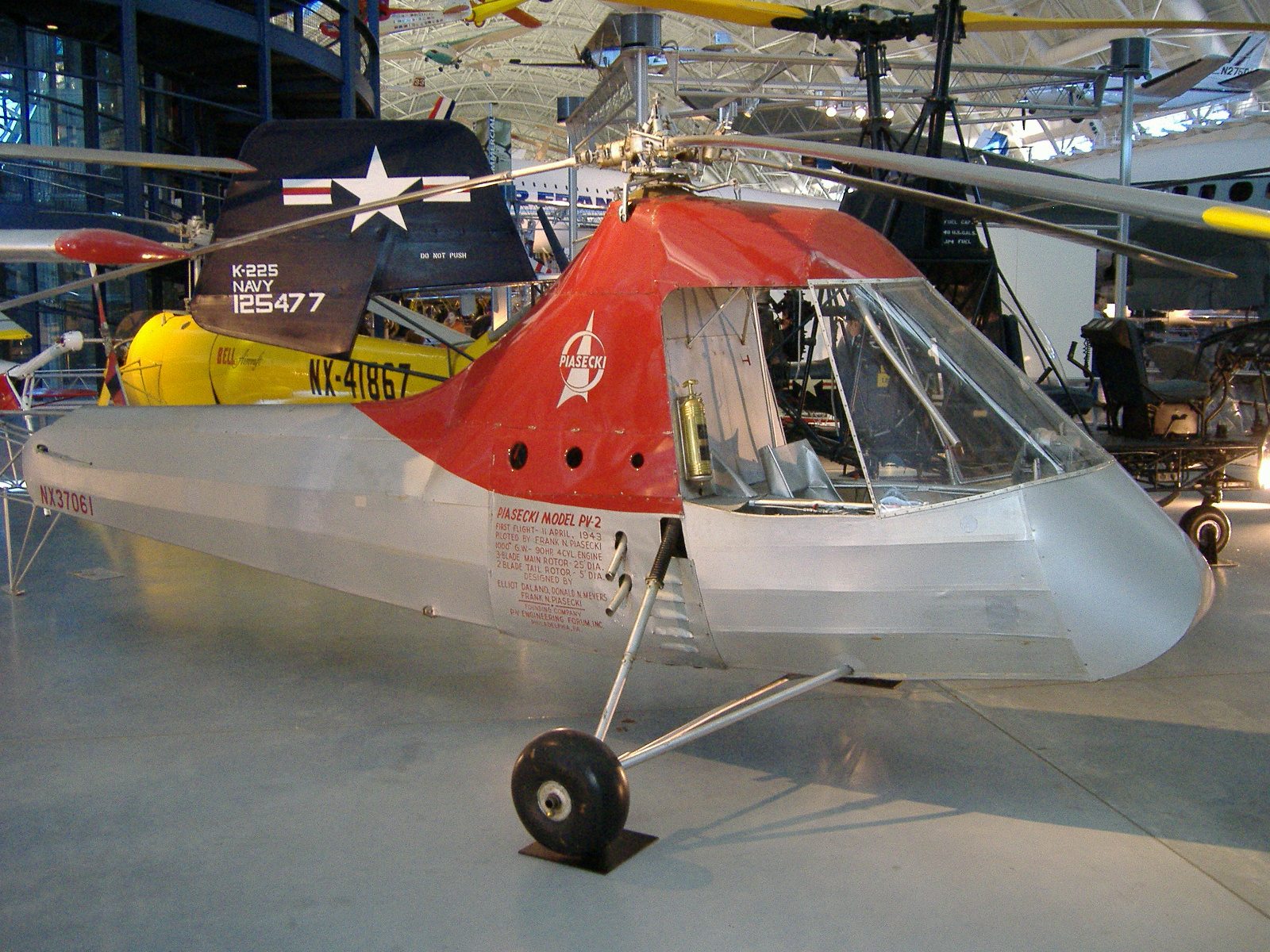
Indoor photo taken with FinePix A345
