= Fujifilm FinePix M603 =

Camera photography

The Fuji Finepix M603 is an upright point and shoot camera capable of capturing images of resolutions up to 6.03MP. The camera also includes a 320x240 pixel VGA video capture mode and is fitted with a 2.5in LCD, yet completely lacks a viewfinder.
