= Fujifilm =

Japanese multinational conglomerate

Fujifilm Holdings Corporation
- Logo used from 2006

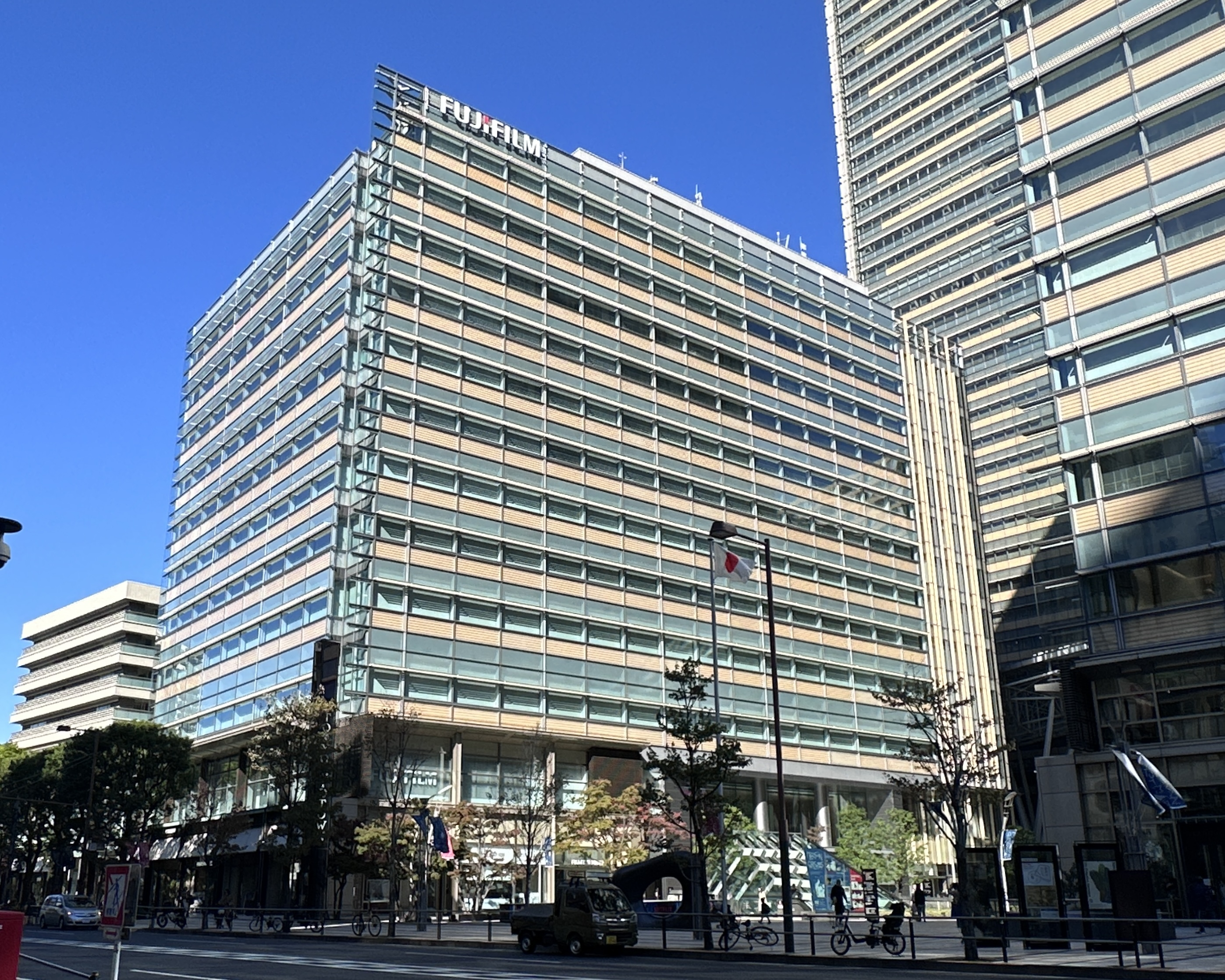
- Headquarters at Tokyo Midtown in Minato, Tokyo
- Native name: 富士フイルムホールディングス株式会社
- Romanized name: Fuji-fuirumu Hōrudingusu kabushiki gaisha
- Formerly: Fuji Photo Film Co., Ltd. (1934–2006)
- Type: Public
- Traded as: TYO: 4901; TOPIX Large70 component
- Industry: Document solutions; Digital imaging; Medical imaging; Cosmetics; Regenerative Medicine; Stem Cells; Biologics
- Founded: January 20, 1934; 92 years ago
- Headquarters: Midtown West, Tokyo Midtown; Akasaka, Minato, Tokyo, Japan
- Area served: Worldwide
- Key people: Kenji Sukeno (chairman); Teiichi Goto (president and CEO)
- Products: Digital imaging; Medical imaging; Photographic materials; Biologics manufacturing, equipment and services; Cosmetics
- Revenue: JP¥2.32 trillion (FY 2019)
- Operating income: JP¥186.57 billion (2019)
- Net income: JP¥124.99 billion (2019)
- Total assets: JP¥3.32 trillion (2019)
- Number of employees: 73,906 (2019)
- Website: holdings.fujifilm.com

Fujifilm Holdings Corporation (富士フイルムホールディングス株式会社, Fuji-fuirumu Hōrudingusu kabushiki gaisha), trading as Fujifilm (富士フイルム, Fuji-fuirumu), or simply Fuji (originally Fuji Photo Film Co) is a Japanese multinational conglomerate headquartered in Tokyo, Japan, operating in the areas of photography, optics, office and medical electronics, biotechnology, and chemicals.

The company started as a manufacturer of photographic films, which it still produces. Fujifilm products include document solutions, medical imaging and diagnostics equipment, cosmetics, pharmaceutical drugs, regenerative medicine, stem cells, biologics manufacturing, magnetic tape data storage, optical films for flat-panel displays, optical devices, photocopiers, printers, digital cameras, color films, color paper, photofinishing and graphic arts equipment and materials.

Fujifilm is part of the Sumitomo Mitsui Financial Group financial conglomerate (keiretsu).

== History ==
=== 20th century ===
Former Fujifilm logo. The "Fuji" logo on the left was introduced in 1980, while the "Fujifilm" wordmark on the right was introduced in 1985. Both were replaced with the current logo in 2006.

Fuji Photo Film Co., Ltd. was established in 1934 as a subsidiary of Daicel producing photographic films. In the 1940s, Fuji Photo entered the optical glasses, lenses and equipment markets. In 1962, Fuji Photo and UK-based Rank Xerox Limited (now Xerox Limited) launched Fuji Xerox Co., Ltd. through a joint venture.

From the mid-1950s, Fuji Photo began establishing overseas sales bases. In the 1980s, the company expanded its production and other operations internationally. During this period, Fuji Photo developed digital technologies for its photography, medical, and printing sectors. This led to the invention of computed radiography (CR), which addressed several problems associated with traditional radiography, including reducing radiation exposure for both technicians and patients. Fujifilm's systems were marketed and sold under the FCR brand.

Like its rival Eastman Kodak which dominated in the US, Fuji Photo enjoyed a longtime near-monopoly on camera film in Japan. Fuji increased market share in the US by becoming one of the title sponsors of the 1984 Los Angeles Olympics, offering cheaper camera film, and establishing a film factory in the US.

In 1994 vice president Juntarō Suzuki announced that the company would halt paying sōkaiya, a type of protection racket bribe, to Yakuza. In retaliation he was murdered in front of his home by Yakuza. In May 1995, Kodak filed a petition with the US Commerce Department under section 301 of the Commerce Act arguing that its poor performance in the Japanese market was a direct result of unfair practices adopted by Fuji. The complaint was lodged by the US with the World Trade Organization. On January 30, 1998, the WTO announced a "sweeping rejection of Kodak's complaints" about the film market in Japan.

=== 21st century ===
In March 2006, Noritsu and Fuji announced a strategic alliance for Noritsu to manufacture all of Fuji's photofinishing hardware, such as mini labs. Each company produces its own software for the mini labs.

On September 19, 2006, Fujifilm announced plans to establish a holding company, Fujifilm Holdings Corp. Fujifilm and Fuji Xerox would become subsidiaries of the holding company. A representative of the company reconfirmed its commitment to film, which accounts for 3% of sales.

On January 31, 2018, Fujifilm announced that it would acquire a 50.1% controlling stake in Xerox for US$6.1 billion, which will be amalgamated into its existing Fuji Xerox business. The deal was subsequently dropped after intervention by activist investors Carl Icahn and Darwin Deason. In late 2019, Fujifilm announced its acquisition of Xerox's 25% stake in the 57-year-old joint venture, Fuji Xerox.

In December 2019, Fujifilm acquired Hitachi's diagnostic imaging business for US$1.63 billion.

Amid the 2020 COVID-19 pandemic, one of Fujifilm Toyama Chemical drugs, i.e. favipiravir, an antiviral commercially named Avigan, was being considered as a possible treatment for the virus, after having been approved by China, Russia, and Indonesia authorities by June 2020.

In June 2020, Fujifilm announced a US$928 million investment to a Denmark-based biologics production facility, which it acquired from Biogen a year earlier for around US$890 million, to double the manufacturing capacity. A tape cartridge using strontium ferrite that could store up to 400TB was showcased by Fujifilm in the late same month.

In the 2020s, Fujifilm's digital camera business grew significantly. Demand for models such as the X100VI exceeded production capacity after its launch. Fujifilm's share of digital camera shipments among major Japanese manufacturers rose from 6.0% in 2023 to 11.8% in 2025, when it shipped about 1.16 million cameras and moved ahead of Nikon into third place.

== Subsidiaries ==
Fuji Xerox was a joint venture between Fujifilm and Xerox Corporation of North America. After the dissolution of their partnership in 2019, Fujifilm made it a wholly owned subsidiary. In January 2020, the corporate name change was announced, from Fuji Xerox to Fujifilm Business Innovation Corporation, effective on April 1, 2021.

Fujifilm bought Sericol Ltd., a UK-based printing ink company specializing in screen, narrow web, and digital print technologies in March 2005.

Fujifilm de México is a Fujifilm subsidiary in Mexico that has sold Fujifilm products since 1934 and has been recognized as one of The Best Mexican Companies (Las Mejores Empresas Mexicanas) from 2012 to 2015, a recognition promoted by Banamex, Deloitte México and Tecnológico de Monterrey.

Fujifilm is active in pharmaceutical products and contract manufacturing through its subsidiaries including Fujifilm Toyama Chemical, Fujifilm Diosynth Biotechnologies, etc.

As of July 2020, the Fujifilm Group has two operating companies, which encompass more than 300 subsidiaries in total, and three "shared services companies" under the umbrella. The group structure and a list of some Fuji film subsidiaries are the following:

- Fujifilm Holdings Corporation
  - Fujifilm Corporation
    - Fujifilm Imaging Systems
      - Fuji Color Photo Center
    - Fujifilm Medical
    - Fujifilm Pharma
    - Fujifilm RI Pharma
    - Fuji film Toyama Chemical
    - Fujifilm Dimatix
    - Fujifilm Diosynth Biotechnologies
    - FUJIFILM Cellular Dynamics
    - Fujifilm Photo Manufacturing
    - Fujifilm Fine Chemicals
    - Fujifilm Electronics Materials
    - Fujifilm Engineering
    - Fujifilm Biosciences
    - Fujifilm Optics
    - Fujifilm Opto Materials
    - Fujifilm Global Graphic Systems
    - Fujifilm Computer Systems
    - Fujifilm Software
    - Fujifilm Techno Services
    - Fujifilm Techno Products
    - Fujifilm Business Supply
    - Fujifilm Digital Press
    - Fujifilm Media Crest
    - Fujifilm Sonosite, Inc.
    - Fujifilm Shizuoka
    - Fujifilm Kyushu
    - Fujifilm Logistics
    - Fujifilm VisualSonics
  - Fuji Xerox
    - Fuji Xerox Printing Systems Sales
    - Fuji Xerox Information Systems
    - Fuji Xerox System Service
    - Fuji Xerox Interfield
    - Fuji Xerox Advanced Technologies
    - Fuji Xerox Manufacturing
    - Fuji Xerox Service Creative
    - Fuji Xerox Service Link
    - Fuji Xerox Learning Institute
  - Fujifilm Business Expert Corporation
  - Fujifilm Systems Corporation
  - Fujifilm Intellectual Property Research Co., Ltd.

== Products ==
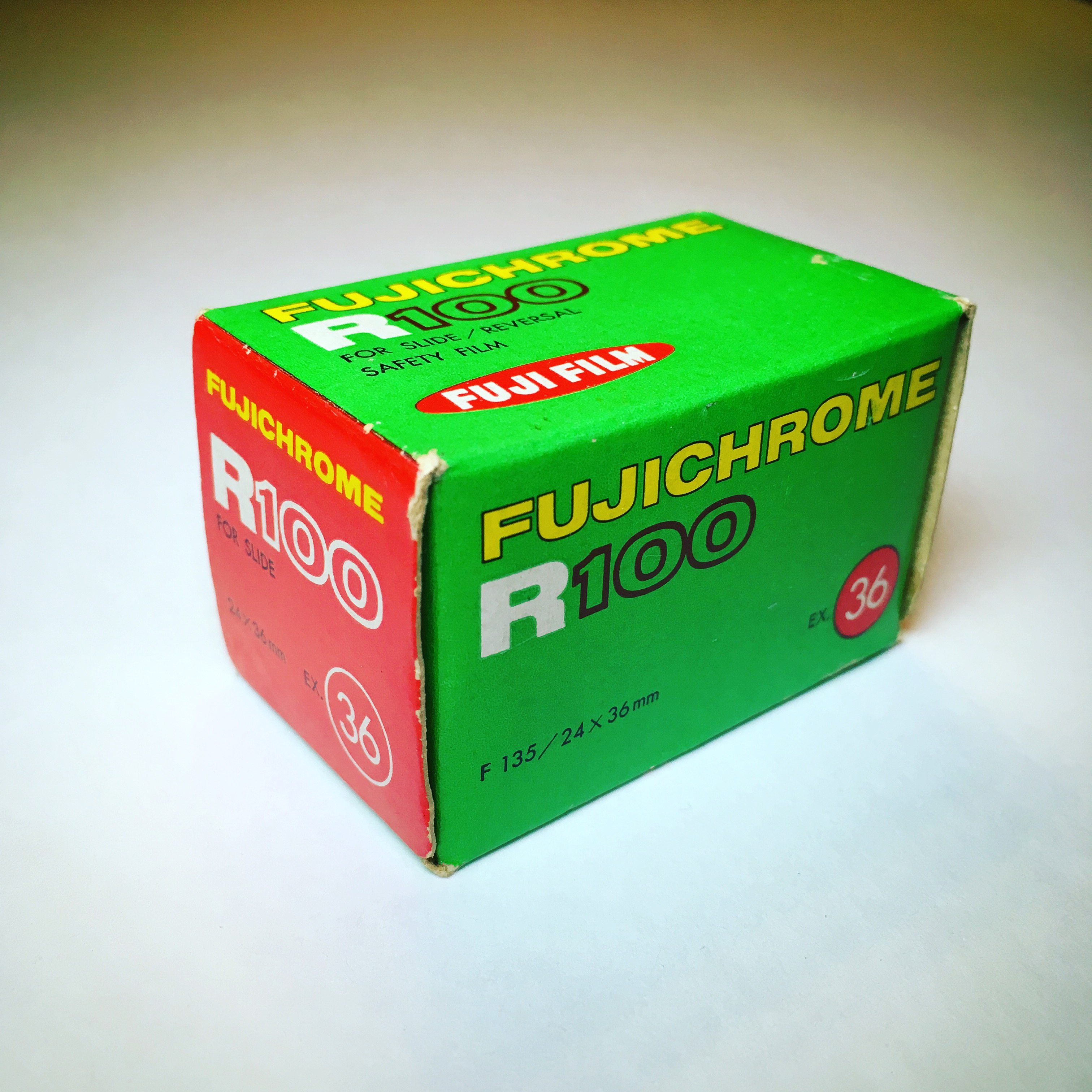
Fujichrome R100 35mm film (expired: 1972)

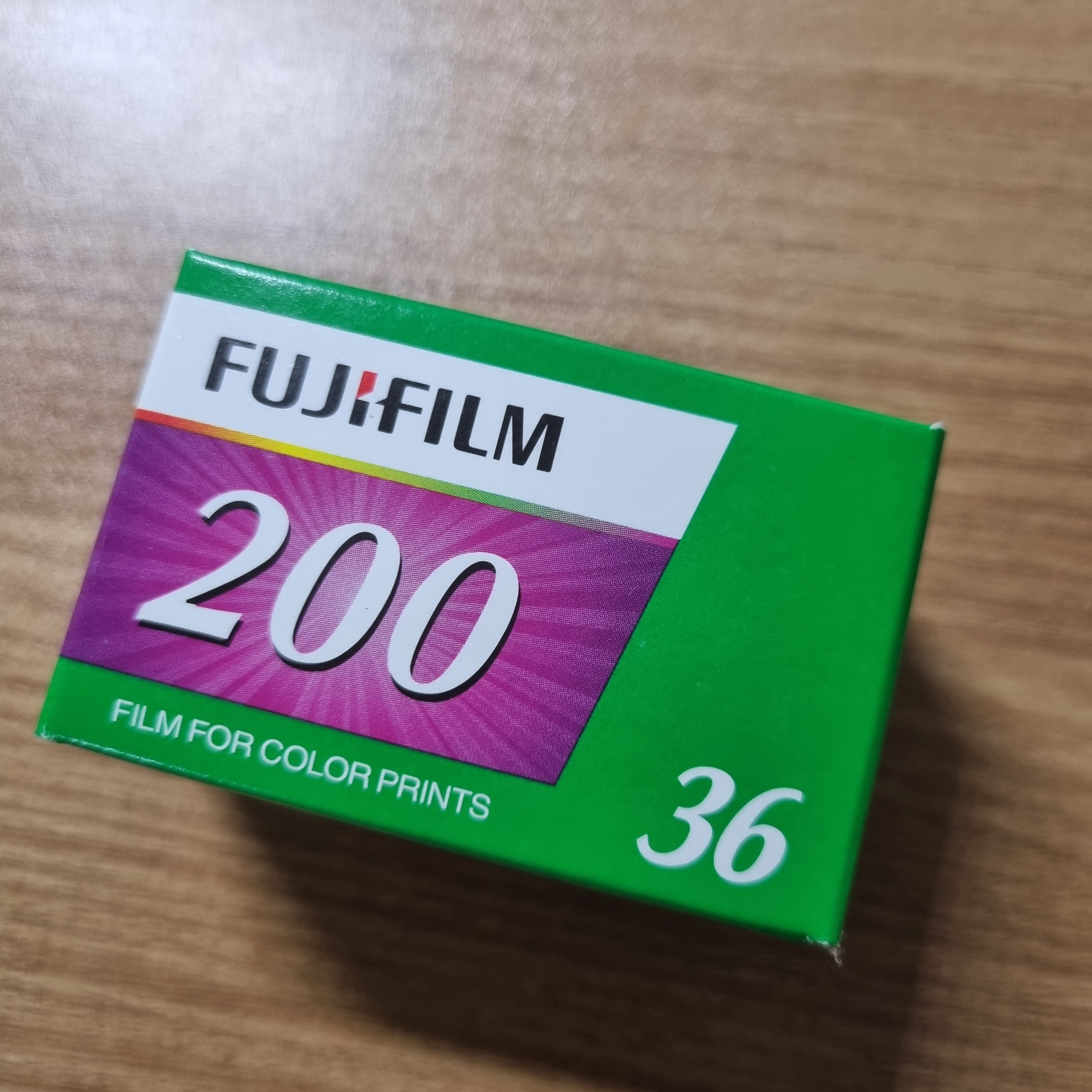
Fujifilm 200 35mm color film

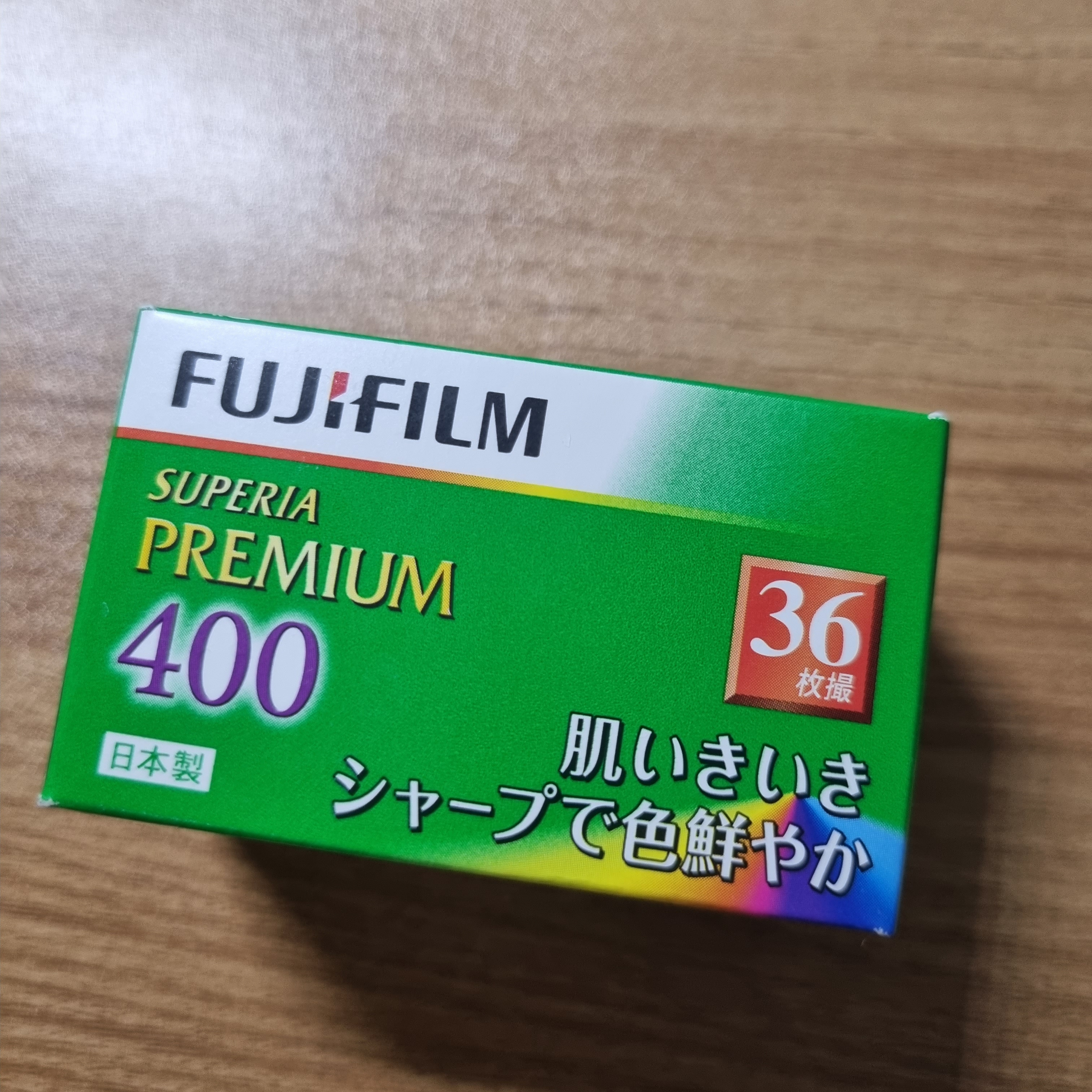
Fujifilm Superia Premium 400 35mm color film

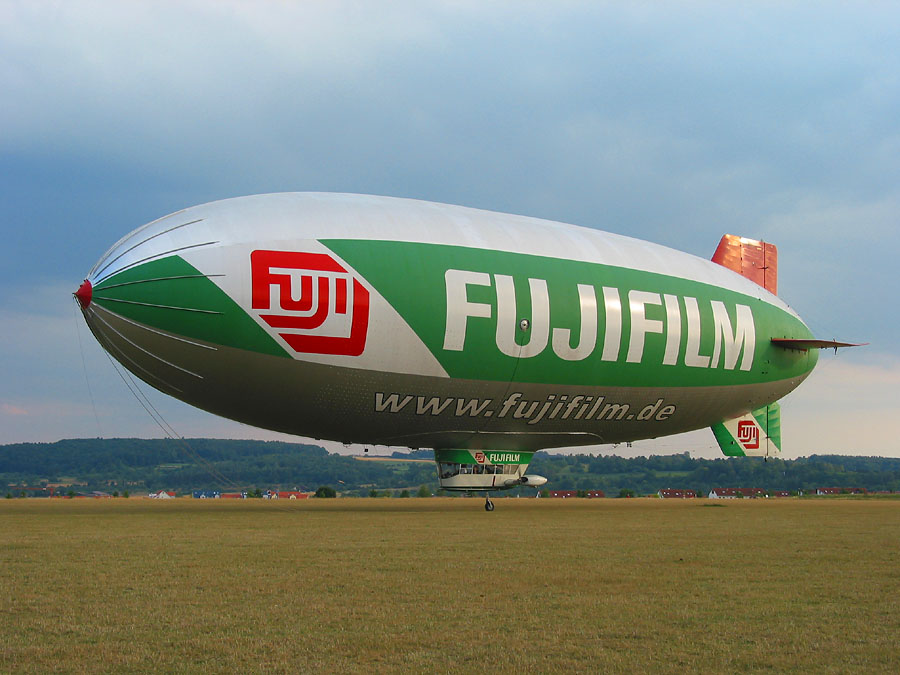
A Fujifilm blimp

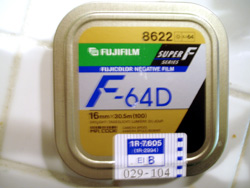
A 100-foot tin of 16 mm Fujifilm

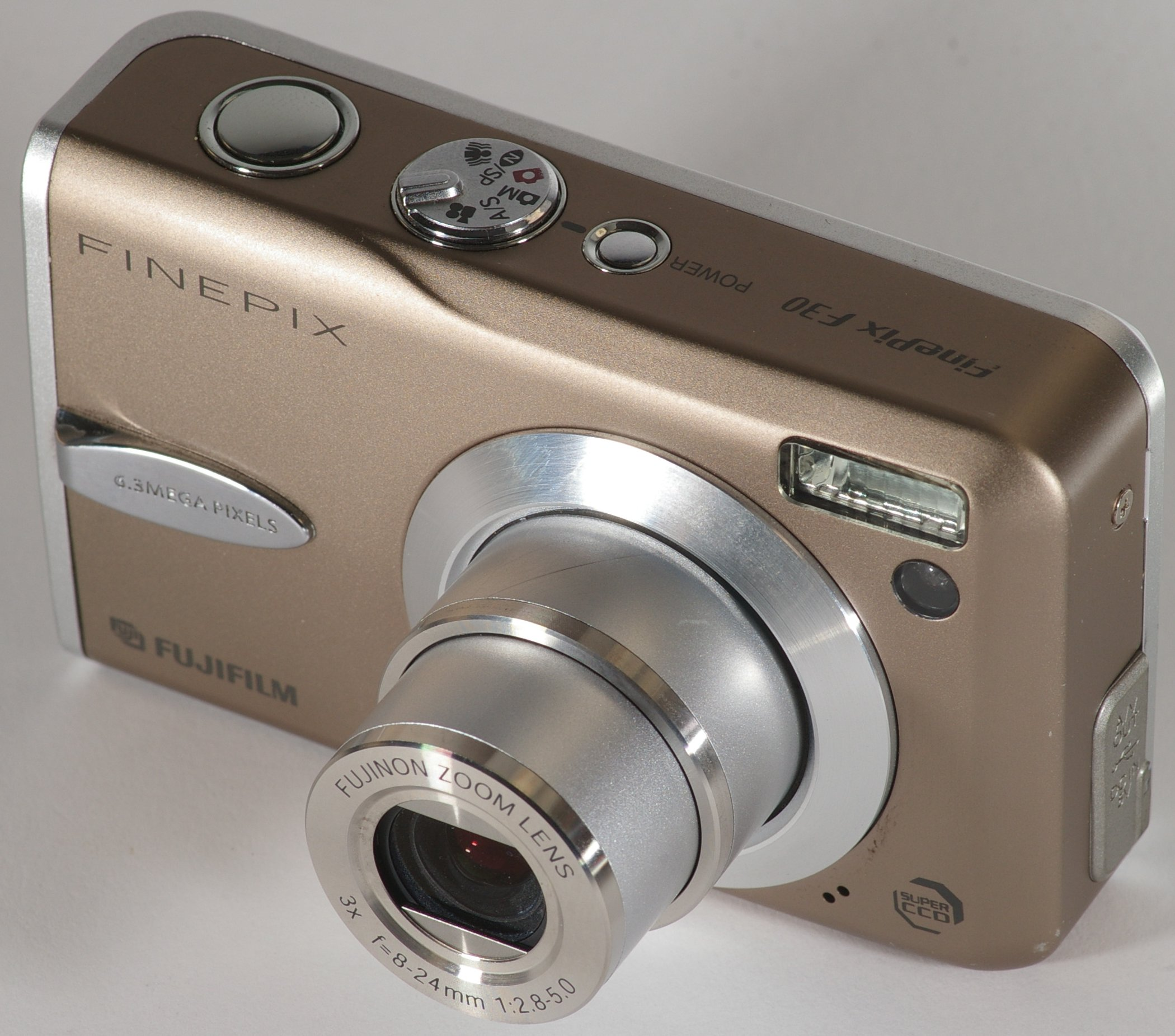
Fujifilm FinePix F30 camera

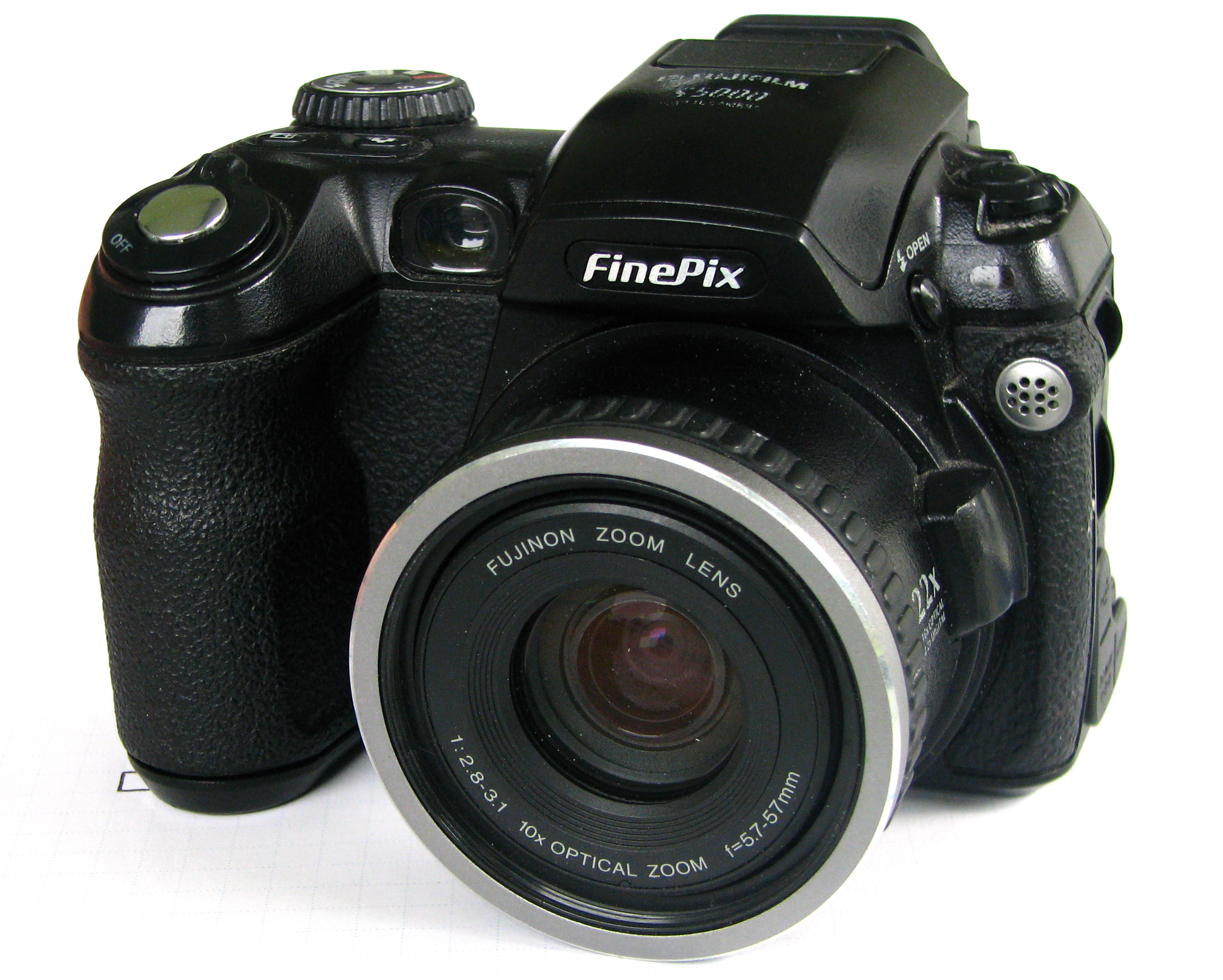
Fujifilm FinePix S5000

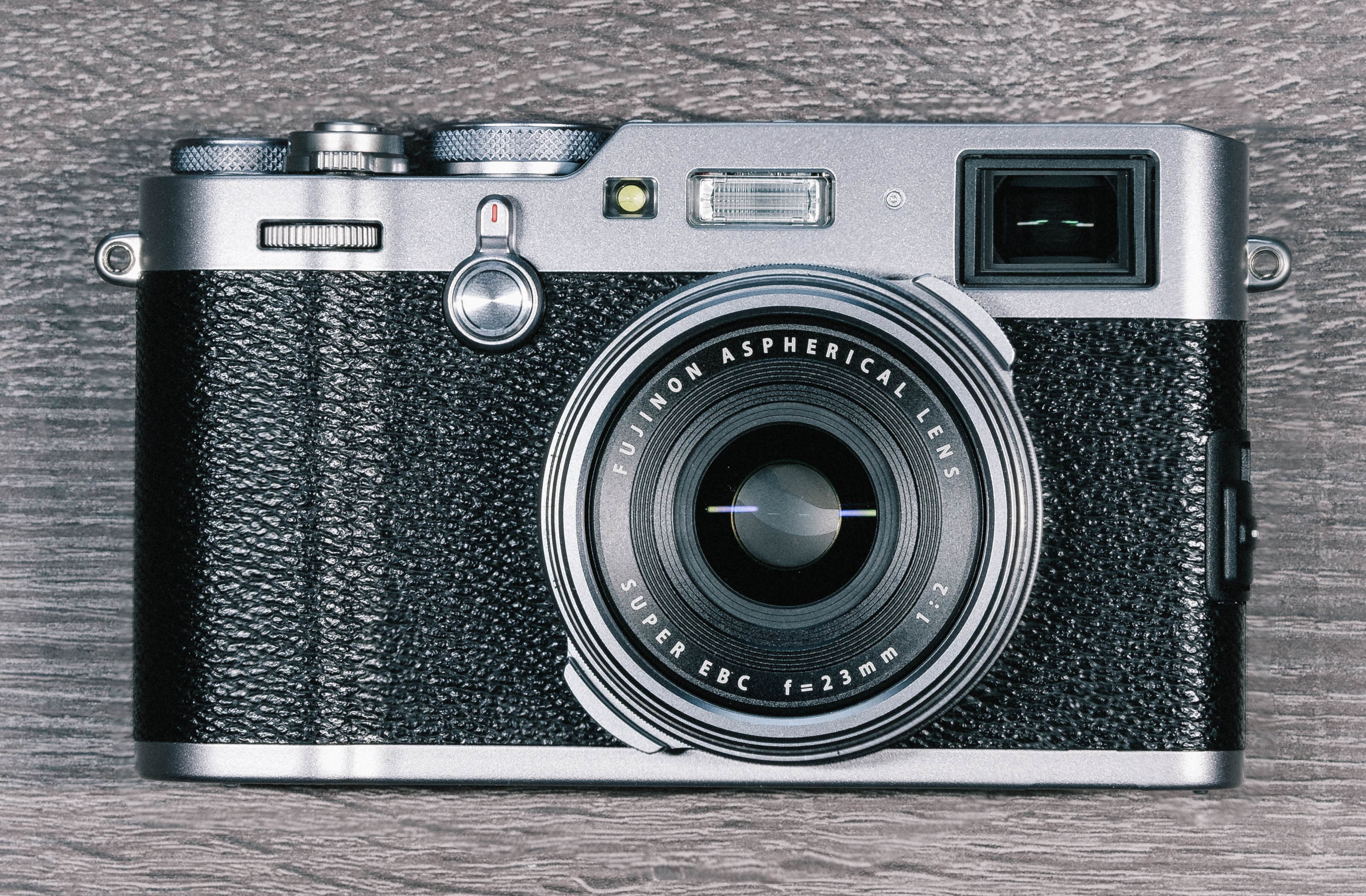
Fujifilm X100F premium compact camera

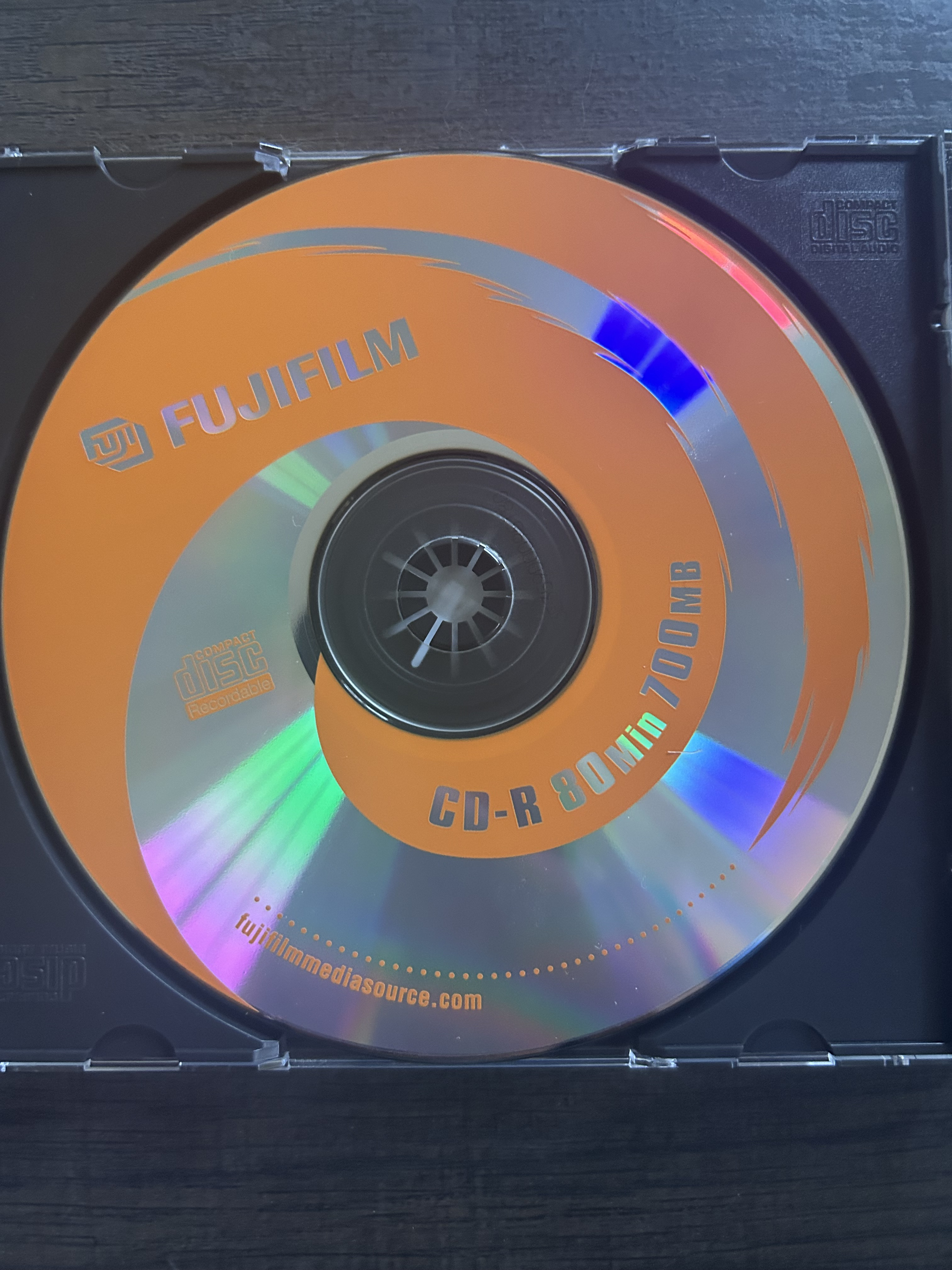
Fujiflim CD-R 700MB

=== Photographic film ===
Photographic films produced by Fujifilm for the domestic Japanese market as of 2026:

- Fujichrome color reversal (slide) films.
  - Velvia 50 & 100
  - Provia 100F

- Fujicolor color negative (print) films
  - Fujicolor 100
  - Fujifilm Superia Premium 400
- Fuji Neopan black & white negative film.
  - Neopan ACROS II 100
- Instax instant film and cameras
  - Mini (46 × 62 mm)
  - Wide (99 × 62 mm)
  - Square (62 × 62 mm)

=== Cameras and lenses ===
- Fujifilm GFX series cameras (medium format sensor)
- Fujifilm X series cameras (all current models APS-C; some past models featured a 2/3" sensor)
- The Fujifilm FinePix series of digital cameras including:
  - Nikon F-mount compatible digital SLRs like the FinePix S5 Pro
  - Compact cameras like the FinePix F-series and FinePix Z-Series, Fujifilm X100 and X100S
  - Waterproof and shockproof FinePix XP-Series digital cameras
- The Clear Shot series of 35mm compact cameras
- Instax series of instant camera
- Fotorama series of instant camera
- Various rangefinder cameras, and older Fujica film cameras
- Professional film cameras such as the GA645, GW670, GW690, GF670, GF670W and Fuji GX680 6x8cm medium format cameras
- Fujinon camera lenses and binoculars: including the most widely used television lenses in the world

=== Other ===
- Photographic paper
- Inkjet printer paper
- Magnetic media, including audiotape (also includes the Axia brand) until 2009, videotape, Magnetic tape data storage and floppy disks
- Optical media, such as DVDs and CDs, mostly produced by Ritek and Taiyo Yuden; some by Philips
- Flash memory
- Fujifilm X-Trans series of CMOS image sensors.
- Photostimulable Phosphor Plate - X-ray film.
- Base material for LCD displays
- Recording Media
- Microfilm
- Minilab equipments, announced in 2006 a global alliance with Noritsu Koki, together holding a market share of more than 80% of the global market
- Digital X-Ray, digital mammography and computed radiography devices
- Synapse Radiology PACS
- Synapse Cardiovascular PACS
- Synapse RIS
- Ultrasound systems
- Endoscopy
- Specialty Chemicals
- Biologics contract manufacturing and development
- Biomaterials
- Regenerative medicine
- Cosmetics (ASTALIFT series, Nanolift series)
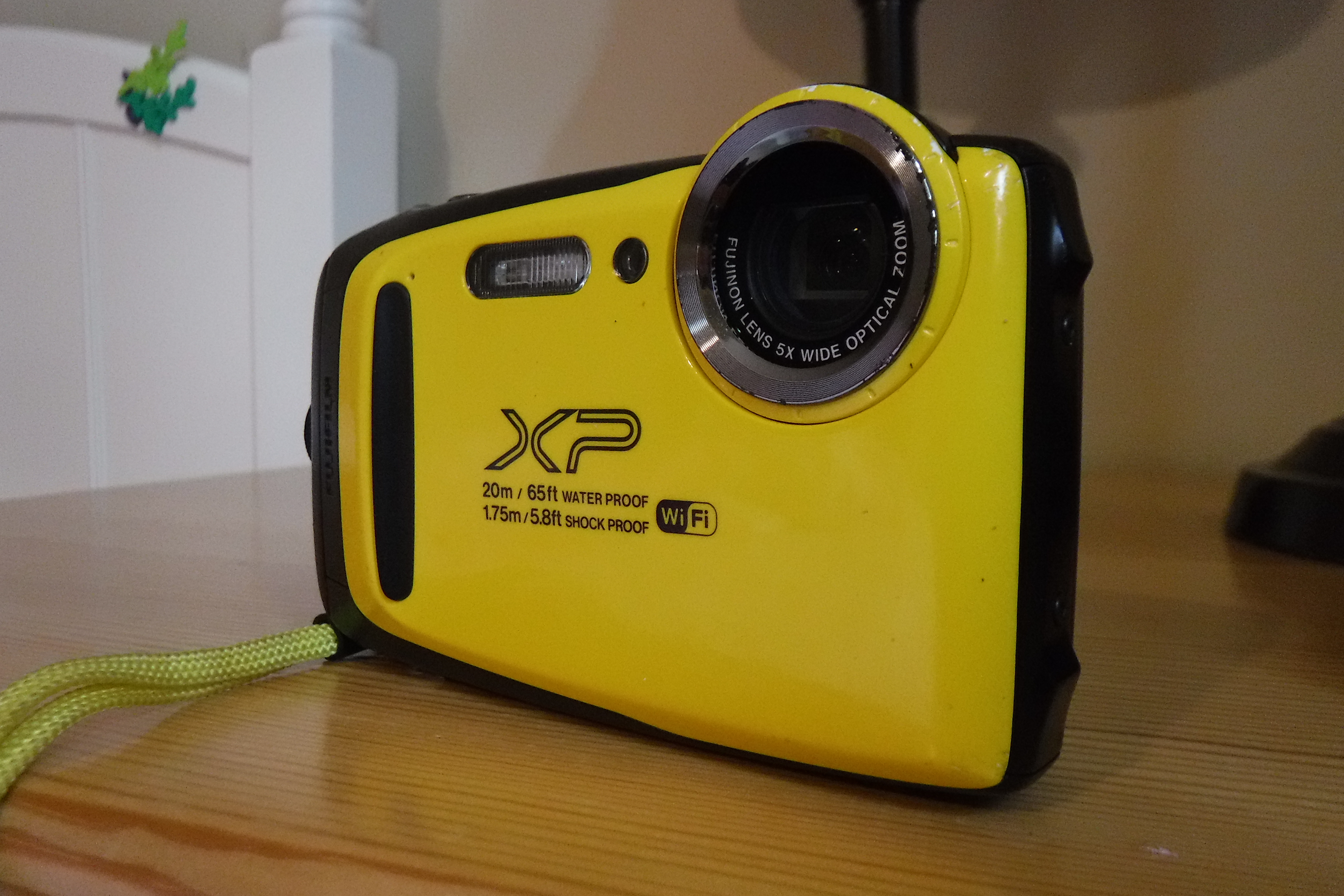
Fujifilm FinePix XP130 yellow camera

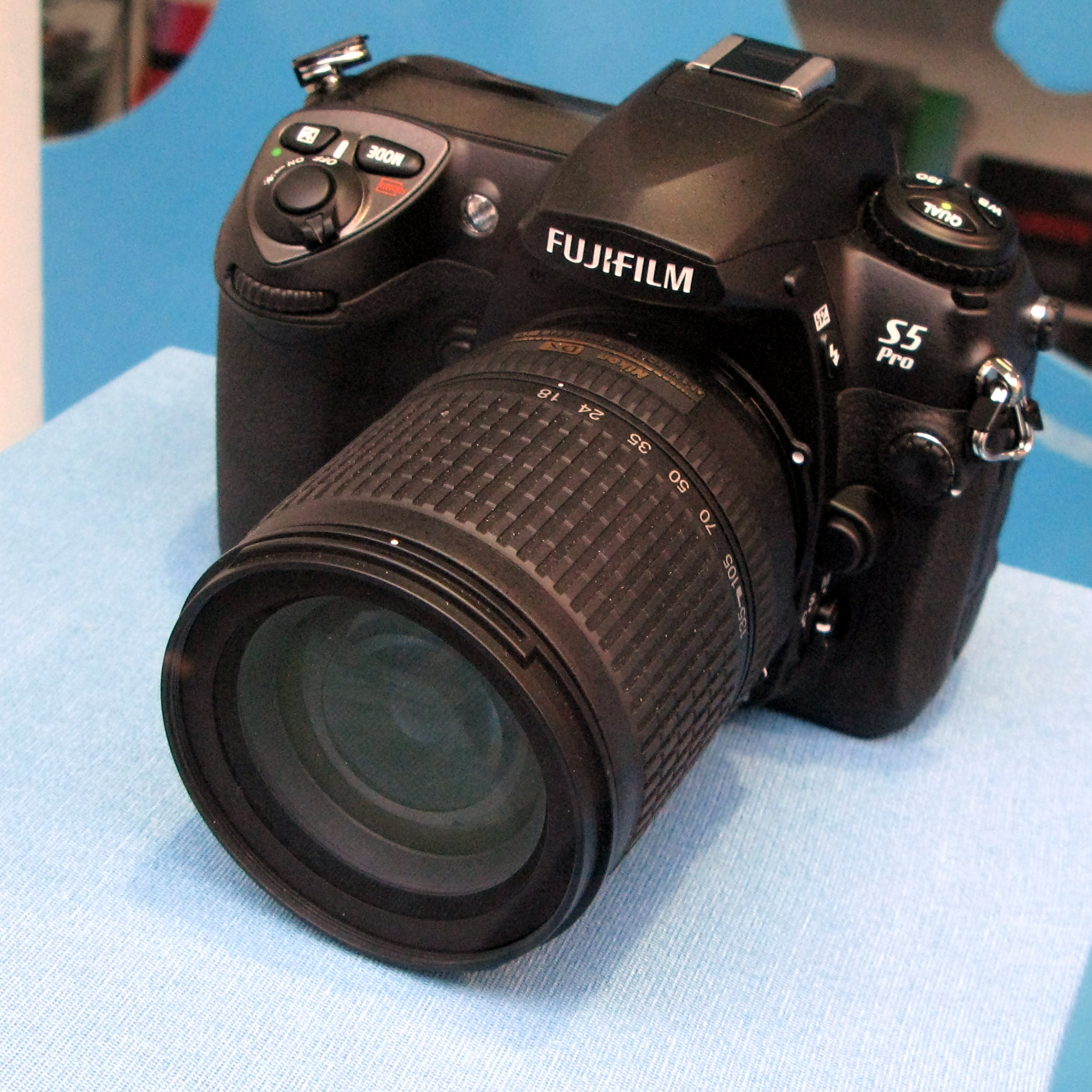
Fujifilm S5 Pro

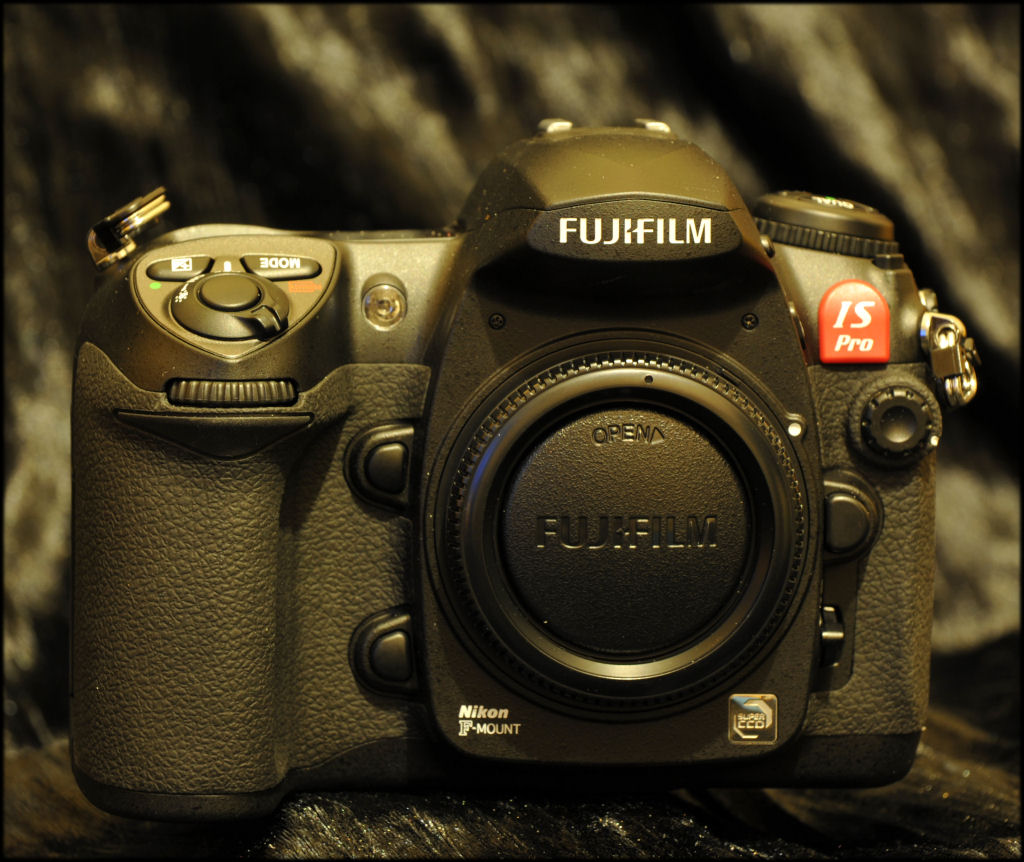
Fujifilm IS Pro

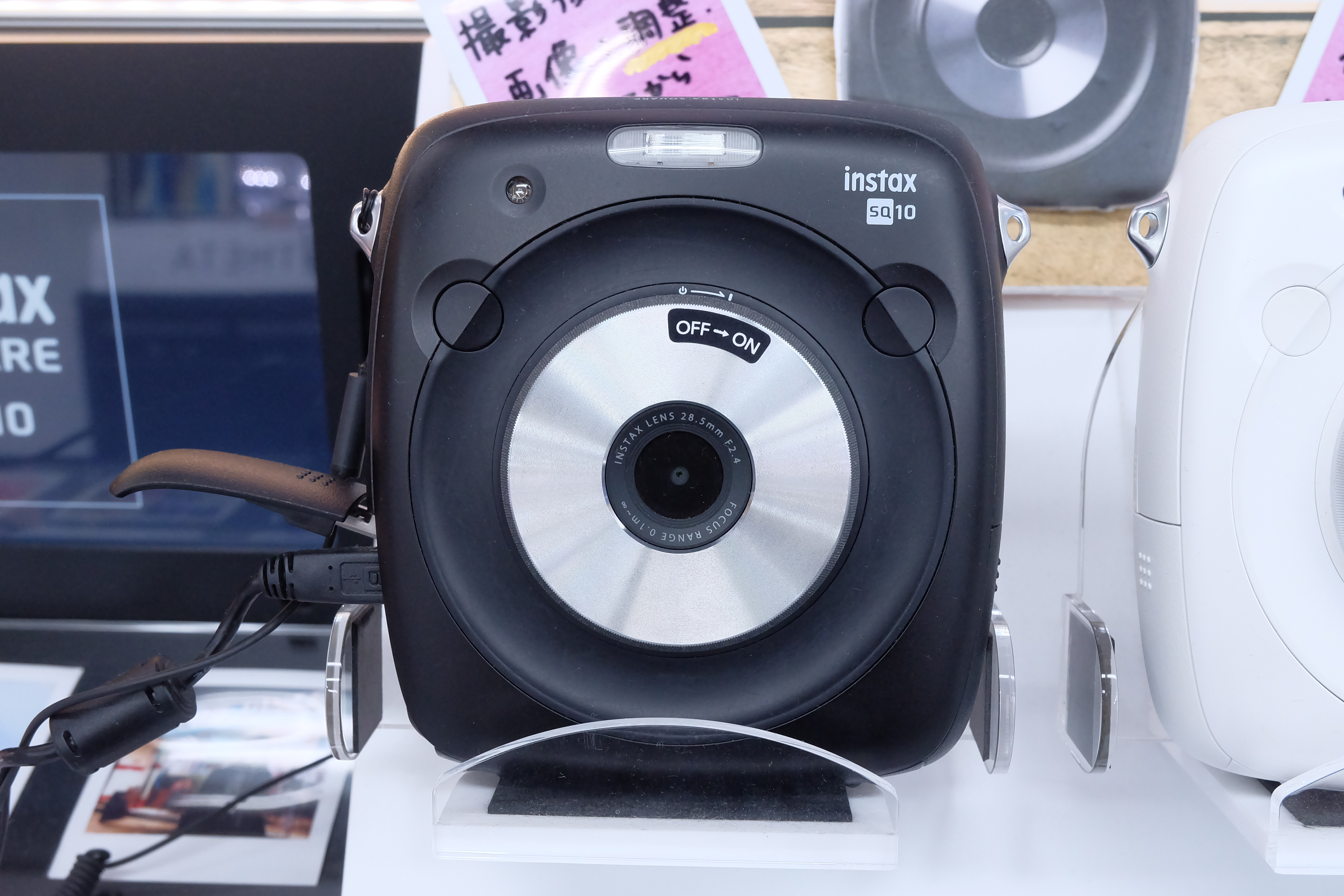
Instant camera Fujifilm Instax SQUARE SQ10

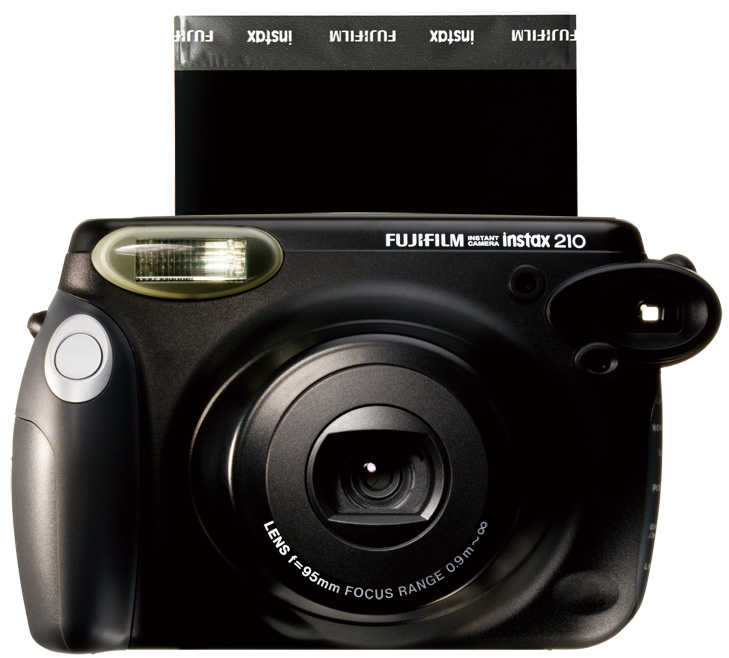
Instant camera Fujifilm Instax 210

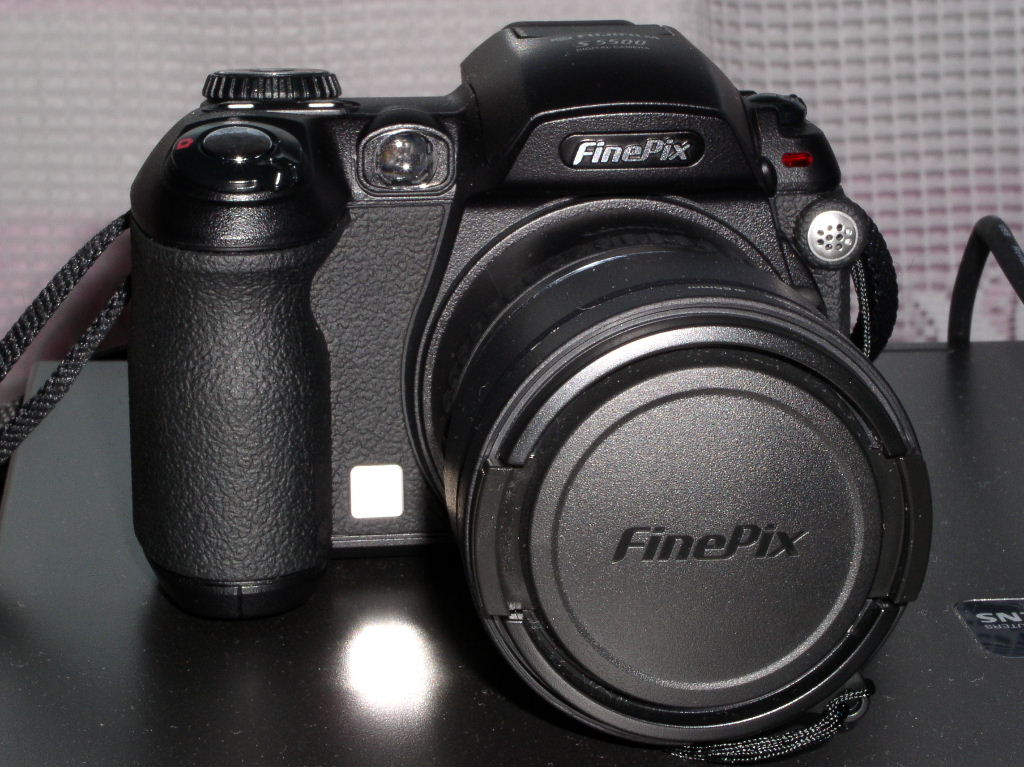
Fujifilm FinePix S5500

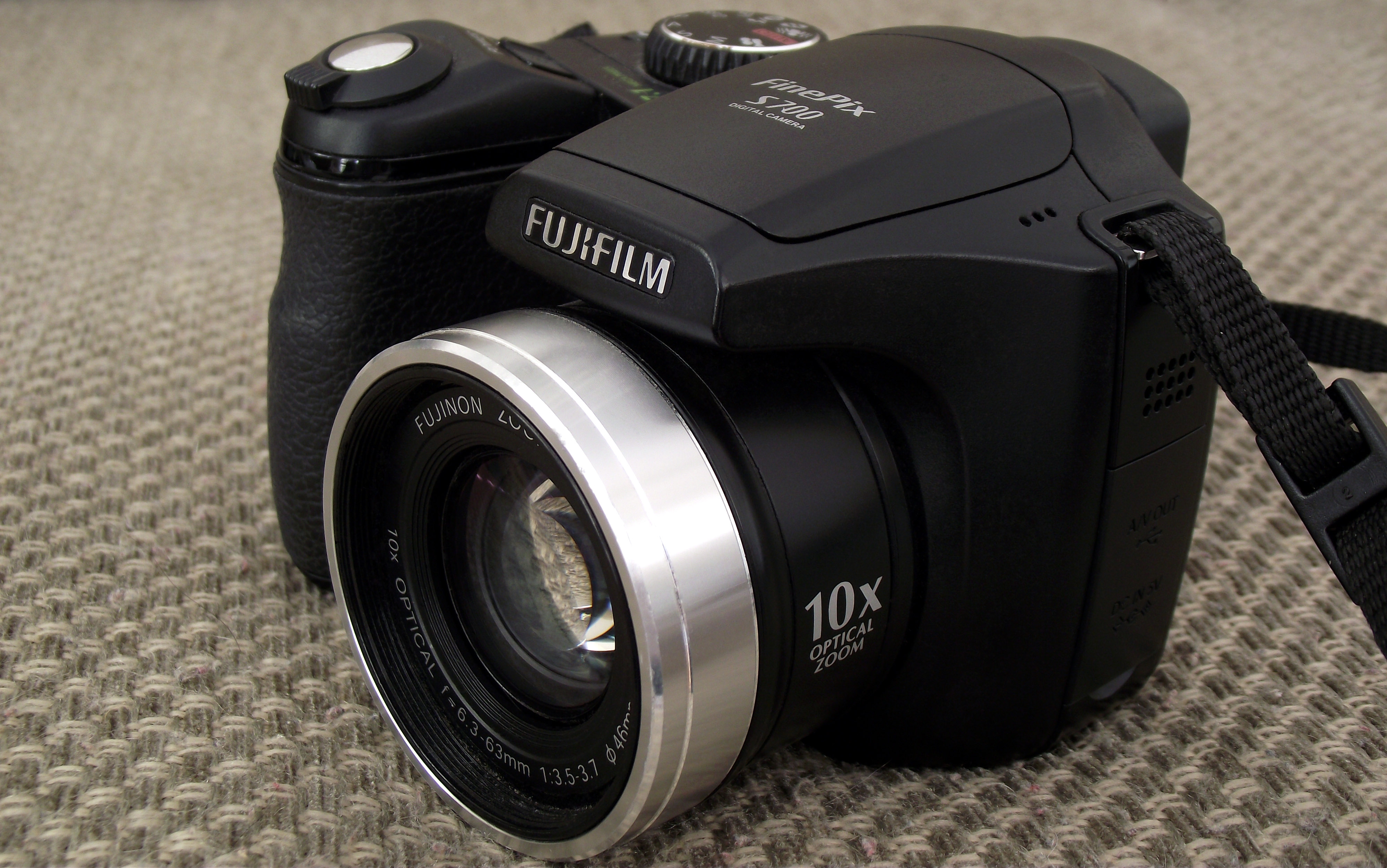
Fujifilm FinePix S700

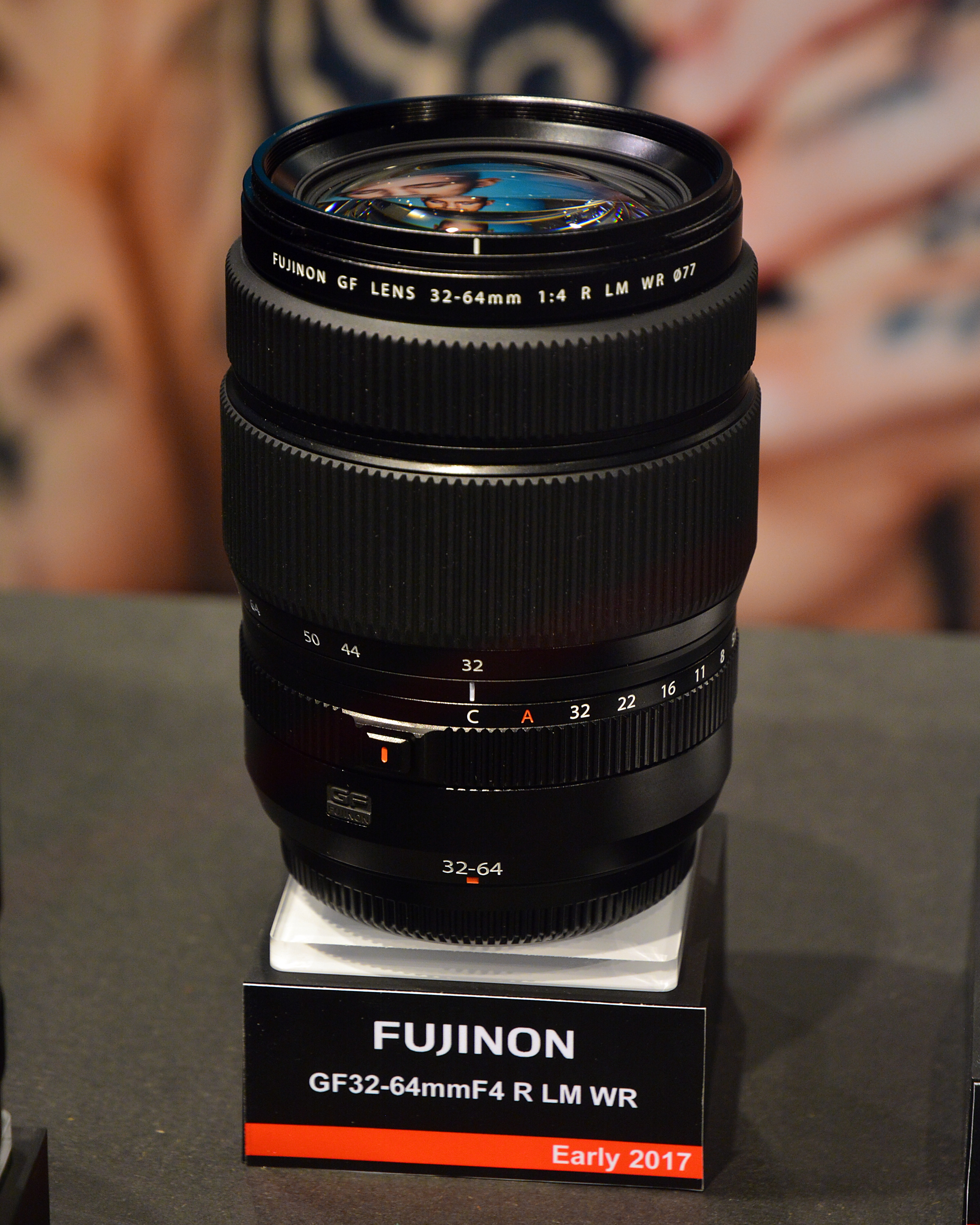
Fujinon GF 32–64 mm F4 R LM WR lens

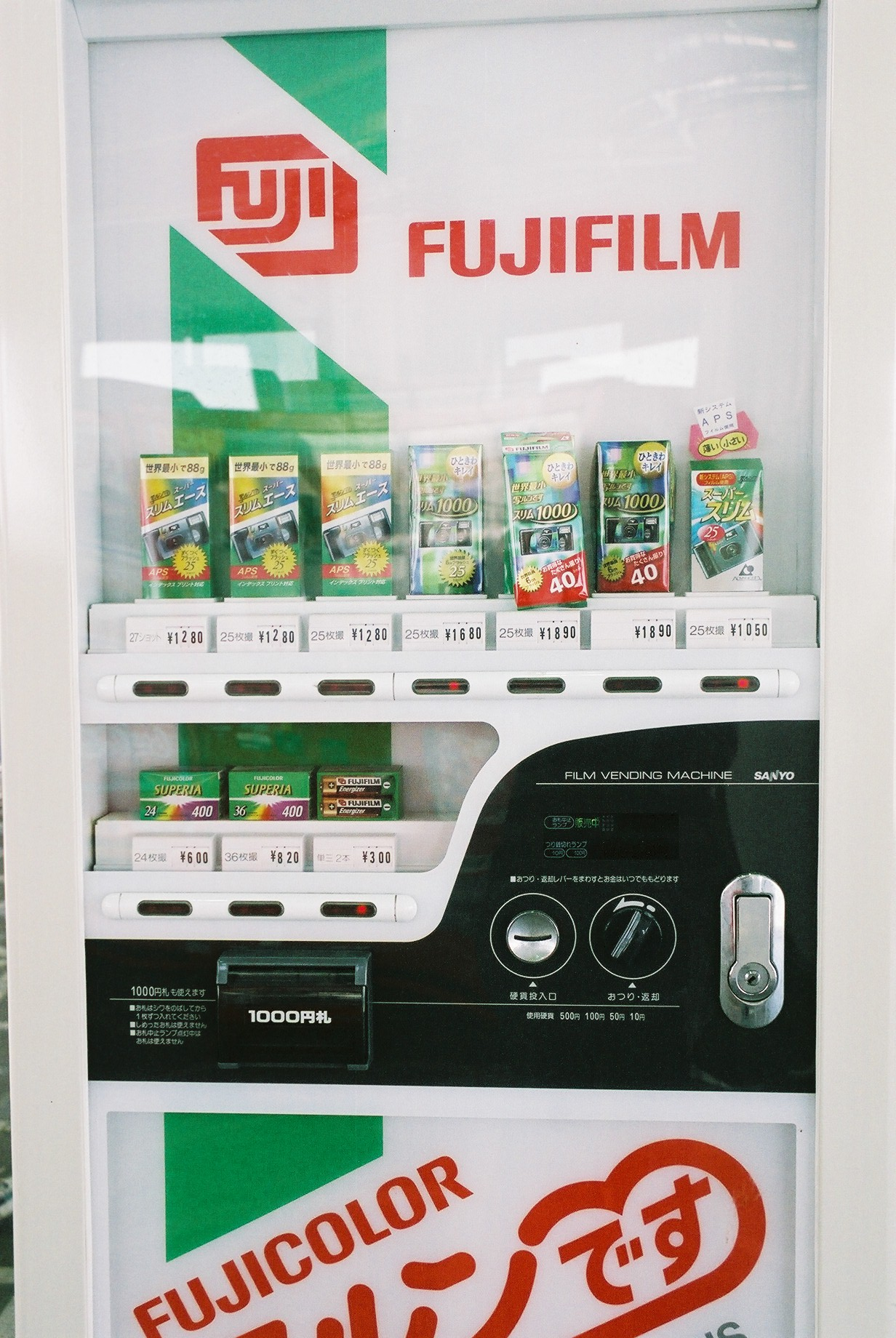
Fujifilm products in a film vending machine in Japan

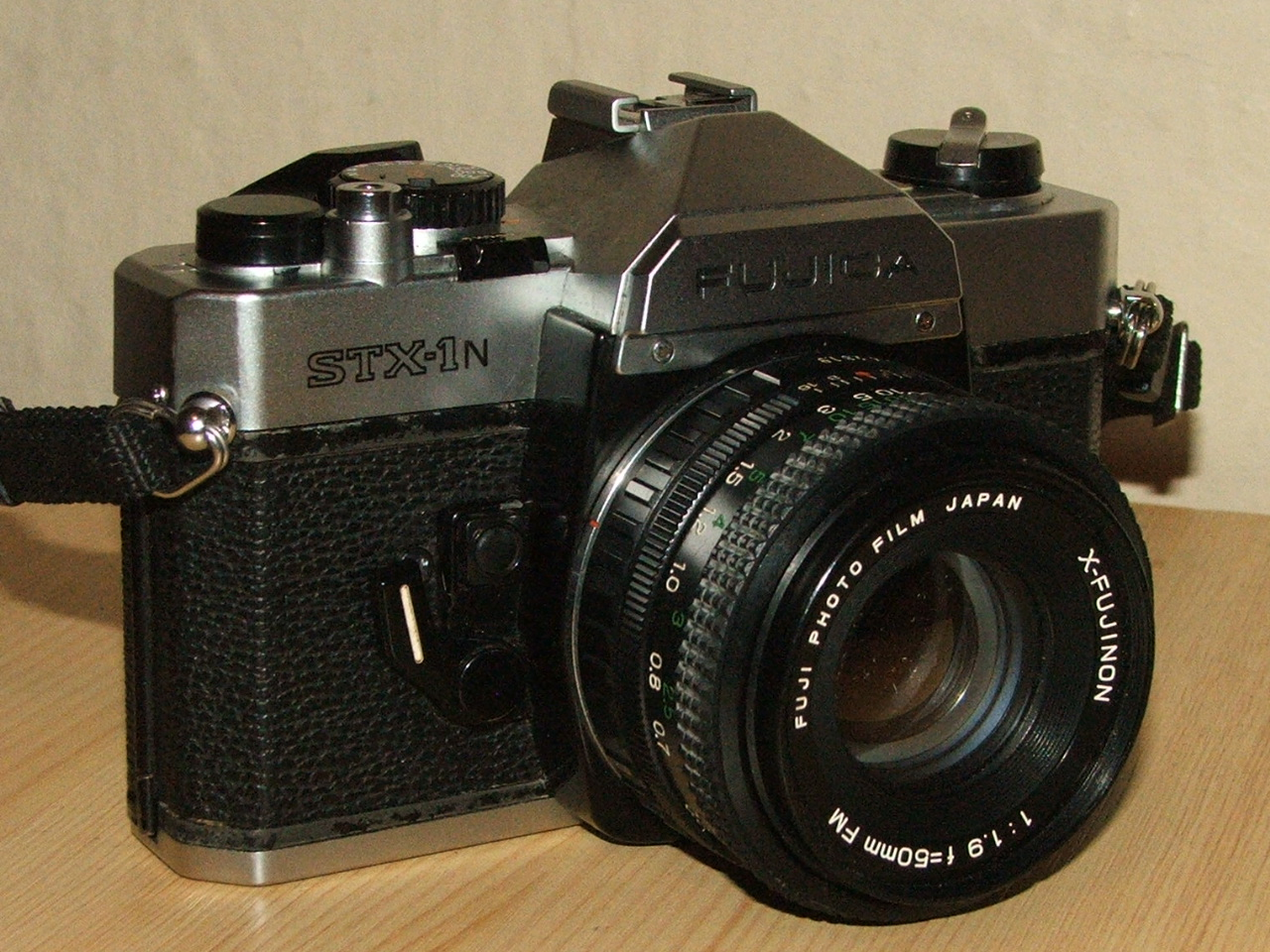
Fujifilm Fujica STX-1N

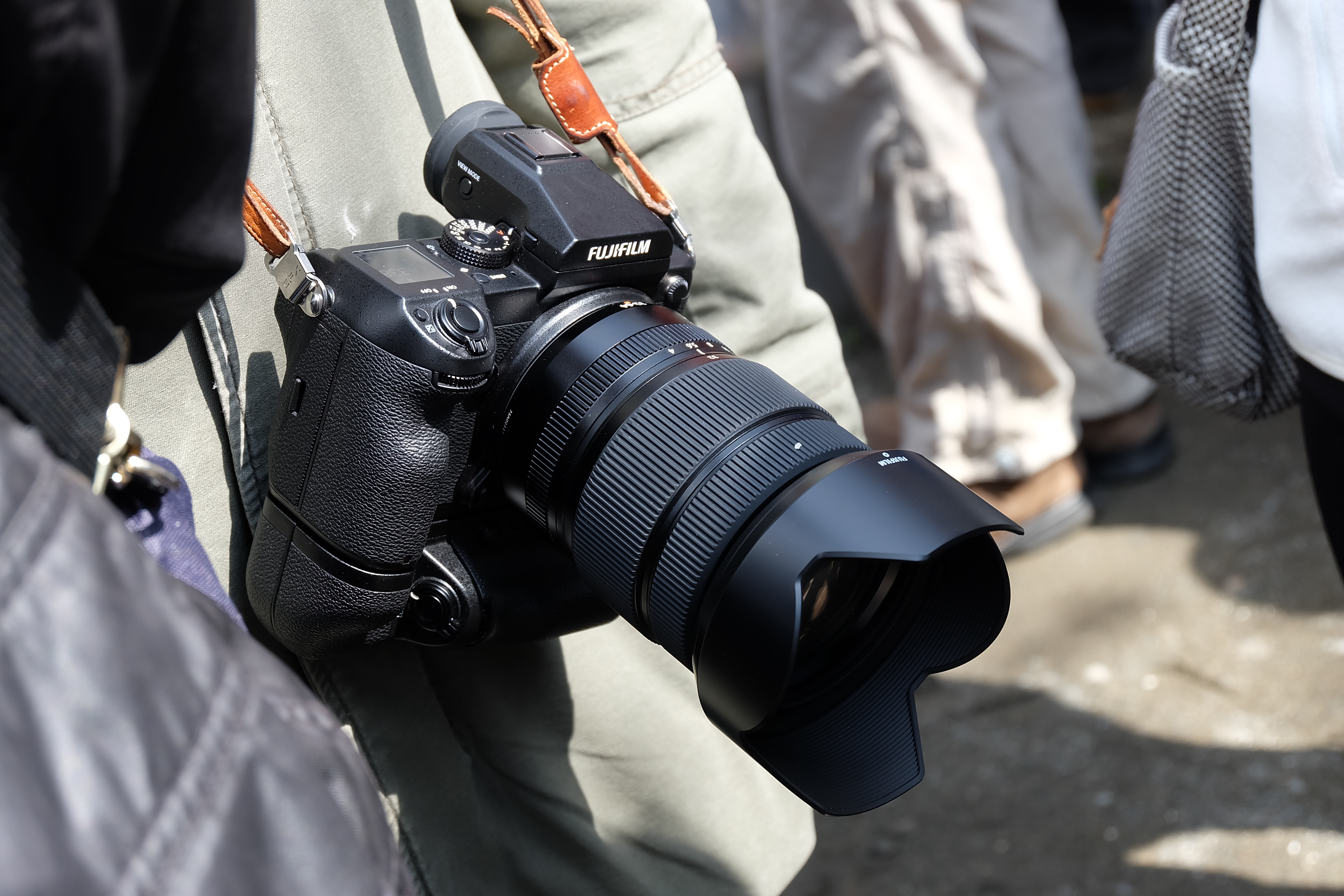
Fujifilm GFX 50S

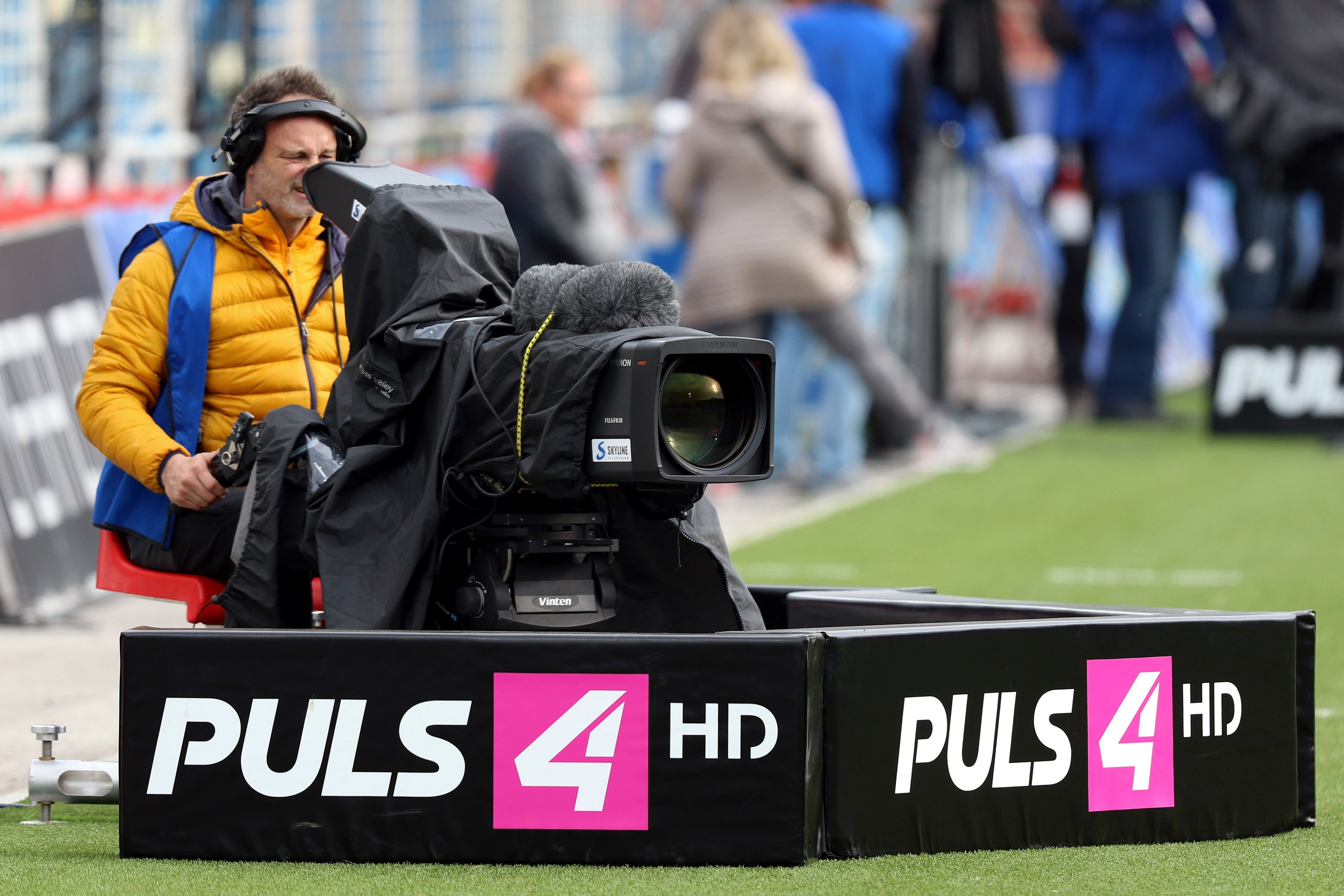
A Fujifilm television lens

== See also ==
- Fujifilm FinePix
- Fujifilm cameras
- List of photographic equipment makers
- List of photographic films
- List of discontinued photographic films
