= Vaio =

Japanese personal computer manufacturer

VAIO Corporation

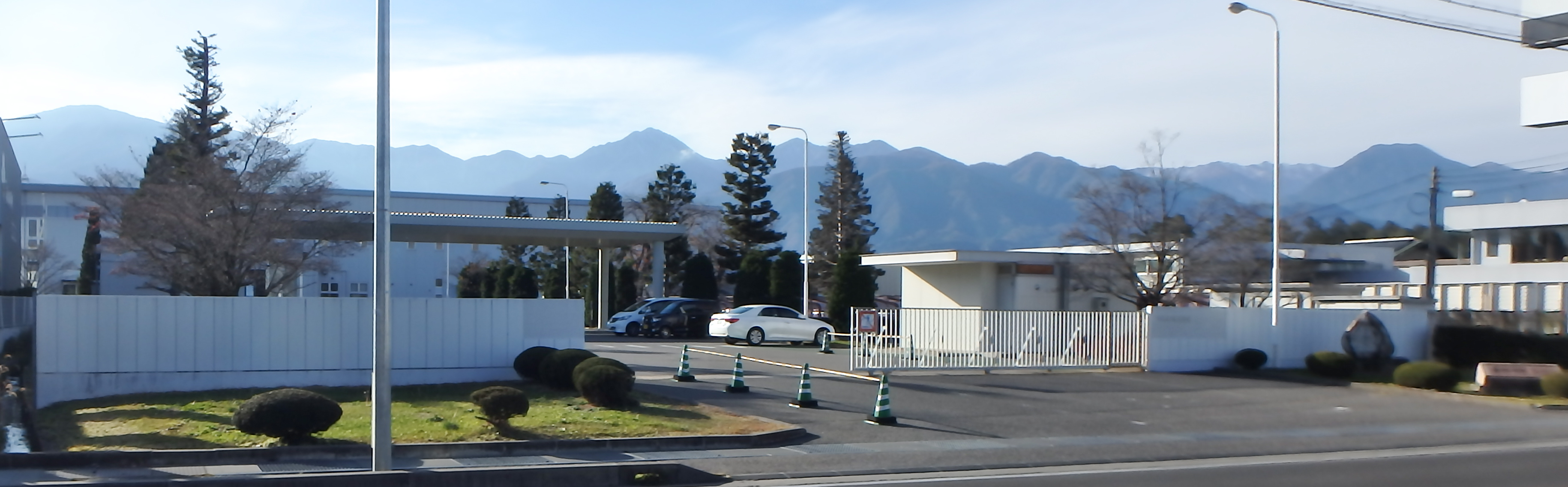
- VAIO headquarters in Nagano Prefecture
- Native name: VAIO株式会社
- Type: Subsidiary
- Industry: Computer; Electronics
- Founded: September 1996; 30 years ago
- Founder: Sony
- Headquarters: Azumino, Nagano, Japan
- Area served: Worldwide
- Products: Personal computers
- Owners: Nojima (93.7%); Sony (4.7%)
- Website: vaio.com

VAIO Corporation (VAIO 株式会社, Baio Kabushiki Kaisha; English: /ˈvaɪ.oʊ/), known simply as VAIO or Sony VAIO, is a Japanese personal computer manufacturer headquartered in Azumino, Nagano Prefecture.

Vaio began as a brand of Sony, introduced in 1996, until it was offloaded into an independent company in 2014, with Japan Industrial Partners (JIP) purchasing the VAIO business while Sony maintained a minority stake. Sony still holds the intellectual property rights for the VAIO brand and logo.

In 2025, JIP completed the sale of its 91.40% stake in VAIO to Nojima. As of November 2026, the company operates in several countries, including Argentina, Brazil, Chile, Japan, Mexico and the United States.

== Etymology ==
Originally an acronym of "Video Audio Input Output", the "VAIO" name was later amended to "Video Audio Integrated Operation", and later to "Visual Audio Intelligent Organizer" to celebrate the brand's 10th anniversary. The logo, along with the first of the VAIO computers, were designed by Teiyu Goto, supervisor of product design from the Sony Creative Center in Tokyo. He incorporated many meanings into the logo and acronym: the pronunciation in both English (VAIO) and Japanese (バイオ) sounds similar to "bio", which is symbolic of life and the product's future evolution. The name is also alphabetically close to "violet", which is why most early Vaio products were purple or included purple components. Additionally, the logo is stylized to make the "VA" look like a sine wave and the "IO" like binary digits 1 and 0, the combination representing the merging of analog and digital signals. The sound some Vaio models make during startup is derived from the melody created when pressing a telephone keypad to spell the letters V-A-I-O.

== Global operations ==
As of 2023, Vaio is operational in the following countries:

- Argentina
- Brazil
- Chile
- China
- India
- Japan
- Malaysia
- Mexico
- Singapore
- Taiwan
- United States
- Uruguay

== History ==
=== As part of Sony ===
Although Sony made computers in the 1980s, such as MSX-based HitBit computers mainly for the Japanese market, the company withdrew from the computer business around the beginning of the 1990s. Under the then-new VAIO brand, Sony's re-entry into the global computer market began in 1996. Sony's then-president Nobuyuki Idei thought "there was no point making an ordinary PC", so the VAIO lineup was to focus on audio-visual capabilities (as the VAIO name suggests), portability, and design.

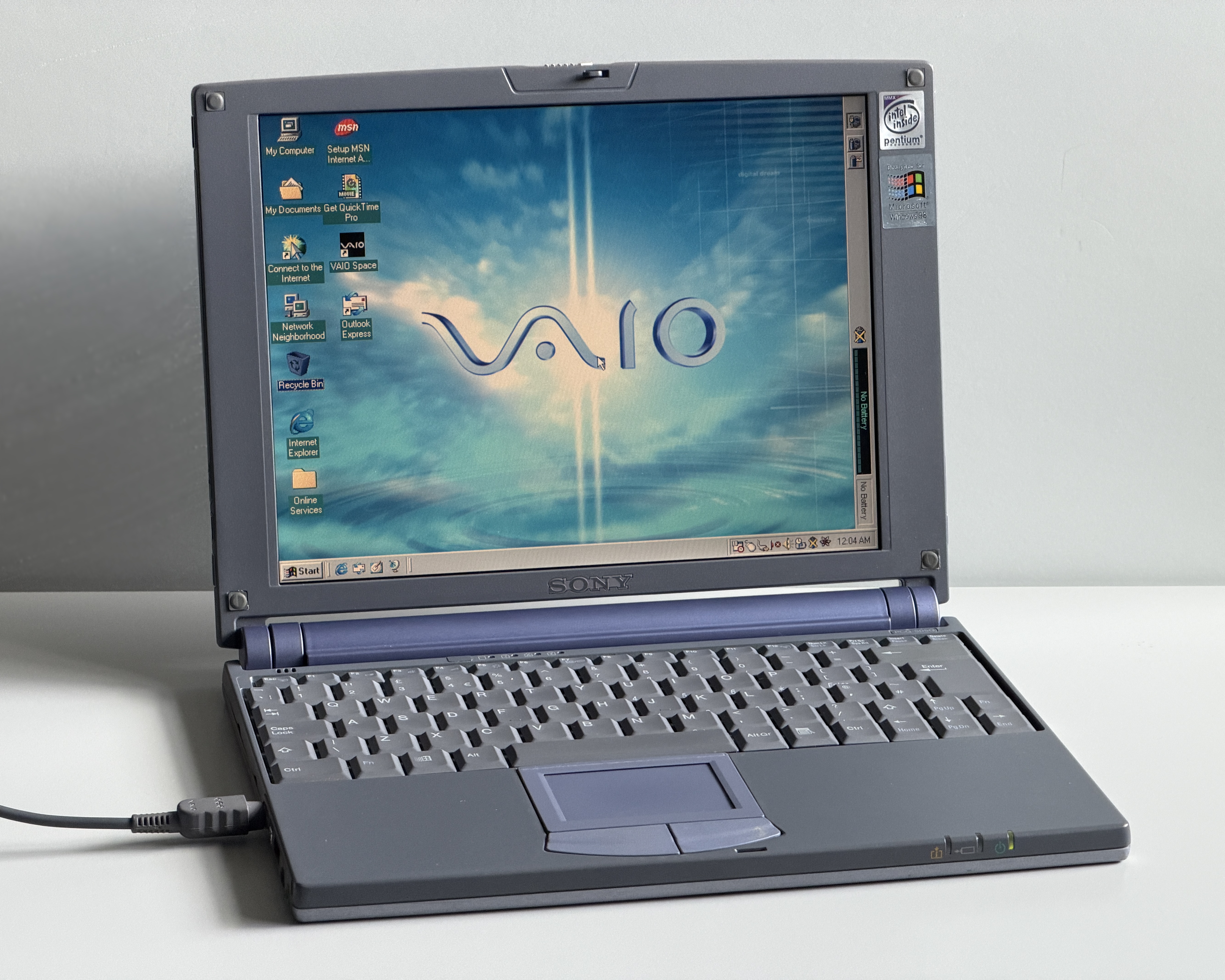
Sony VAIO PCG-505 "SuperSlim"

The PCV-90 was the first series of desktops introduced in 1996, and designed with a 3D graphical interface as a novelty for new users. The first VAIO laptop computers followed in 1997 with the US$2,000 PCG-505 "SuperSlim" model, constructed out of a four-panel magnesium body. VisualFlow was a Sony program distributed in the late 1990s and early 2000s with Sony VAIO computers.

Over the years, many audio visual technologies and interfaces pioneered by Sony became a key focus for its VAIO computers, including Memory Stick, i.Link, and even MiniDisc.

In 2001, Steve Jobs presented a VAIO PC running Mac OS to Sony executives, suggesting the possibility of collaboration. Sony's VAIO team ultimately turned down the proposal they regarded as a "diversion of resources", as the popularity of the Windows-based premium PC brand was growing.

Sony VAIO released later designs (2011 and later) during a period of low PC sales. They included models with innovations such as magnetized stands. The VAIO Tap, which was designed with a completely separate keyboard. The latest models were complemented by the Windows 8 operating system.

=== Spin-off from Sony ===
On 4 February 2014, Sony announced that it was selling its VAIO PC business due to poor sales. Sony created VAIO, a special purpose company with investment firm Japan Industrial Partners, as part of its restructuring effort to focus on mobile devices. In March 2014, it was announced that Japan Industrial Partners had purchased a 95% stake in the VAIO division.

The sale closed on 1 July 2014. On the same day, the company announced refreshed entries in the VAIO Fit and Pro lines. They initially distributed the relaunched products in Japan, then later in Brazil. In August 2015, VAIO announced plans to re-enter international markets, beginning with Brazil and the United States. VAIO CEO Yoshimi Ota stated that the company planned to focus more on high-end products in niche segments (such as the creative industries), as they felt Sony was somewhat too focused on attempting to garner a large market share in its PC business. The Z Canvas tablet was released in the United States on 5 October 2015, through Microsoft Store and the VAIO website. On 16 October 2015, VAIO agreed to introduce their products in Brazil through a partnership with a local manufacturer Positivo Informática.

On 2 February 2016, VAIO announced that it would unveil a Windows 10 smartphone. Also that month, it was also reported that VAIO was negotiating with Toshiba and Fujitsu Technology Solutions to consolidate their personal computer businesses together.

On 4 June 2018, Nexstgo Company announced that they would be licensed by VAIO to oversee the business in Asia. This license agreement between Hong Kong–based Nexstgo and the Japan-based VAIO would include manufacturing, sales and marketing as well as servicing of VAIO laptops under the VAIO trademark in the Hong Kong, Macau, Malaysia, Singapore and Taiwan markets.

Currently in the US, VAIO business products are sold by Canon USA.

On November 11, 2024, a major Japanese electronics retailer named Nojima announced it will acquire VAIO for ¥11.2 billion. It will purchase about 93% of the Japan Industrial Partners's stake while Sony will retain a 4.7% stake. The deal was completed on January 6, 2025 with VAIO becoming a subsidiary of Nojima.

== Products ==
=== Sony VAIO (1996 to 2014) ===
Sony's VAIO brand included product lines across notebooks, subnotebooks, desktops, media centres, and even Network media solutions.

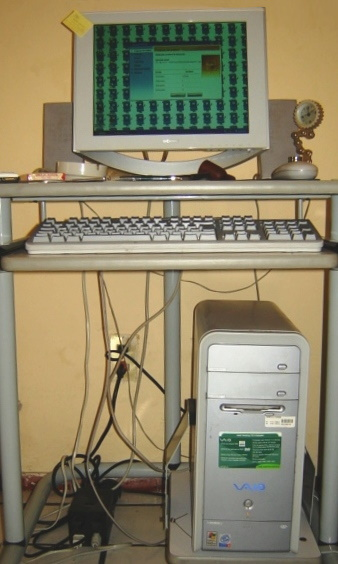
Sony VAIO PCV-RS desktop

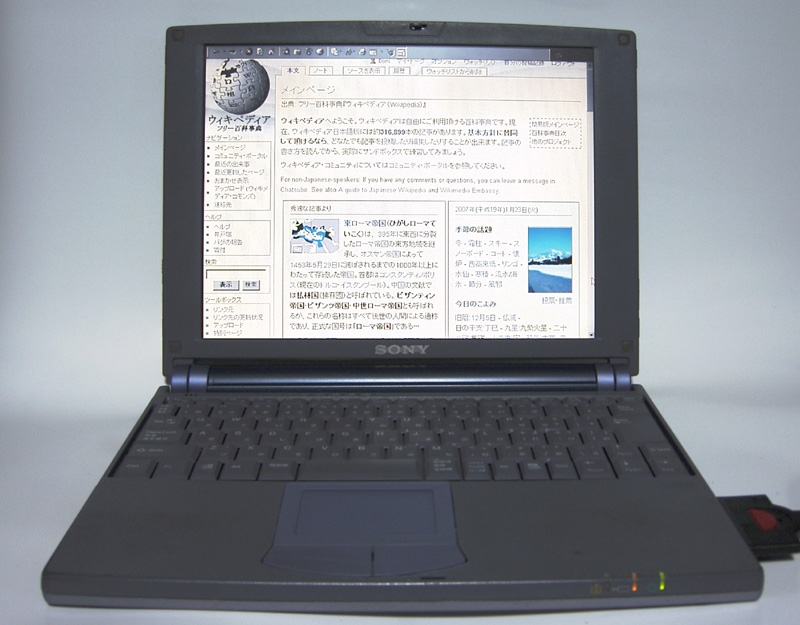
Sony VAIO 505GX

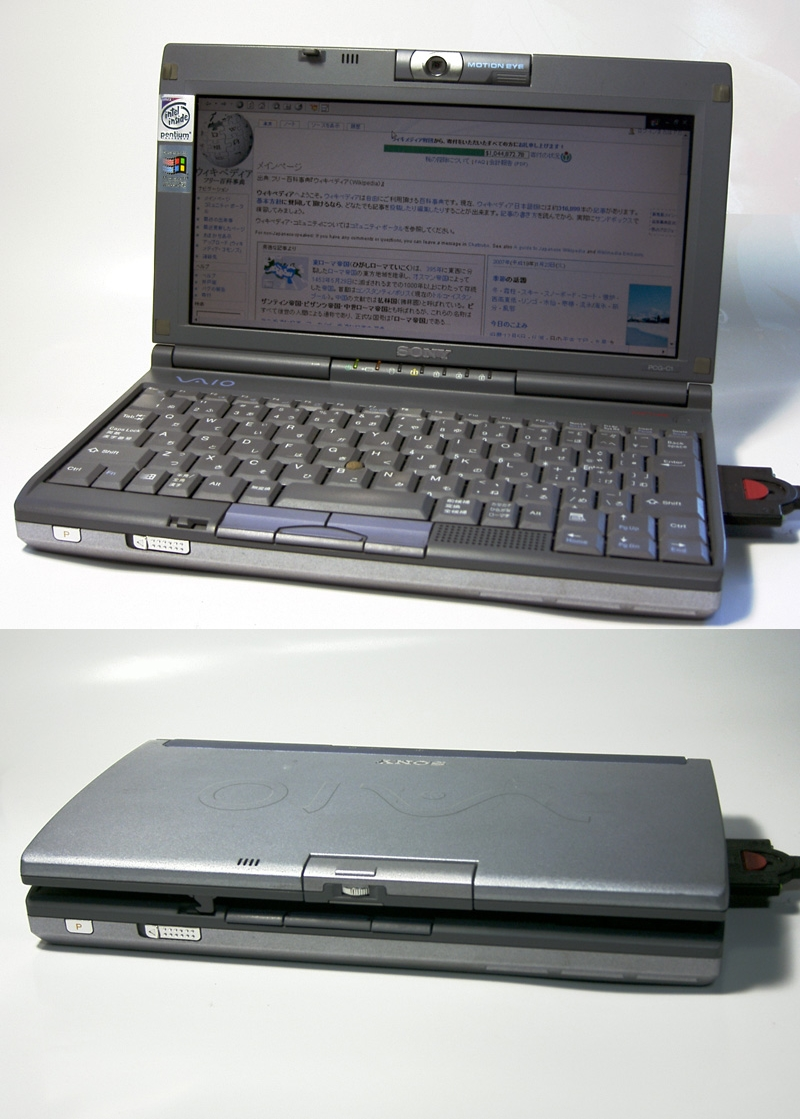
An early Sony VAIO C1 PictureBook

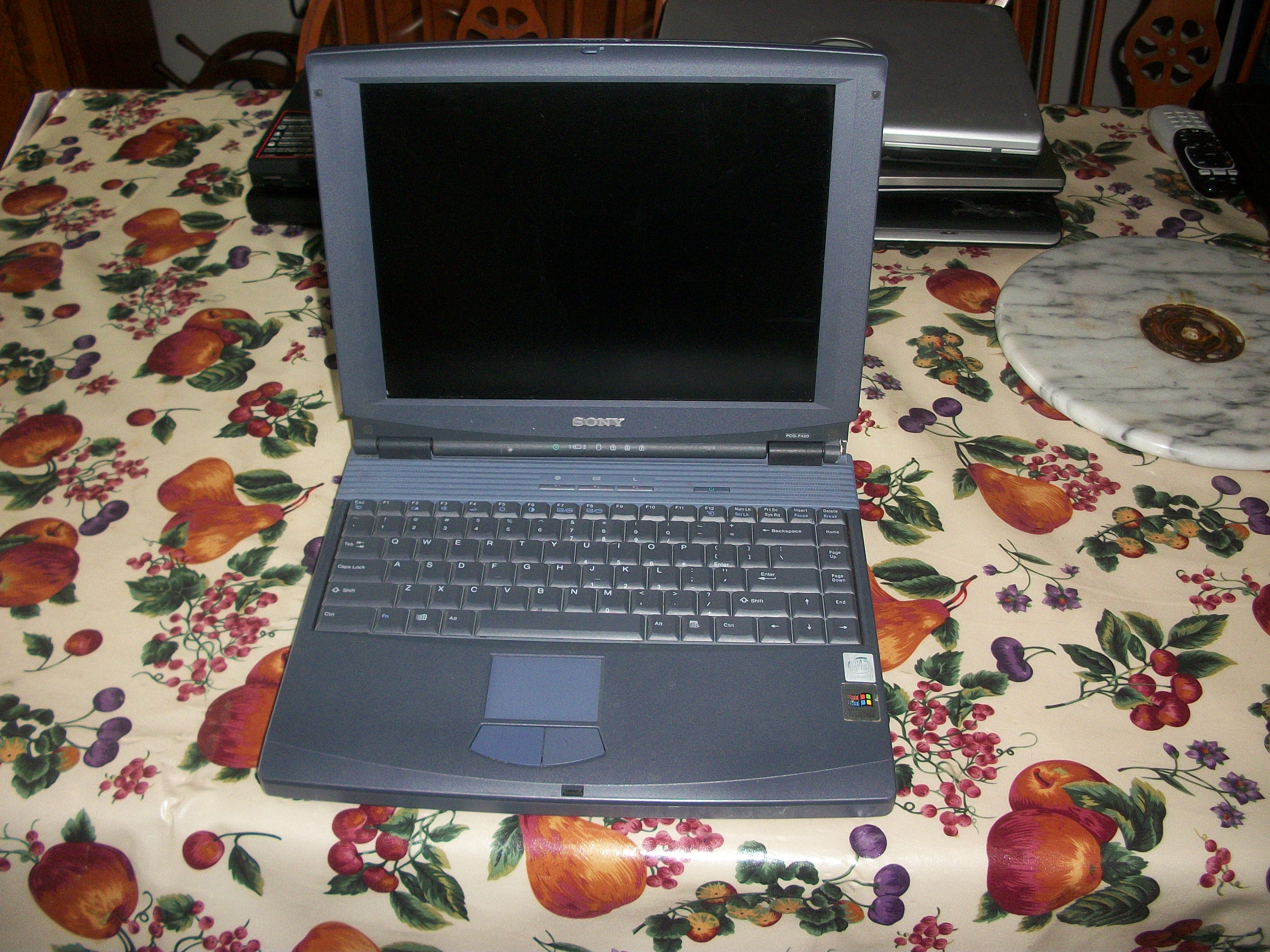
Sony VAIO PCG-F420 notebook from ~1999-2000

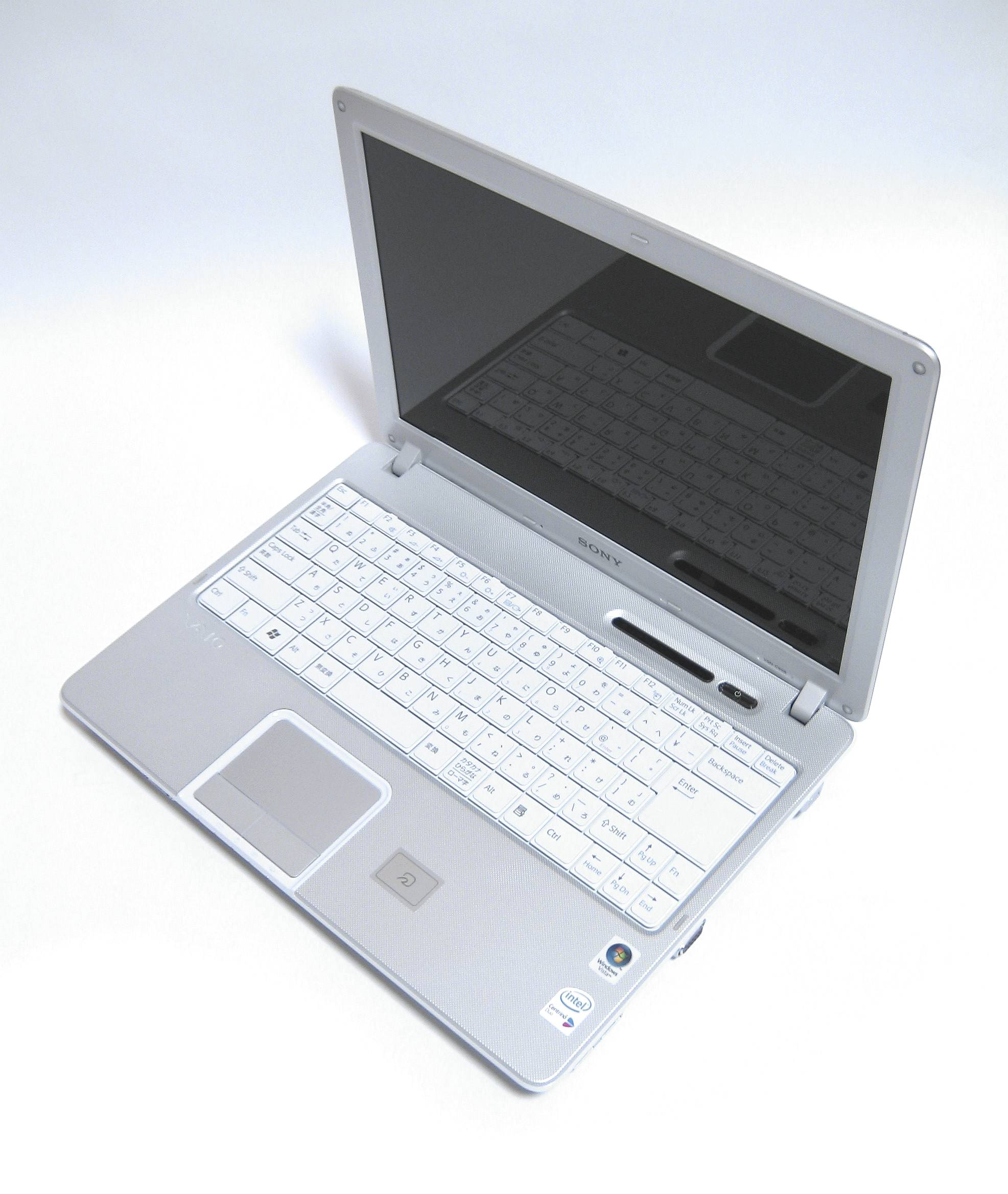
Sony VAIO C series

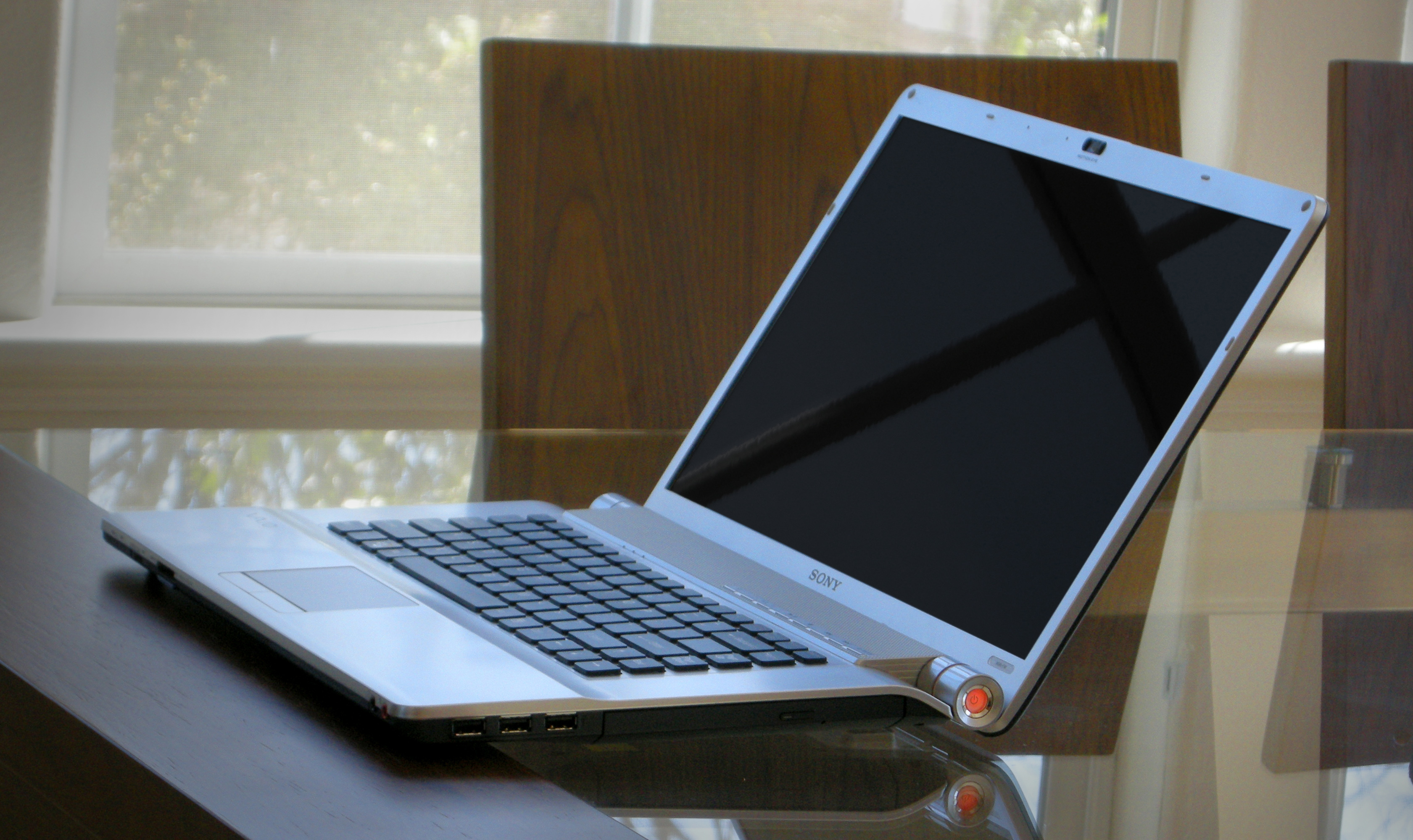
Sony VAIO FW series (2009)

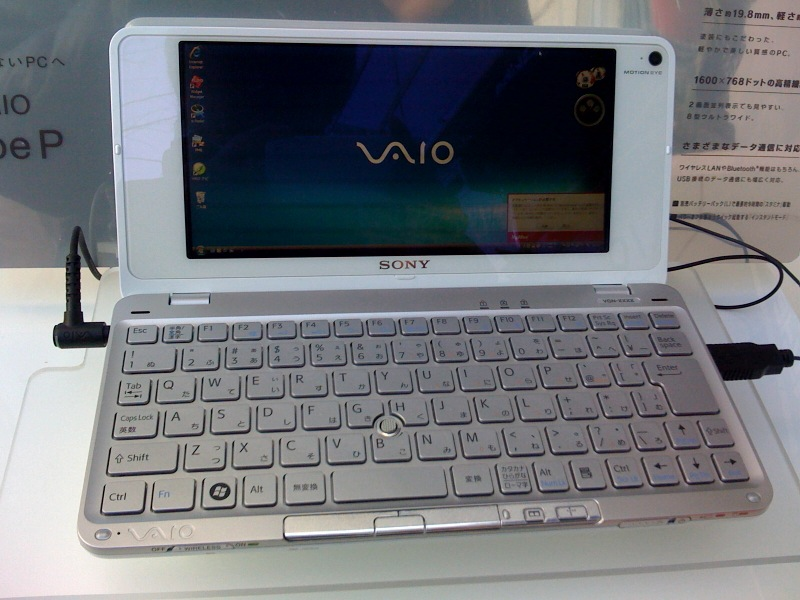
Sony VAIO P series (2009)

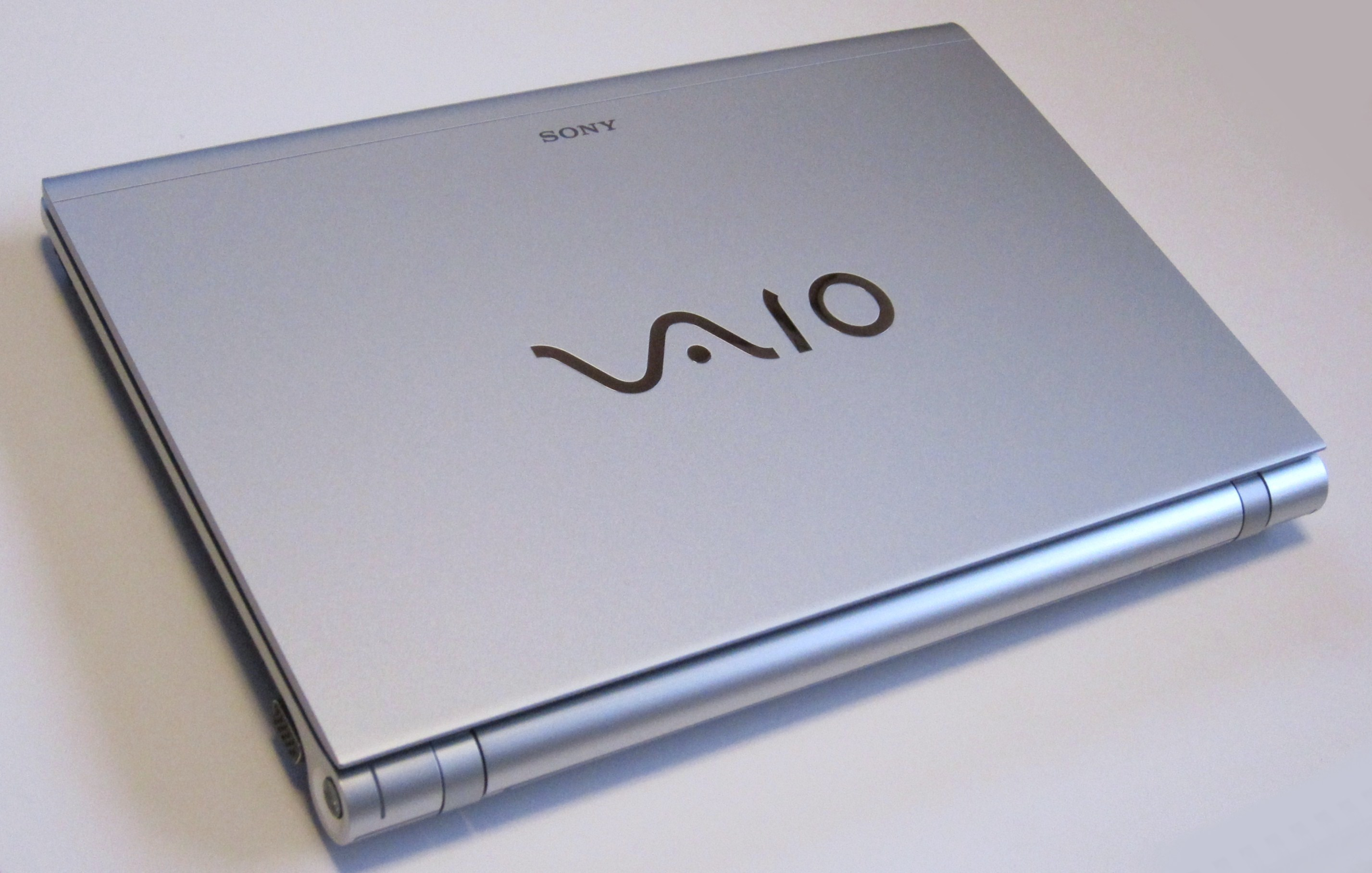
Sony VAIO Z series (3rd Generation)

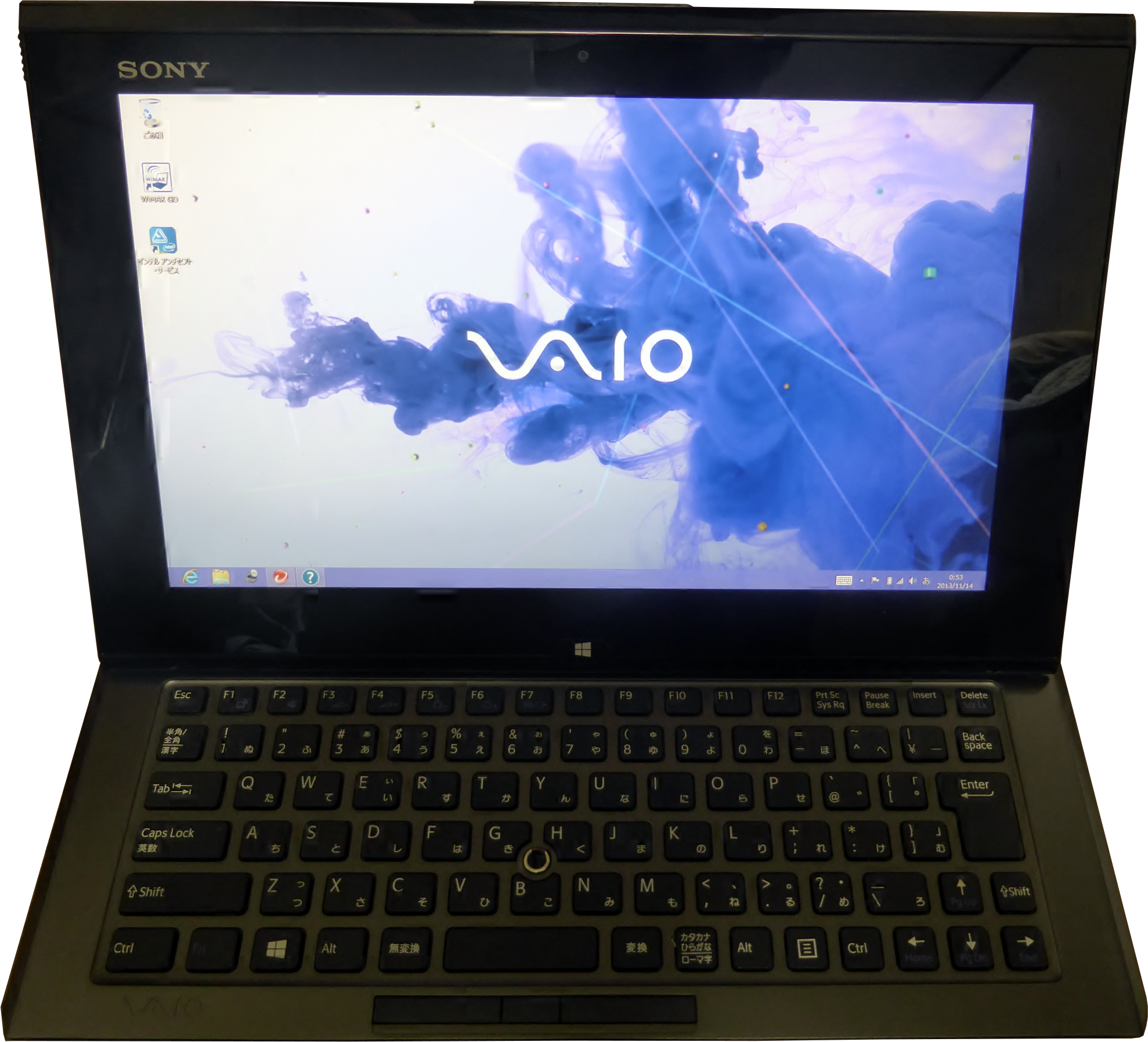
Sony VAIO Duo 11 (2012)

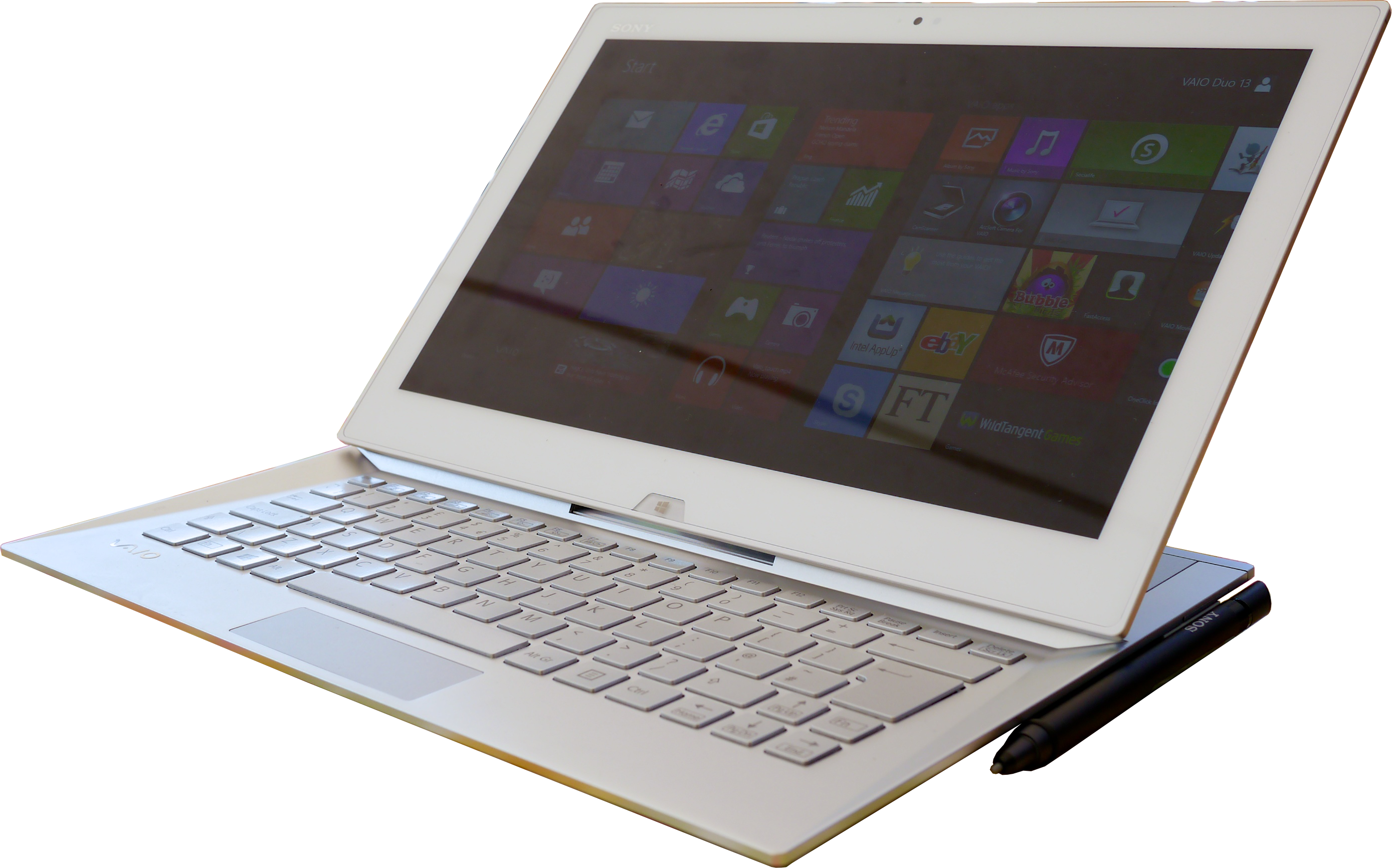
Sony VAIO Duo 13 (2013)

==== Computers ====
Sony's VAIO range of computers consisted of the following lineups:

===== Desktops =====
- Desktops
  - PCV series (1996–2005)
- Multimedia Desktops
  - PCV-M series (1998–1999)
  - PCV-MX series (2000, built-in FM radio, MiniDisc player and amplifier)
- Tablet PC Desktops
  - PCV-LX series (2000–2008)
- Media Center PCs (Note: Living Room PCs that shipped without displays)
  - VGX-XL series (2005, audio receiver form factor)
  - VGX-TP series (2007, cylindrical disc form factor)
  - VGC-R series (2006)
- All-In-One Computers
  - PCV-W series (2002–2006)
  - VGC-VA series (2005–2006, 20", integrated TV tuner)
  - L series (2006–2013, 15.4" or 19" touchscreen display, integrated TV tuner, Sony's Living Room PC)
  - Tap 20 (2013, 20" touchscreen display)
  - Tap 21 (2014, 21.5" 1920 x 1080 touchscreen display)

===== Notebooks =====
- Ultraportable Premium
  - 505 series (1997–2004, 10.4" or 12.1" display, external floppy and CD drives, originally called SuperSlim)
  - 700 series (1997–1998, 12.1" display, external floppy and CD drives)
  - 800 series (1998–1999, 13.3" display, external floppy and CD drives)
  - TX series (2005–2007, 11.1" 1366 x 768 display, first laptop with 16:9 LED backlit display)
  - TZ series (2007–2008, 11.1" 1366 x 768 display)
  - TT series (2008–2010, 11.1" 1366 x 768 display)
  - SZ series (2006–2008, 13.3" 1280 x 800 display, switchable graphics (Note: On the SZ series, switching between integrated and discrete graphics required a restart of the PC))
  - Z series (2008–2014, 13.1" display, switchable graphics (Note: On the Z series, switching between integrated and discrete graphics does not require a restart of the PC))
- Ultraportable Mainstream
  - SR series (2000-2001, 10.4" SVGA display, circular trackpad)
  - SRX series (2001-2002, 10.4" 1024 x 768 display, circular trackpad)
  - TR series (2003, 10.6" 1280 x 768 display)
  - VX series (2002, 10.4" or 12.1" display)
  - SR series (2008–2010, 13.3" 1280 x 800 display)
  - S series (2010–2013, 13.3" 1600 x 900 display)
  - T series (2012–2014, 13.3" 1366 x 768 display)
  - Y series (13.3" 1366 x 768 display, no optical drive)
- Ultraportable Netbooks
  - G series (2007, 12.1" 1024 x 768 display, Intel Core processor)
  - M series (2008, 10.1" 1024 x 600 display, Intel Atom processor)
  - W series (2009, 10.1" 1366 x 768 display, Intel Atom processor)
  - X series (11.1" 1366 x 768 display, Intel Atom processor)
- Consumer, Home & Work
  - F series (1999–2000, 13.0" or 14.1" 1024 x 768 display, desktop replacement)
  - FX/FXA (Note: FXA models of FX series computers had AMD processors) series (2001–2003, 14.1" display, desktop replacement)
  - XG/XE/XR (Note: sold as the XG series in the US/Canada, XE series internationally, XR series in Japan) series (1999–2001, 13.3" or 14.1" 1024 x 768 display, modular DVD/CD-RW/Floppy/2nd battery/2nd hard drive bay)
  - QR series (2001, 13.3" 1024 x 768 display)
  - FRV series (2003, 15" 1024 x 768 display, desktop replacement)
  - GR series (2002, 15" 1400 x 1050 display, desktop replacement, swappable multi-bay)
  - GRX series (2002, 15" 1024 x 768 or 16.1" 1600 x 1200 display, desktop replacement)
  - GRZ series (2003, 15" 1024 x 768 display, desktop replacement)
  - GRT series (2004, 15" 1024 x 768 or 16.1" 1600 x 1200 display, desktop replacement)
  - NV/NVR (Note: NVR models of NV series computers had AMD processors) series (2002-2005, 15" 1024 x 768 or 1440 x 1050 display, modular Floppy/MiniDisc/Numeric Keypad/Compact Subwoofer bay)
  - B series (2004)
  - BX series (2005, 14.1" display)
  - FJ series (2005, 14.1" display)
  - C series (13.3" 1280 x 800 display, choice of colors)
  - CR series (2007, 14.1" 1280 x 800 display, choice of colors)
  - NR series (2007, 15" 1280 x 800 display)
  - E series (2010, 15.5" or 17.3" display, choice of colors)
  - XE series (2011, 15.5" 1920 x 1080 display)
  - Fit 14 & 15 (2013, 14" or 15" touchscreen laptop, SVF)
  - Duo (2013, 13.3" hybrid touchscreen laptop, SVD)
  - Tap 11 (2013, 11.6" touchscreen convertible, SVT)
- Multimedia
  - A series (2004, 17" 1920 x 1200 display)
  - AX series (2005, 17" 1440 x 900 display)
  - AR series (2006, 17" 1440 x 900 or 1920 x 1200 display, first with BD-R drive)
  - AW series (2008, 18.4" 1680 x 945 or 1920 x 1080 display)
- Portable Entertainment
  - FS series (2005–2006, 15.4" 1280 x 800 display)
  - FE series (2006–2007, 15.4" 1280 x 800 display)
  - FZ series (2007–2008, 15.4" 1280 x 800 display)
  - FW series (2008–2010, 16.4" 1920 x 1080 display)
  - F series (2010, 16.4" 1920 x 1080 display)
  - NW series (2009, 15.4" 1366 x 768 display)
- Lifestyle & UMPC Subnotebooks
  - C1 series (1998–2003, 8.9" 1024 x 480 display, branded as PictureBook)
  - GT series (2001, Japan only, 6.4" display, built-in digital camera)
  - U series (2002–2004, 6.4" or 7.1" 1024 x 768 display, Sony's first UMPC)
  - UX series (2006, 4.5" 1024 x 600 display)
  - P series (2009–2010, 8" 1600 x 768 display)

==== Experience ====
Included as part of the out-of-box experience are prompts to register at Club VAIO, an online community for VAIO owners and enthusiasts, which also provides automatic driver updates and technical support via email, along with exclusive desktop wallpapers and promotional offers. From 1997 to 2001 in Japan, the SAPARi program was also pre-installed on VAIO machines. On later models, the customer is also prompted to register the installed trial versions of Microsoft Office 2010 and the antivirus software (Norton AntiVirus on older models, and McAfee VirusScan or TrendMicro on newer ones) upon initial boot.

Vaio computers come with components from companies such as Intel processors, Seagate Technology, Hitachi, Fujitsu or Toshiba hard drives, Infineon or Elpida RAM, Atheros and Intel wireless chipsets, Sony (usually made by Hitachi) or Matsushita optical drives, Intel, NVIDIA or AMD graphics cards and Sony speakers. Recent laptops have been shipped with Qimonda RAM, HP speakers with Realtek High Definition Audio Systems, and optional Dolby Sound Room technology.

A selection of media centres were added to the VAIO range in 2006. These monitorless units (identified by a product code prefixed by VGX rather than VGN) are designed to form part of a home entertainment system. They typically take input from a TV tuner card, and output video via HDMI or composite video connection to an ideally high-definition television. The range included the XL and TP lines. The VGX-TP line is visually unique, featuring a circular, 'biscuit-tin' style design with most features obscured behind panels, rather than the traditional set-top box design.

In 2013, Sony VAIO's range comprised seven products. The most basic were the E, T and S series while the high end models, the F and Z Series, were discontinued. Sony also had a range of hybrid tablet computers, with models called VAIO Duo 11/13, VAIO Tap 11/20 and VAIO Fit multi-flip, as well as a desktop computer under the L series. These models use Windows systems and Intel processors, as described above.

==== Portable music players ====
Sony released some of their early digital audio players (DAP) under the VAIO line. The first model, the "VAIO Music Clip", was released in 1999, powered by an AA battery and featuring 64 MB of internal memory. It differed from Sony's players in the "Network Walkman" line, which used external Memory Stick medium at the time. Succeeding models were also released, but it was mainly sold domestically, with Walkman-branded players more widespread internationally. In 2004 the brand made a comeback with the VAIO Pocket (model VGF-AP1L), featuring a 40 GB hard disk drive for up to 26,000 songs, and a 2.0-inch color LCD. Like Walkman DAPs it used SonicStage software.

==== Music streamers ====
Sony had also released several other products under the VAIO lineup, including the VAIO WA1 wireless digital music streamer, essentially a portable radio and speaker.

=== VAIO (2014 to present) ===
The current and past lineup of VAIO computers continues the same product line naming, and currently include:

- VAIO Z
- VAIO SX14
- VAIO SX12
- VAIO FH14
- VAIO FE14
- VAIO FE15
- VAIO F14
- VAIO F16
- VAIO S13
- VAIO S15

==== Z Canvas ====
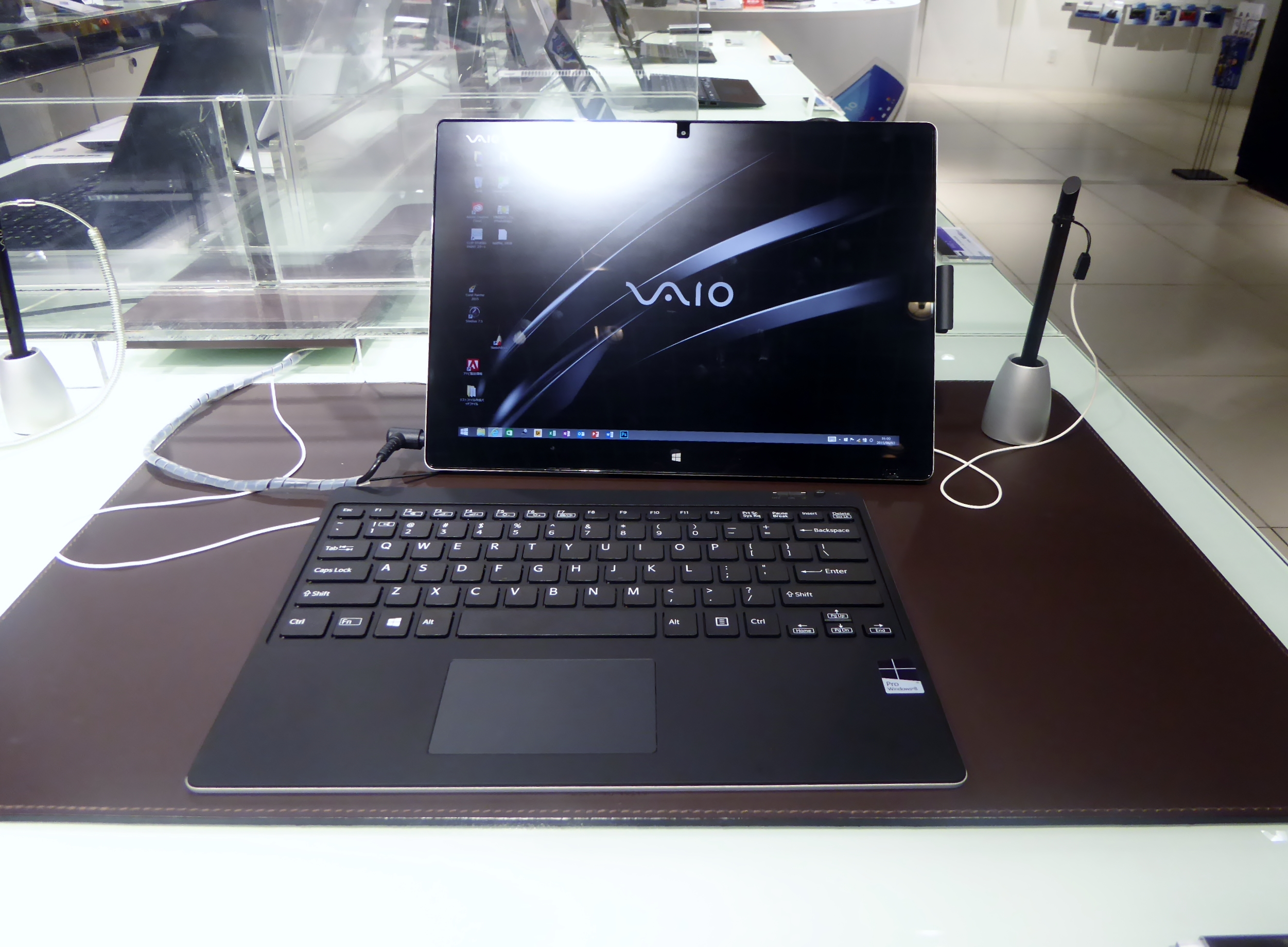
VAIO Z Canvas (2015)

The first new VAIO computer developed by VAIO was the VAIO Z Canvas 2-in-1 PC, which began sales on 23 September 2015 starting from $2,199 in the USA. The Z Canvas is focused on creative professionals as its target audience. Graphic artists, illustrators, animators, etc. With a 12.3-inch LCD WQXGA+ 2560 x 1704 IPS multi-touch display with digitizer stylus (pen) capability, the Z Canvas looks similar in design to the Microsoft Surface Pro 3, but comes with Windows 10 Pro and is available as a Microsoft Signature PC. It has an Intel Core i7 processor, an Intel Iris Pro Graphics 5200, a 2nd generation PCIe SSD with PCIe Gen.3 compatibility (up to 1 TB) or SATA/M.2 for the 256 GB model, and up to 16 GB of memory.

==== Smartphones ====
In February 2016, VAIO announced the VAIO Phone Biz—a premium built mid-range Windows 10 Mobile device. This was VAIO's first Windows smartphone. In March 2017, VAIO announced VAIO Phone A, which had the look of the VAIO Phone Biz, but runs the Android operating system instead.

== Technology ==
=== Innovations ===
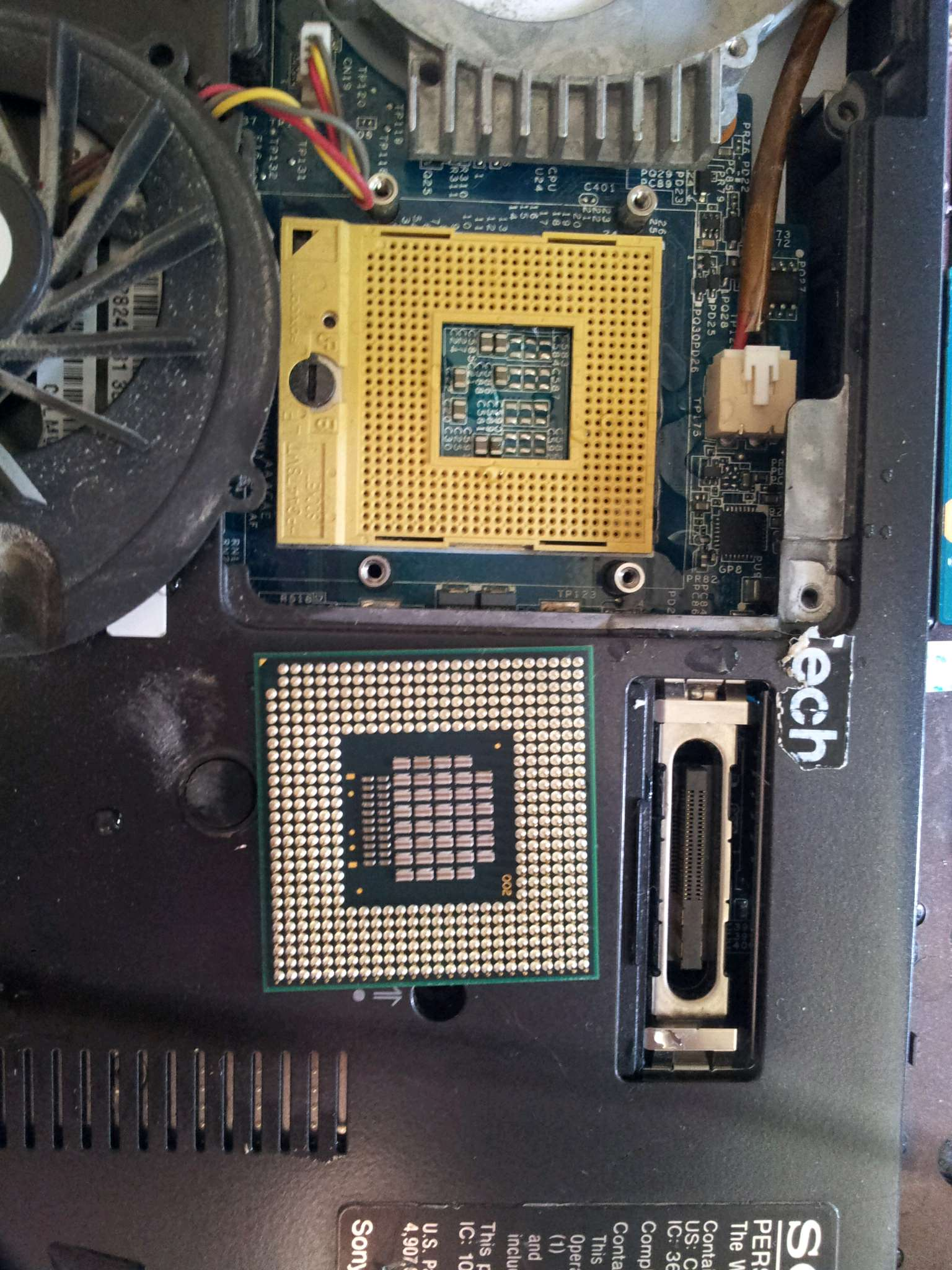
Inside of VGN-C140G laptop

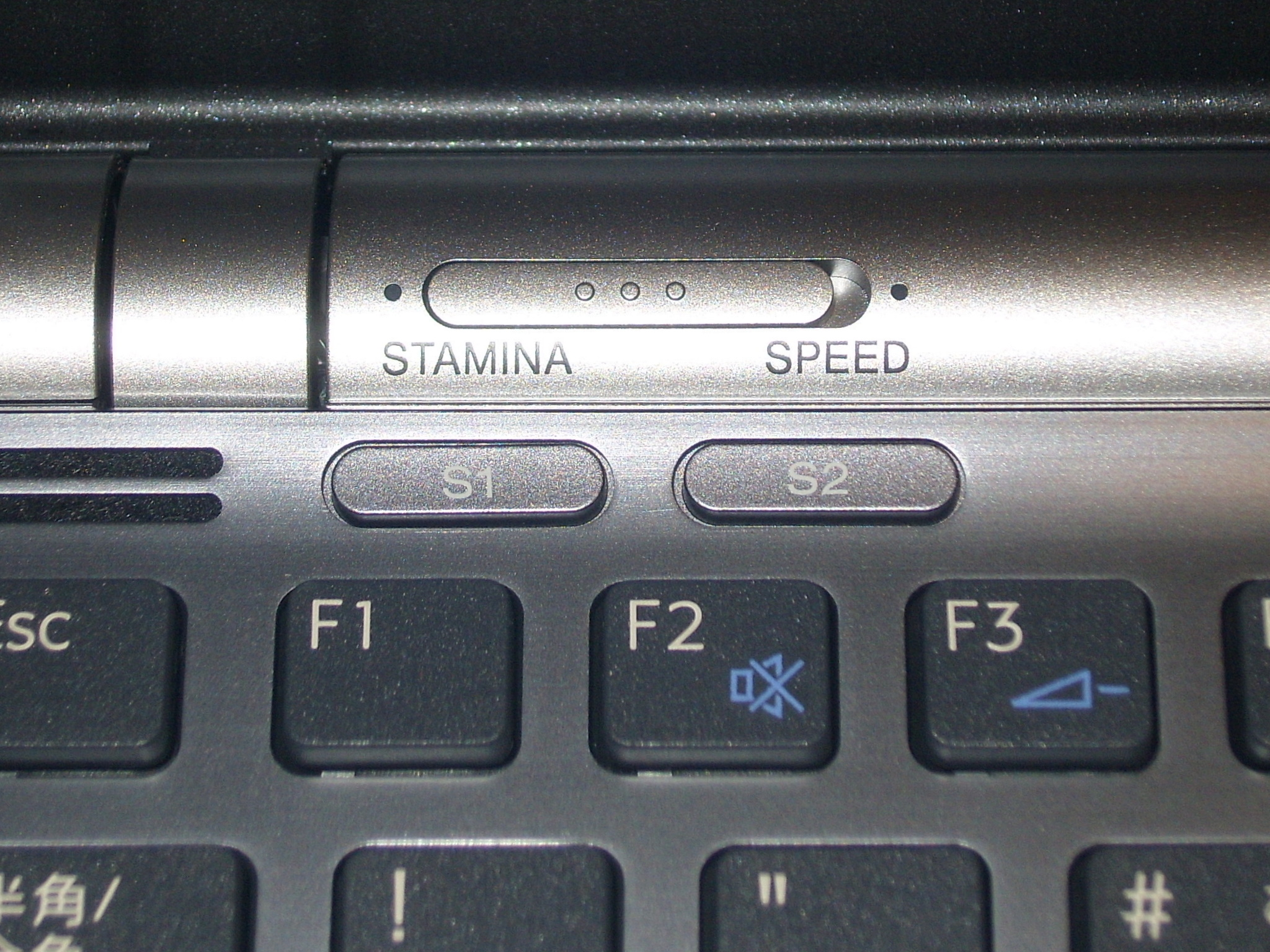
Sony Vaio Z series (2008) keyboard and switch buttons

Over the years, the Sony VAIO lineup has been responsible for many 'firsts' in desktops and laptops, as well as for setting trends for what would now be considered standard equipment.

==== Integrated webcam ====
The Sony VAIO C1 PictureBook subnotebook, first released in 1998, was among the first to feature a built in web-cam, at 0.27 megapixels, and could swivel around to capture photos on both sides.

==== Chiclet keyboards ====
The Sony VAIO X505 laptop, released in 2004, popularized the chiclet keyboard in laptops.

==== Displays ====
Some Sony VAIO models come with Sony's proprietary XBRITE (known as ClearBright in Japan and the Asia-Pacific region) displays. The first model to introduce this feature was the Vaio TR series, which was also the first consumer product to utilize such technology. It is a combination of smooth screen, anti-reflection (AR) coating and high-efficiency lens sheet. Sony claims that the smooth finish provides a sharper screen display, the AR coating prevents external light from scattering when it hits the screen, and the high-efficiency lens sheet provides 1.5 times the brightness improvement over traditional LCD designs. Battery life is also extended through reduced usage of the LCD backlight. The technology was pioneered by Sony engineer Masaaki Nakagawa, who is in charge of the Vaio TR development.

The TX series, introduced in September 2005, was the first notebook to implement a LED back-lit screen, which provides lower power consumption and greater color reproduction. This technology has since been widely adopted by many other notebook manufacturers. The TX series was also the first to use a 16:9 aspect ratio screen with 1366x768 resolution. The successor to the TX series was the TZ series in May 2007. This new design featured an optional 32 or 64GB Solid State Drive (SSD) for rapid boot-up times, quicker application launches and greater durability. If selected, a 250 GB Hard Drive could also have been included in place of the built-in CD/DVD drive to provide room for additional storage. For security, this model included a biometric fingerprint sensor and Trusted Platform Module. The TZ offered a built-in highly miniaturized Motion Eye camera built into the LCD panel for video conferencing. Additional features included the XBRITE LCD, integrated Wireless Wide Area Network (WWAN) technology and Bluetooth technology.

==== Switchable graphics ====
The SZ series was the first to use switchable graphics – the motherboard contained an Intel GMCH (Graphics Memory Controller Hub) featuring its own in-built graphics controller (complete memory hub controller and graphics accelerator on the one die) and a separate NVIDIA graphics accelerator chipset directly interfaced with the GMCH. The GMCH could reduce power consumption and extend battery, life whereas the NVIDIA chipset provided greater graphics processing power. A mechanical switch toggled between the graphics options but required that the user preselect the mode to use before the motherboard could initialize. The Z series, which replaced the SZ series, can change graphics modes "on the fly" on Windows Vista, and does not require a restart of the system. This feature has subsequently been used by other manufacturers, including Apple, Asus and Alienware.

==== Blu-ray ====
The AR Series was the first to incorporate a Blu-ray Disc burner, at the height of the Blu-Ray vs. HD-DVD format war. This series was designed to be the epitome of high-definition products including a 1080p capable WUXGA (1920 × 1200 pixels) screen, HDMI output and the aforementioned Blu-ray burner. The AR series also includes an illuminated logo below the screen. Blu-ray/HDMI capable models have been the subject of intense promotion since mid-2007, selling with a variety of bundled Blu-ray Discs. The AR series was subsequently replaced by the AW series, and in 2011, replaced by the F Series, which incorporates all of these features in a 16.4" 16:9 display.

=== Startup Chime ===
The chime heard when a VAIO computer is booted are the DTMF notes corresponding to V-A-I-O (8-2-4-6) dialed on a telephone keypad.

=== Bundled Software ===
Sony has been criticized for loading its VAIO laptops with bloatware, or ineffective and unrequested software that supposedly allows the user to immediately use the laptop for multimedia purposes. This includes trial versions of Adobe Premiere Elements & Adobe Photoshop Elements with VAIO Media Gate and XMB. Sony later offered a "Fresh start" option in some regions with several of their business models. With this option, the computer is shipped only with a basic Windows operating system and very little trial software already installed.

The default webcam software in Vaio notebooks is ArcSoft WebCam Companion. It offers a set of special effects called Magic-i visual effects, through which users can enhance the images and videos taken through the webcam. It also features a face detection feature. Certain other Sony proprietary software such as Click to Disc Editor, VAIO Music Box, VAIO Movie Story, VAIO Media Plus are also included with recent models. Those shipped with ATI Radeon video cards feature the Catalyst Control Centre, which enables control of brightness, contrast, resolution etc., and also enables connection to an external display.

=== Recovery Media ===
Early Sony VAIO models included recovery media in the form of CDs and/or DVDs.

Beginning in mid-2005, a hidden partition on the hard drive, accessible at boot via the BIOS or within Windows via a utility was used instead. Pressing [F10] at the Vaio logo during boot-up will cause the notebook to boot from the recovery partition; where the user has the choice of either running hardware diagnostics without affecting the installed system, or restoring (re-imaging) the hard drive to factory condition – an option that destroys all user installed applications and data). The first time a new VAIO PC is started up, users are prompted to create their own recovery media. This physical media would be required in case of hard disk failure and/or replacement. In cases where the system comes with Windows 7 64-bit pre-installed, the provided recovery media restores the system to Windows 7 32- or 64-bit.

== See also ==
- Sony NEWS
- Splashtop covers VAIO Quick Web Access.
