= Sony Vaio 800 series =

The Sony Vaio 800 series was a range of Vaio laptops launched in 1998. It was produced until early 1999.

== Technical specifications ==
The line-up featured a 13.3" 1024×768 LCD screen that fit into the same weight and thickness as the company's 700 series, which had a smaller 12.1" screen (2.4 kg without optical drive or floppy drive, 2.7 kg with optical drive). Like the 700 series, the 800 series featured a removable 3.5" floppy disk and CD-ROM drive and optional docking station. The internal modem was a 56 KB device.

The launch model, the PCG-808, was equipped with a Mobile Pentium II 266 MHz CPU, a 4 GB hard drive, 64 MB of RAM and was priced at $3699. A lower-end 803 model, with a 233 MHz Pentium II, was also sold in Japan. The GPU for all models was the NeoMagic MagicMedia 256 AV with 2.5 MB of RAM.

== Models ==
Model	Screen	CPU	GPU	Memory (RAM)	Storage	Audio	Operating System
PCG-803 (Japan)		Intel Mobile Pentium II 233 MHz	NeoMagic MagicMedia 256 AV with 2.5 MB of RAM.	64 MB	4 GB		
PCG-808	13.3" XGA TFT	Mobile Pentium II 266 MHz	NeoMagic MagicMedia 256 AV with 2.5 MB of RAM.	64 MB SDRAM	4 GB	16-bit CD-quality stereo sound with built-in 3D stereo speakers and microphone	Windows 98 / Windows 2000 / Windows ME
PCG-812	13.3" XGA TFT	Mobile Pentium II 233 MHz	NeoMagic MagicMedia 256 AV with 2.5 MB of RAM.		4 GB	16-bit CD-quality stereo sound with built-in 3D stereo speakers and microphone	Windows 98 / Windows 2000
PCG-818		Mobile Pentium II 300 MHz	NeoMagic MagicMedia 256 AV with 2.5 MB of RAM.		6.4 GB		Windows 98 / Windows 2000
PCG-838		Mobile Pentium II 366 MHz	NeoMagic MagicMedia 256 AV with 2.5 MB of RAM.				Windows 98 / Windows 2000 / Windows ME
