= Sony Vaio 505 series =

Line of ultraportable notebook computers

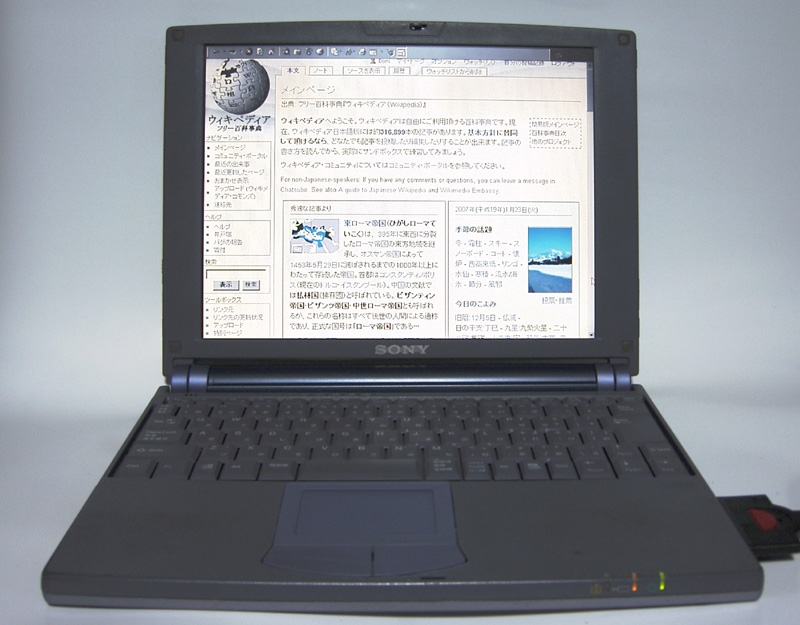
Sony Vaio 505GX

The Sony Vaio 505 (called SuperSlim until 2003) series was a line of ultraportable notebook computers from Sony's VAIO brand. The introduction date in the United States was July 24, 1998.

Hardware specifications at introduction were a 200 MHz ($2000) or 266 MHz ($2700) Pentium MMX CPU, 32 MB RAM, a 2.1 GB hard drive, 10.4" SVGA (800×600) screen, integrated sound, modem, speakers, microphone, PC-Card slot, and optional Firewire port. It also featured a touchpad with additional pen (graphics tablet) functionality. The weight was 3.1 lbs (1.4 kg).

In addition to the 10.4" models, a 12.1" 505 Superslim Pro was introduced in April 1999, weighing 3.75 lbs (1.7 kg), and featuring 1024×768 screen. Starting from the R505 revision (2001), the laptops were supplied with a docking station with integrated CDRW/DVD drive. From R505D onwards, 802.11b wireless was integrated.

The V505 models increased weight and thickness due to the integration of the DVD drive; they were no longer branded 'superslim', as thickness increased from 1 to 1.33", and weight to 4.37 lbs (2 kg).

A one-off X505 model was produced in 2004, with the same screen size (10.4") and 1024×768 resolution as the 1999 models, but with a greatly reduced weight of only 1.73 lbs (822 grams). The case was made with a nickel-carbon alloy. Connectivity was provided by a Fast Ethernet port, unlike previous models, no modem was included, and neither was 802.11 wireless or Bluetooth.

The Sony VAIO X series, launched in 2009, had many design similarities with this product, although an Intel Atom-series processor was used.

== US Models ==
10.4":

- PCG-505 G and GX - July 1998 - launch models, specs above
- PCG-505 F and FX - 233 MHz/266 MHz Pentium MMX, 4.3 GB hard drive, 2 MB NeoMagic MagicGraph graphics September 1998
- PCG-505 TR/TS/TX - 300 MHz Pentium MMX, 6.4 GB hard drive, improved 1024×768 screen, 64 MB RAM - April 1999
- PCG-N505 VE/VX - Celeron/Pentium II 333 MHz, 2.5 MB NeoMagic graphics. July 1999
- PCG-N505SN - Pentium II 400 MHz, 2.5 MB NeoMagic graphics. July 1999
- VGN-X505ZP - ULV Pentium M 1.1 GHz, Intel 855GM graphics, 512 MB RAM, 20 GB hard drive. May 2004

12.1":

- PCG-Z505 S - April 1999, Celeron 333 MHz, 64 MB RAM, 6.4 GB hard disk, 2.5 MB NeoMagic 256AV, Fast Ethernet, RJ-11 modem port
- PCG-Z505 R/RX - July 1999, Pentium II 366/400 MHz
- PCG-Z505 HE/HS - January 2000, Pentium III 450/500 MHz, 64/128 MB RAM, 8.1/12 GB hard disk
- PCG-Z505 JE/JS - April 2000, Pentium III 500/650 MHz, 64/128 MB RAM, 9/12 GB hard disk, 3 MB/6 MB NeoMagic VRAM
- PCG-Z505 LE/LS - September 2000, Pentium III 650/750 MHz, 64/128 MB RAM, 12/20 GB hard disk, ATI Rage Mobility 8 MB SDRAM
- PCG-R505 TL/TE/TS - March 2001, Celeron 650/Pentium III 750/850 MHz, 128 MB RAM, 15/15/20 GB hard drive, Intel 815EM integrated graphics
- PCG-R505 JL/JE/JS - October 2001 Pentium III 750 MHz/850/850 MHz, 128/128/256 MB RAM, 15/20/30 GB hard drive
- PCG-R505D models Pentium III 1.13 GHz, 256 MB RAM, 40 GB hard drive, Intel 830MG graphics, 802.11b wireless
- PCG-R505E models Pentium III 1.13 GHz, 256 MB RAM, 30 GB hard drive
- PCG-R505G models Pentium III 1.2 GHz, 256 MB/512 MB RAM, 30/40/60 GB hard drive
- PCG-V505A models January 2003 Pentium 4-M 1.8/2.0/2.2 GHz, 256/512/1024 MB RAM, 30/40/60 GB hard drive, CDRW/DVD combo, ATI Mobility Radeon 16 MB
- PCG-V505B models Celeron 1.8 GHz/Pentium 4-M 2/2.4 GHz
- PCG-V505D models Pentium 4-M 2.2 GHz, Pentium M 1.4/1.6/1.7 GHz
- PCG-V505E models January 2004 Pentium M 1.5 GHz, ATI Mobility Radeon 9200 32 MB
