= Sony Vaio PCV series =

Desktop computer line, 1996–2005

Sony Vaio PCV Series
- Developer: Sony Corporation
- Manufacturer: Sony Corporation
- Type: Desktop Computer
- Released: 1996; 30 years ago
- Discontinued: 2005; 21 years ago
- Operating system: Microsoft Windows
- CPU: AMD Athlon, Intel Celeron, Intel Pentium, Intel Pentium II, Intel Pentium III, Intel Pentium 4
- Graphics: ATI Rage series, NVIDIA GeForce, RIVA TNT
- Successor: Sony Vaio VGC Series
- Related: Sony Vaio SVL Series, Sony Vaio VGC Series, Sony Vaio VGX Series

Sony Vaio PCV Series is the first line of products of desktop computers introduced by Sony under their VAIO brand in 1996. The series would be introduced to the Japanese market the following year, with the introduction of the mini-tower computer, PCV-T700MR on July 15, 1997.

== History ==
After a long hiatus from building consumer PCs, Sony announced the re-entering into computer manufacturing market with the introduction of the VAIO brand in 1996 while in Japan the following year. Sony's first line-up of VAIO desktop computers, the PCV-70 and PCV-90, would be introduced at the 1996 PC Expo trade show in New York. While in Japan, Sony introduced PCV-T700MR mini-tower computer, and two notebook computers for the Japanese market.

== PCV Line-up ==
The PCV series are broken into various sub-series variants, each focusing on specific consumers that fits their needs. Despite the variants introduced, the PCV series introduced 10 numbered models before adding a suffix to differentiate its future line-up. The letter(s)/suffix that starts before or after the model number indicates which subseries it belongs to. The list below describes each suffix.

=== Subseries Line-up ===
The subseries consists of 18 variants:

- DS series (Digital Studio Series)
- E series (MicroTower series)
- HS series
- HX series
- J series
- JX series
- L series
- LX series
- M series
- MX series
- P series
- R series
- RX series
- RZ series
- S series
- T series
- V series
- W series

Model Number	Processor	Memory	Graphics	Optical Drive	Floppy Drive	Storage Drive	Audio	Operating System	Release date
PCV-70	Intel Pentium (166 MHz, 256 KB Pipeline Burst SRAM )	32 MB EDO RAM (standard), expandable to 128 MB	ATI RAGE 3D (2 MB EDO RAM)	8X CD-ROM	3.5-inch Micro Floppy Disk Drive (1.44 MB)	2.1 GB HD	Yamaha YMF701 with 3-D SRS surround sound, 16-bit audio EM & wavetable synthesis and MPC-3 compliant	Microsoft Windows 95	1996
PCV-90	Intel Pentium (200 MHz, 256 KB Pipeline Burst SRAM)	32 MB EDO RAM (standard), expandable to 128 MB	ATI RAGE 3D (2 MB EDO RAM)	8X CD-ROM	3.5-inch Micro Floppy Disk Drive (1.44 MB)	2.5 GB HD		Microsoft Windows 95	1996
PCV-100	Intel Pentium MMX (166 MHz, 256 KB Pipeline Burst SRAM)	32 MB EDO RAM (standard), expandable to 128 MB	ATI Rage II (2 MB EDO RAM)	16X CD-ROM	3.5-inch Micro Floppy Disk Drive (1.44 MB)	2.5 GB HD		Microsoft Windows 95	1997
PCV-120	Intel Pentium MMX (200 MHz, 256 KB Pipeline Burst SRAM)	32 MB EDO RAM (standard), expandable to 128 MB	ATI Rage II (2 MB EDO RAM)	16X CD-ROM	3.5-inch Micro Floppy Disk Drive (1.44 MB)	3.8 GB HD		Microsoft Windows 95	1997
PCV-130	Intel Pentium MMX (200 MHz, 512 KB Pipeline Burst SRAM)	32 MB SDRAM (standard), Expandable to 256 MB	ATi Rage II+ (4 MB EBO RAM)	24X CD-ROM	3.5-inch drive (1.44 MB)	4.3 GB HD		Microsoft Windows 95	July 1997
PCV-150	Intel Pentium MMX (233 MHz, 512 KB Pipeline Burst SRAM)	32 MB SDRAM (standard), Expandable to 256 MB	ATi Rage II+ (4 MB EBO RAM)	24X CD-ROM	3.5-inch drive (1.44 MB)	4.3 GB HD		Microsoft Windows 95	July 1997
PCV-210	Intel Pentium II MMX (266 MHz, 512 KB Pipeline Burst SRAM)	32 MB SDRAM (standard), Expandable to 384 MB	ATi 3D Rage Pro (4 MB SGRAM)	24X CD-ROM	3.5-inch drive (1.44 MB)	4.3 GB HD		Microsoft Windows 98	1998
PCV-230	Intel Pentium II MMX (300 MHz, 512 KB Pipeline Burst SRAM)	64 MB SDRAM (standard), Expandable to 384 MB	ATi 3D Rage Pro (4 MB SGRAM)	24X CD-ROM	3.5-inch drive (1.44 MB)	6.4 GB HD		Microsoft Windows 98	1998
