= VA10 =

VA-10 has the following meanings:

- State Route 10 (Virginia)
- Virginia's 10th congressional district
- VAIO, a brand of computer products.
