= Sony Vaio F series =

Laptop computer series

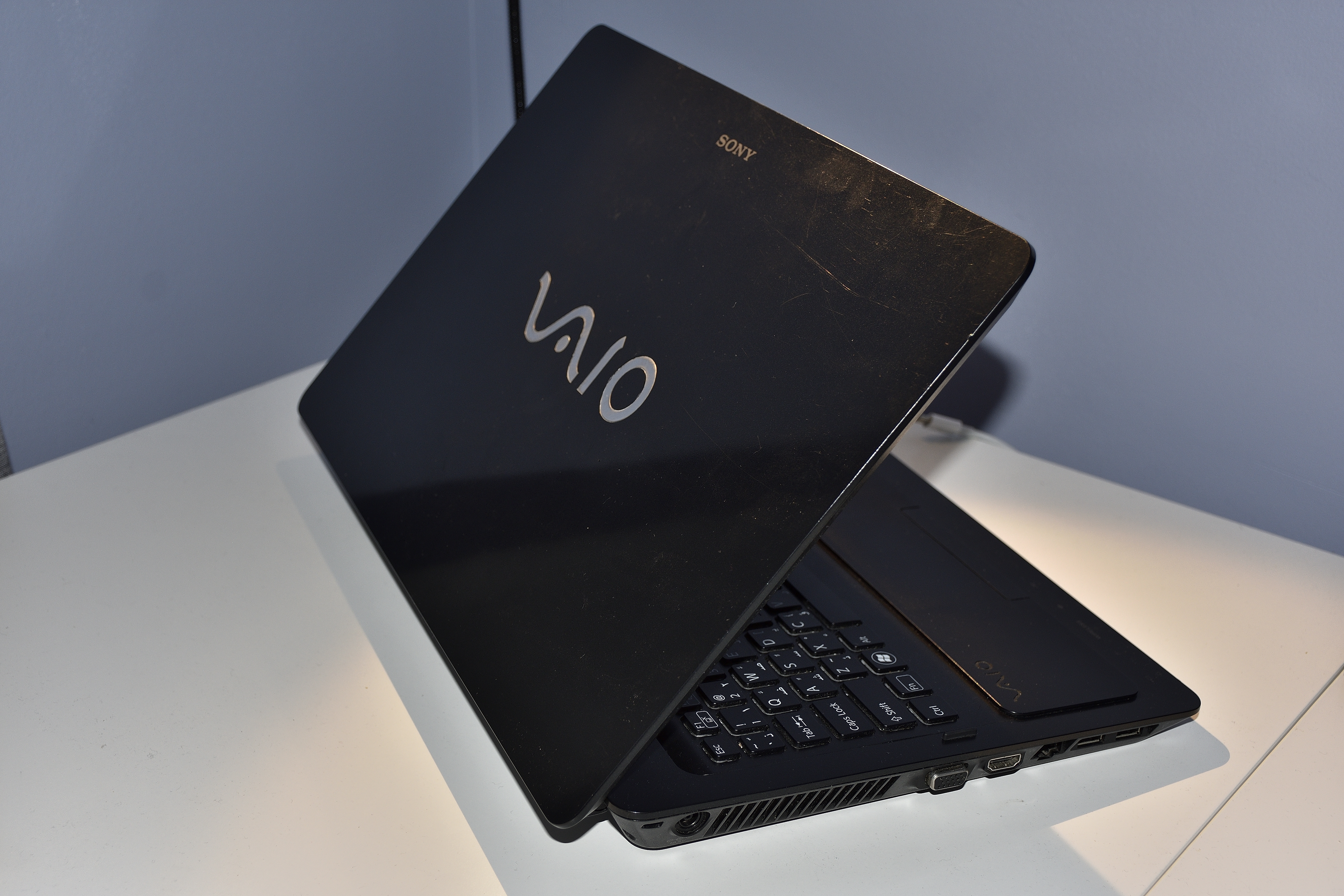
Sony VAIO F-Series VPCF2 laptop computer

The Vaio F series is Sony's multimedia and gaming orientated laptop series. Launched in January 2010, it replaced the Sony Vaio FW series. Like the preceding model, it features a 16.4" screen, but with Full HD 1920 x 1080 resolution, 240 Hz refresh rate (for 3D VPCF2 models), and LED backlight. The model came in two choices (VPCF2), 2D or 3D models. The 3D model is included with 3D glasses.

The VPCF2 machines features a Sandy Bridge Intel Core i5 or i7 CPUs ranging from 2.20 GHz to 3.60 GHz with Intel Turbo Boost, 4 GB, 6 GB, or 8 GB DDR3 RAM, NVIDIA GeForce GT 520M (with 512 MB VRAM), or GT 540M (with 1 GB VRAM) graphics, 500 GB to 750 GB HDD or 512 GB SSD, 802.11b/g/n wireless, Blu-ray read or write drive, Bluetooth 3.0 and Windows 7 Home Premium. It features a LED backlit QWERTY keyboard with a numeric keypad and set of touch media keys by which you can pause, play, skip, stop or switch between media. It also has a Vaio button which launches Media Gallery, an ASSIST button which launches Vaio Care, a 3D button, which converts playing videos to 3D in real time (3D Models only) and a WEB button, which when pressed when the computer is off starts the computer with internet support only without booting Windows.

The VPCF2 is wedge-shaped, almost 2 inches in the rear, tapering off to almost an inch in front, when closed the screen has a slight under bite. The computer as recessed speakers located above the keyboard. The computer was available in premium white, matte black, silver (2D Models), or glossy black (3D Models). It has a VGA Port, an HDMI Port, a microphone in-port, an optical out-speaker port, 2 USB 3.0 ports, a single USB 2.0 port, a gigabit Ethernet port and a 4 pin i-LINK port.

== 1999–2000 model ==
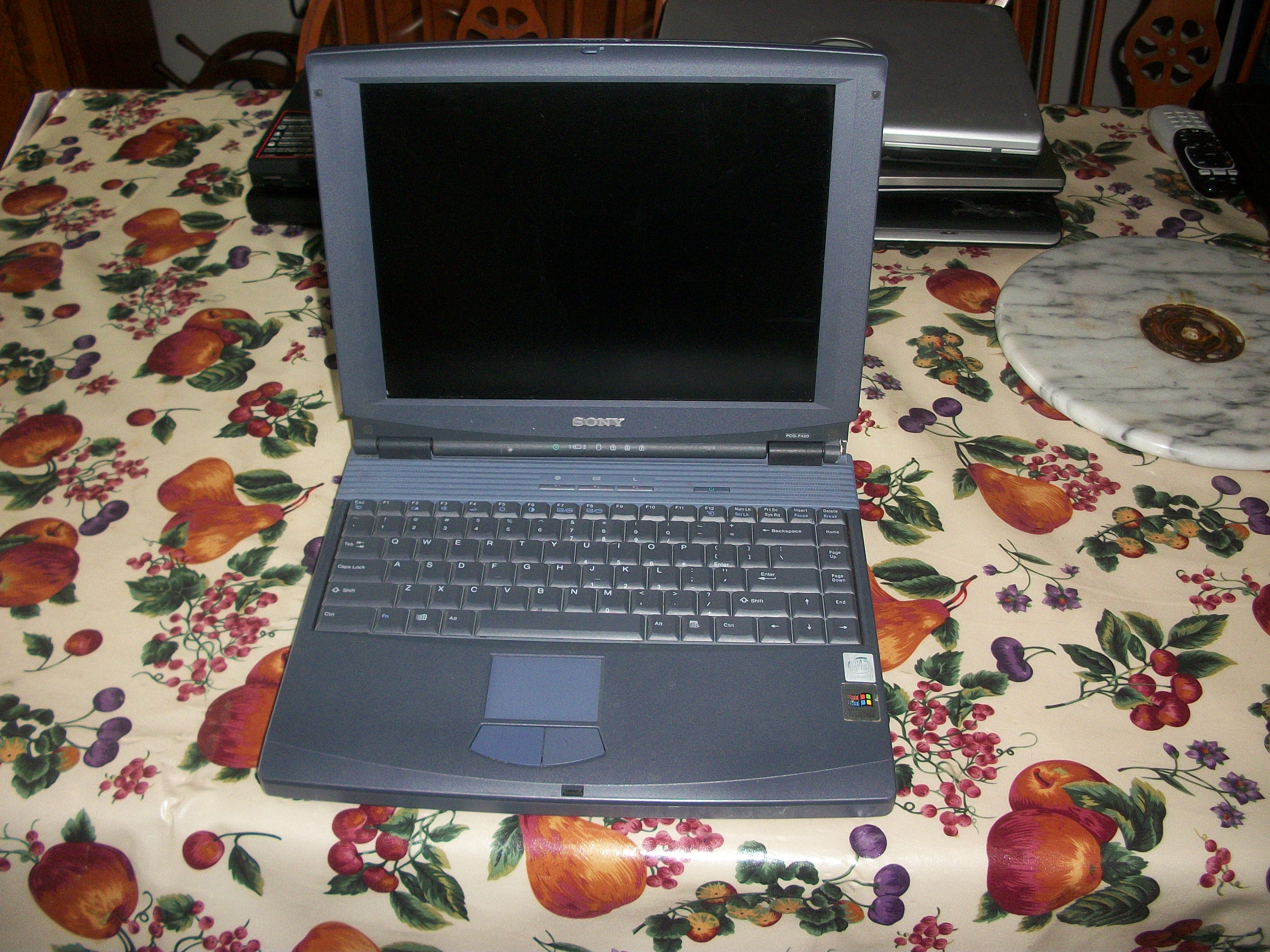
Sony Vaio PCG-F420 notebook from ~1999-2000

The original F series was launched with four models: the F160, F180 and F190 featured an active matrix 14.1" 1024 x 768 screen, while the base F150 model offered only a passive-matrix 13.0" 1024 x 768 screen. All four featured Pentium II processors from 300 MHz to 366 MHz, between 32 MB and 64 MB of RAM, a 4.3 or 6.4 GB hard drive, 56k built-in modem, a CD-ROM or DVD-ROM drive, and optional second battery/removable floppy disk drive.

The weight of F1- 14.1" models with floppy drive removed was 3.1 kg.

The successor models, launched mid-1999 were the F250, F270 and F290, each with 1024 x 768 resolution, and 13.0", 14.1" or 15.0" screens respectively, plus improved hardware specifications.

F3xx, F4xx, F5xx and finally F6xx (the last in October 2000) models were also released. The final spec of the F690 was a 15.0" 1400 x 1050 screen, Pentium 3 850 CPU, 30 GB hard drive, DVD drive and 128 MB RAM, weighing 3.1 kg.

Models with a "K" suffix shipped with Windows 2000.
