= Sony Vaio E series =

The Sony Vaio E series is a range of consumer-grade laptops manufactured by Sony since 2010. The 14 and 15" laptops are configurable in a choice of bright colors: Passion Purple, Iridescent Blue, Caribbean Green, Coconut White, Hibiscus Pink, Lava Black and Gunmetal Black, while the 17" laptops offer only black or white. There is also an 11.6" version available. Each laptop each features 4GB & 8GB DDR3 RAM, optical drive (DVD burner/Blu-ray player/or Blu-ray burner), Bluetooth functionality, 802.11b/g/n wireless and gigabit ethernet,HDMI,mic & headphone jack.

== Intel laptops ==
Each laptop features a dual-core Intel Arrandale Pentium, Core i3, Core i5 or Core i7 CPU (35W TDP chips).

=== EB Series ===
The EB series was launched in February 2010, and features a 15.5" 1366x768 or 1920x1080 LED-backlit screen, up to 640GB hard drive, Intel GMA, ATI Mobility Radeon 5470 or 5650 GPU. The laptop weighs 5.95 lbs and has 2.5 hours battery life.

=== EC series ===
The EC series was launched in June 2010, and features a 17.3" 1600x900 or 1920x1080 LED-backlit screen, 320-500GB hard drive, or 2x320GB or 2x500GB drives, ATI Mobility Radeon 5470 or 5650 GPU. The laptop weighs 7.3 lbs, and has 4 hours battery life.

== AMD laptops ==
=== EE Series ===
The EE series is the AMD equivalent to the EB series. It features ATI Mobility Radeon graphics, AMD Champlain Phenom II-based dual core (Athlon II) and triple core (Phenom II) chips (25W TDP).

=== EF Series ===
The EF series is the AMD equivalent to the EC series. It features ATI Mobility Radeon graphics, AMD Champlain Phenom II-based dual core (Athlon II) and triple core (Phenom II) chips (25W TDP).
