= Sony Vaio M series =

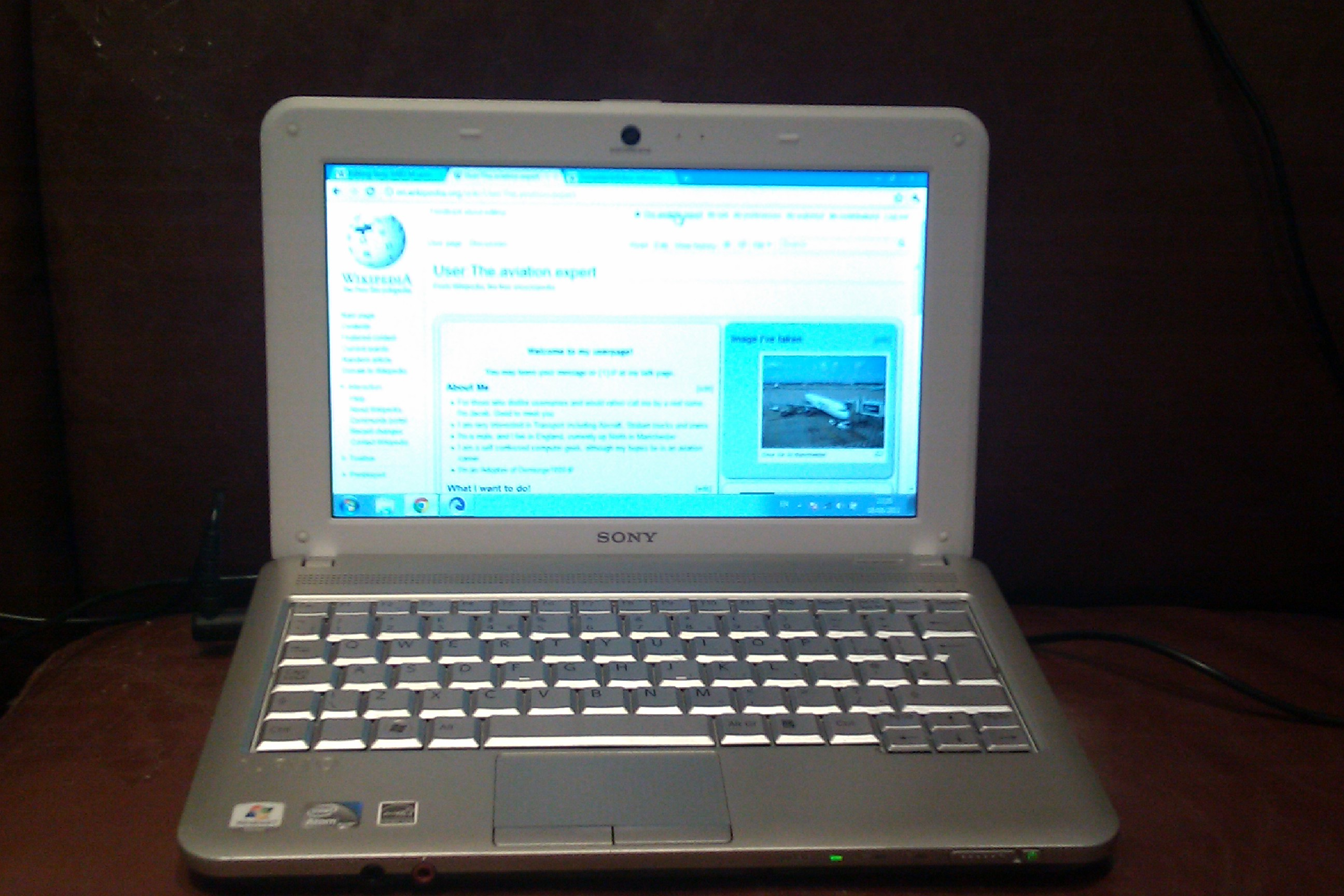
- Manufacturer: Sony
- Type: Netbook
- Released: April 21, 2008; 18 years ago
- Introductory price: £329
- Operating system: Windows XP Pro with SP3
- CPU: Intel Atom
- Memory: 1GB
- Storage: 250 or 320GB
- Display: 10.1 inch Glossy LCD
- Graphics: Intel(R) Graphics Media Accelerator 3150
- Sound: Stereo
- Input: Microphone
- Camera: Motion Eye 0.3MP
- Touchpad: Yes
- Connectivity: WiFi, Ethernet
- Power: 40 W
- Weight: 1.4 kg

The Sony Vaio M Series was a range of multimedia-oriented Vaio desktop PCs sold by Sony in Japan from 1998 to 1999.

The name was then relaunched as a series of netbooks in April 2008. It is a cheaper alternative to the Sony Vaio W series netbooks, having only a 10.1" 1024x600 screen.

It features a 1.83 GHz Intel Atom N470 CPU, 1GB of DDR2 memory, 250GB or 320GB hard drive, 802.11b/g/n wireless, Ethernet, 0.3MP webcam, and Windows 7 Starter. It weighs 1.4 kg.
