= Kids Station =

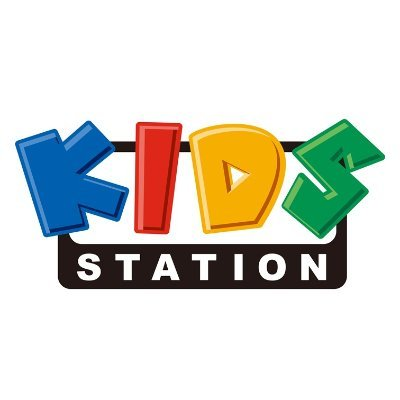
- Logo used since 2004
- Country: Japan
- Broadcast area: Nationwide
- Headquarters: Ebisu, Shibuya, Tokyo

Programming
- Languages: Japanese; English (via Second Audio Program)
- Picture format: 1080i HDTV

Ownership
- Owner: Animax Broadcast Japan (AK Entertainment)

History
- Launched: April 1, 1991; 35 years ago
- Former names: Lemon Channel (1991–1993)

Kids Station (キッズステーション, Kizzu Sutēshon) is a Japanese cable and satellite television channel that launched on April 12, 1993. It primarily airs anime and other animation-related content aimed at children during the day, and teens and adults at night.

An HD feed of the channel (Kids Station HD (Japanese: キッズステーションHD, Kizzu Sutēshon HD) was first established on October 1, 2009.

In 2017, Sony Pictures Entertainment Japan announced a joint venture with Mitsui & Co. known as "AK Holdings", which would acquire their respective stakes in Animax and Kids Station, with Sony as the majority owner of the company.

On December 18, 2023, Sony Pictures Entertainment Japan announced they would sell their stakes in both Animax and Kids Station to electronic store chain Nojima. The deal was finalized on April 1, 2024.

== See also ==
- Nickelodeon
- Cartoon Network
- Disney Channel
- AT-X
- TV Tokyo

== Ownership ==
- AK Entertainment (Nojima)
- Tokyo Broadcasting System
- JCOM
- Horipro
