= Sony Vaio FJ =

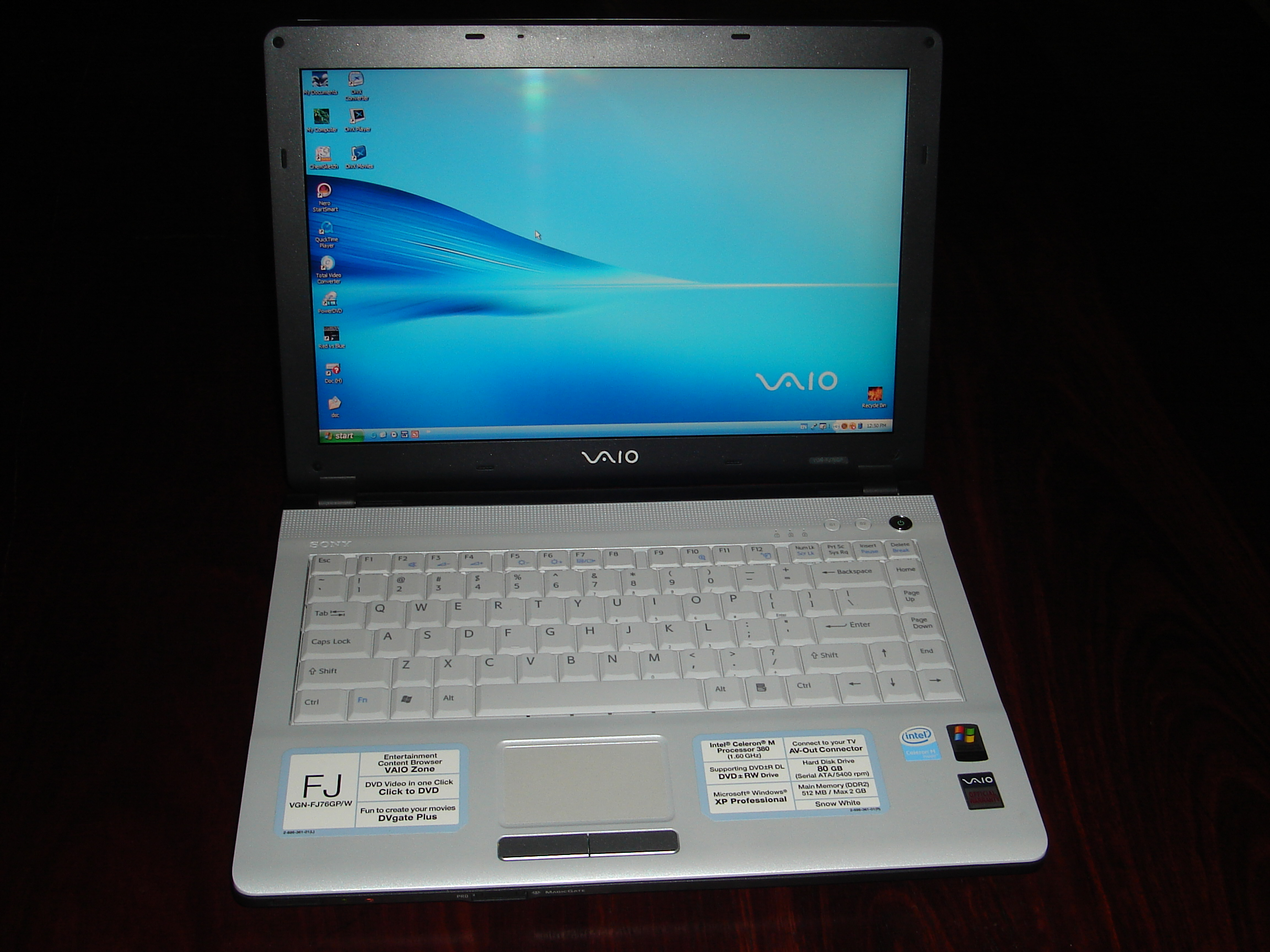
A Sony VAIO FJ76 Notebook

The Sony Vaio FJ series is a 14.1-inch notebook designed for Windows XP and the FJ270, FJ290, FJ330,FJ370 models in particular, are designed for Windows Vista. The FJ Series uses only the Pentium M processors using the Sonoma platform of Intel Centrino.

The VAIO FJ has a thin, 14.1" wide screen display with Sony's original XBRITE-ECO LCD technology and it has a built-in Motion Eye web camera above the screen in the bezel.

== Low end FJ ==
Sony released a low end edition of FJ series. This was much cheaper and available from US$800, but it didn't include a built in camera, and used Intel Celeron (1.60 GHz) processor instead of the more powerful Centrino CPU (1.90 or 2.33 GHz). It also included a 60GB hard drive instead of the usual 100GB. This model sold well in the Asian market.

== FJ Market ==
The FJ series was first targeted as a home/work computer as the FJ190 but the FJ270/370 which was the most powerful edition was for home/work/student computer the FJ290 which had inferior specifications was the "colors" computer because it was available in five color which were later expanded to 9 colors when VAIO 10th anniversary special edition appeared in Japan the FJ series called F light is available in different colors than in America and was TV capable using Windows Media Center. F light series are starting to be replaced by the C series like in America.

== Specifications ==
- Intel Centrino Processor 750 or Centrino Napa (Intel Core Solo)(newer models such as FJ270 or FJ370)
- 1.86 GHz SPEED
- 1GB (PC2-4200 512MB x 2) RAM MEMORY
- 100GB SATA HARD DRIVE
- WXGA Screen with 14.1” XBRITE - Res: 1280×800
- MULTIMEDIA CARD READER (Memory Stick (with MagicGate functionality)
  - Memory Stick PRO (with MagicGate functionality)
  - Memory Stick Duo (with MagicGate functionality)
  - PCMCIA (Type I and Type II card slot with CardBus support)
- Intel Graphics Media Accelerator 915 or 950 with 128MB (dynamically allocated shared RAM/video memory)
- 1 MP built in webcam
- Wifi 802.11b/n
- BATTERY LIFE:
  - Windows XP: 1.5 to 3.5hr
  - Windows Vista: 1.2 to 2.5hr

== See also ==
- VAIO
