= Sony Vaio W series =

Netbook computers

The Sony Vaio W series is a series of netbooks, and formerly a series of desktop PCs.

== All-in-one desktops (2002) ==
The Sony Vaio W series is a line of all-in-one PCs. It was first launched in Japan, and introduced in the U.S. market in October 2002, with the first model being PCV-W10. Combining features such as large multimedia speakers, foldable keyboards, a large 15.3-inch display, i.LINK, 1.6 GHz Pentium 4 CPUs with 512 MB RAM, and in some later models TV features, the W series was seen as a high-end multimedia series with great specs for its time. It was replaced by the Vaio L series in 2006.

== Netbooks (2009) ==
Sony Vaio W series
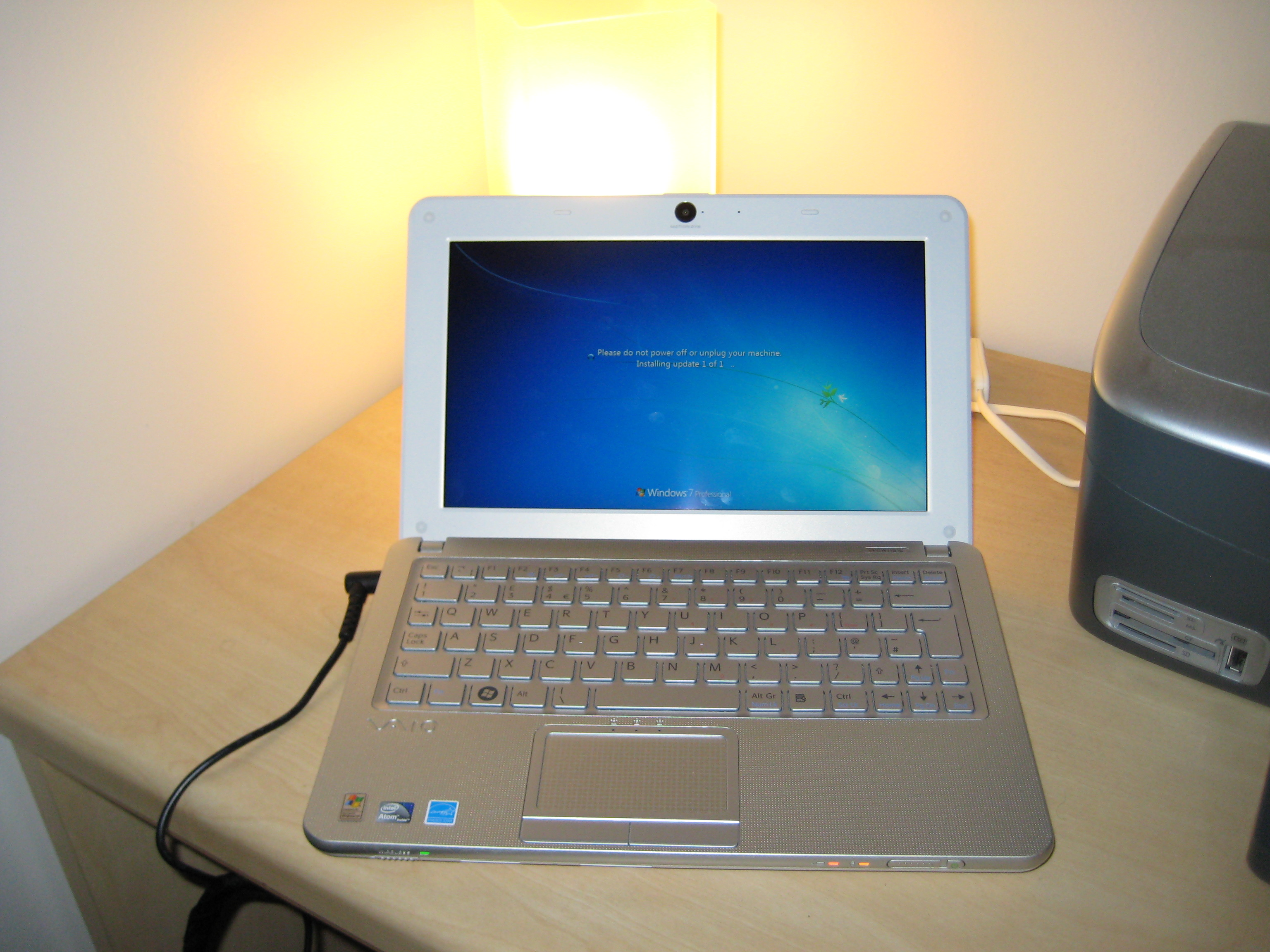
- Developer: Sony
- Type: Netbook
- Released: July 7, 2009; 17 years ago
- Introductory price: US$499 (equivalent to $748.85 in 2025)
- Operating system: Windows XP Media Center
- CPU: Intel Atom

The Sony Vaio W series name was relaunched in 2009 as a series of notebook computers. It is aimed primarily towards the youth market, creating a new market audience for Vaio. The product is intended to be mainly used for at home for browsing, sharing photos online, downloading music and online networking. It clearly differentiates itself from the existing notebook line-up and is not presented as a full PC.

=== Features ===
- 10.1” 16:9 WXGA 1366×768 X-black LCD screen with LED backlights
- 2.6 lb.
- Full pitch isolation keyboard
- Intel Atom N280 processor at 1.66 GHz
- Built in webcam and microphone
- 3-hour battery
- Wireless b/g/n networking
- Matching accessories (carry pouch and mouse accessory kit)

=== Models ===
The models are made in three colors: pink, white, and brown. Their base price is (USD) $499.

Model	Color	Screen	Processor	Memory	Storage Drive	Audio	Operating System
VPCW11S1E/W	White	10.1” 16:9 WXGA 1366×768 X-black LCD screen with LED backlights	Intel Atom N280	1 GB DDR2	160 GB HDD		Windows XP Home
VPCW11S1E/T	Brown	10.1” 16:9 WXGA 1366×768 X-black LCD screen with LED backlights	Intel Atom N280	1 GB DDR2	160 GB HDD		Windows XP Home
VPCW11S1E/P	Pink	10.1” 16:9 WXGA 1366×768 X-black LCD screen with LED backlights	Intel Atom N280	1 GB DDR2	160 GB HDD		Windows XP Home
VPCW12S1E/W	White	10.1” 16:9 WXGA 1366×768 X-black LCD screen with LED backlights	Intel Atom N280	1 GB DDR2	250 GB HDD		Windows 7 Starter
VPCW12S1E/T	Tan	10.1” 16:9 WXGA 1366×768 X-black LCD screen with LED backlights	Intel Atom N280	1 GB DDR2	250 GB HDD		Windows 7 Starter
VPCW12S1E/P	Pink	10.1” 16:9 WXGA 1366×768 X-black LCD screen with LED backlights	Intel Atom N280	1 GB DDR2	250 GB HDD		Windows 7 Starter
