= Nojima Corporation =

Japanese consumer electronics company

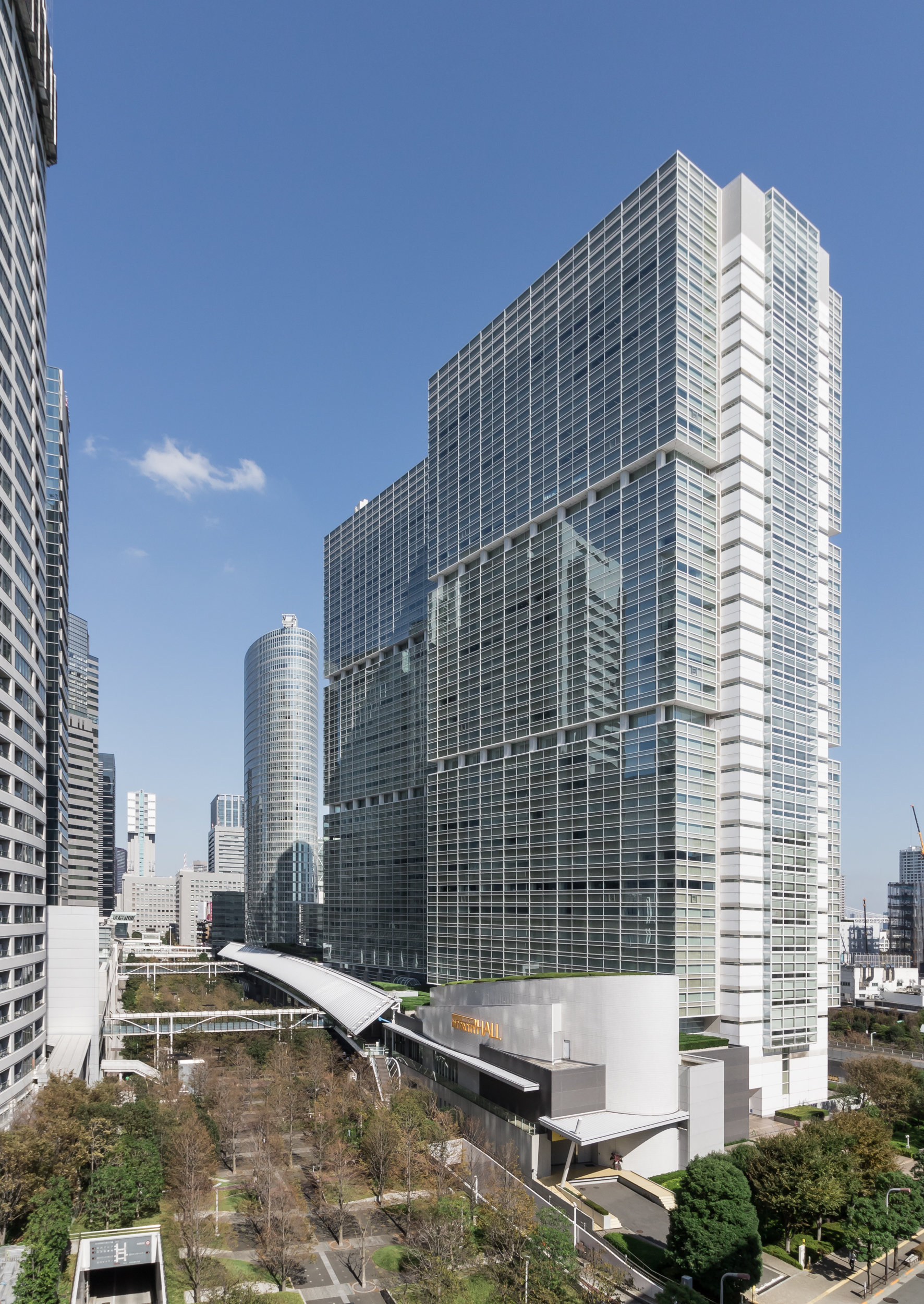
- Headquarters in Minato, Tokyo
- Native name: 株式会社ノジマ
- Romanized name: Kabushiki-gaisha Nojima
- Formerly: Nojima Electric Company, Limited (1962-1982)
- Traded as: TYO: 7419
- Industry: Retail
- Founded: April 1962; 64 years ago (as Nojima Electric); June 23, 1982; 44 years ago (current incarnation)
- Headquarters: Konan, Minato, Tokyo, Japan
- Area served: Japan; Cambodia; Malaysia; Vietnam
- Key people: Hiroshi Nojima (president and CEO)
- Products: Consumer electronics
- Website: nojima.co.jp

Nojima Corporation (株式会社ノジマ, Kabushiki-gaisha Nojima) is a Japanese consumer electronics conglomerate headquartered in Minato, Tokyo. The company operates the Nojima retail chain, which is mostly found in the Kantō area and also operates in Cambodia.

== History ==
The company was established in 1959 as Nojima Electric Industry Co., Ltd. (野島電気工業社) in Sagamihara, Kanagawa, as a company selling electrical products. Nojima Electric was set up in 1962 and the company was reorganized in 1982, changing its name to Nojima Corporation in 1991.

In 2007, Nojima and Shinden merged; Laox, which up until then was Shinden's largest shareholder, continued to hold shares for Nojima. In 2009, 200 Laox employees were hired by Nojima after an acquisition failed. In 2013, the company set up a subsidiary in Phnom Penh, Nojima (Cambodia) Co. Ltd., with capital of 250 million yen.

On May 7, 2015, Nojima announced the merger of its ITN and ITX subsidiaries. ITN was created by Nojima to acquire shares. In 2019, it acquired Courts' Asian operations.

Nojima entered the pay television business on October 1, 2021, with the acquisition of three channels from Sony Pictures Entertainment and J:COM: AXN Entertainment, AXN Japan and Mystery Channel. The AXN subsidiary acquired Animax and Kids Station from Sony Pictures Entertainment in late 2023; the sale closed on April 1, 2024; at the end of 2024, it acquired Vaio.

In September 2026, Nojima completed the acquisition of a 70% stake in Yamato Credit Finance from Yamato Holdings through a special-purpose subsidiary, making the credit-finance company a consolidated subsidiary. The acquired company was renamed N Credit Finance on the same day. The transaction followed a May 2026 agreement under which Nojima agreed to acquire Yamato Holdings' 70% holding for approximately ¥3.5 billion.
