= VisualFlow =

Computer application

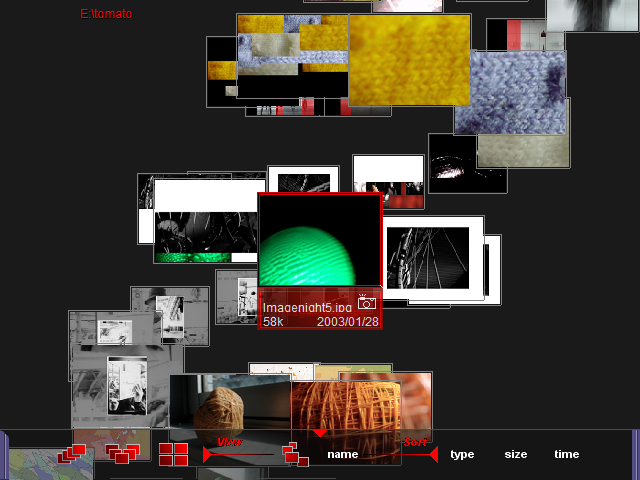
Screenshot of Visualflow - 3D visual file browser for the VAIO computers - spiral view of image thumbnails

VisualFlow was a Sony program distributed in the late 1990s and early 2000s with Sony VAIO computers. It offered an alternative GUI, designed to permit "easy viewing of stored image data".

As the user selected large icons representing folders and files within VisualFlow, the program would depict them with user-selectable animations. These included left and right movements and spiraling movements, similar to the helical structures of DNA. The main Visual Flow interface consisted of red icons on a black background, and resembled Vector graphics, although VisualFlow was capable of displaying certain image files within the program environment. VisualFlow could run in a full-screen or windowed mode.

VisualFlow was built to only run on Sony VAIO products. This was typically enforced by vendor ID checking.

VisualFlow was notable for being a rare effort at GUI innovation on the part of the PC manufacturer. VisualFlow is showcased on the Sony Design website for being an exceptional attempt at interface design in the 1990s.
