= Sony Vaio TT series =

The Sony Vaio TT series was a line of high-end ultraportable notebook computers from Sony introduced in September 2008, with high-end features including an ultra-low voltage Core 2 Duo processor with DDR3 SDRAM; an 11.1", 16:9, 1366x768 LED-backlit LCD screen with built-in 0.3 megapixel webcam; choice of 1.8" hard drive or SSD (optionally with RAID); and optional Blu-ray drive. The weight of the laptop is 1.3 kg.

The laptop's base price was $2000, and a configuration with a 1.4 GHz Core 2 Duo U9400 CPU, 4 GB of RAM, two 128 GB SSDs in RAID and Blu-ray writer cost $4,450.

The system sold very poorly in the United States and Europe, due to competition from netbooks costing as little as 10% of the TT's price, and was discontinued less than a year after its introduction. It was replaced in the lineup by the X series, also an 11.1" laptop, but reduced in weight, price and performance, due to the use of the Intel Atom processor and the omission of the optical drive.

It continued to be sold in the Asia Pacific region, where an updated model featuring a U9600 (1.6 GHz) CPU and Windows 7 was released. It was discontinued in early 2010.

The 11-inch MacBook Air, released in October 2010, had similar specifications to the Vaio TT series.
