= Sony Vaio MX series =

The Sony Vaio MX series was a series of multimedia-rich desktop PCs part of Sony's Vaio line, first launched in 2000. Sony combined a desktop PC with high-end Hi-Fi features for an entertainment system. The MX series PCs had a built-in FM radio, MiniDisc player, and an LCD. It also came with a strong bass amplifier speakers and a remote control.
