= Courts (Asian retailer) =

Singapore-based retailer

PT Courts Retail Indonesia Courts (Malaysia) Sdn. Bhd. Courts (Singapore) Pte Ltd.
- Logo used since 2003
- Industry: Consumer electronics and furniture retailer
- Founded: 1974; 52 years ago
- Founder: Albert Court
- Area served: Indonesia; Malaysia; Singapore; Thailand (formerly)
- Owner: Nojima Corporation
- Website: courts.hemat.id courts.com.my courts.com.sg

Courts is a consumer electronics and furniture retailer, operating across Southeast Asia. The company runs a network of retail stores, as well as an e-commerce platform.

== History ==
Courts was founded in 1850 by Albert Court in Canterbury, England. The company was later acquired by the Cohen family, who expanded its international presence. It subsequently became a public company under the name Courts plc.

In Malaysia, the company was incorporated on 23 July 1986 as Courts Furnishers (Malaysia) Sdn. Bhd. It was renamed Courts Sdn Bhd on 30 June 1997, and converted into a public company on 1 July 1997. Courts was listed on the Main Board of the Kuala Lumpur Stock Exchange (now Bursa Malaysia Securities Berhad) on 11 October 2000.

In 2004, the UK-based parent company, Courts plc, entered administration. Its operations in Singapore and Malaysia were subsequently acquired by Asia Retail Group, a consortium comprising Baring Private Equity Asia and Topaz Investment. Following the change in ownership, Courts was delisted from Bursa Malaysia on 3 September 2007.

Courts later expanded its presence in Southeast Asia, operating in Singapore, Malaysia, and Indonesia. On 16 December 2006, the company launched its first “Megastore” in Tampines, Singapore. Located at 50 Tampines North Drive 2, the store introduced a large-format, warehouse-style retail concept. Additional Megastores were later opened in Sri Damansara, Malaysia (2013), and Kota Harapan Indah, Indonesia (2014).

In 2019, Courts Asia was acquired by the Japanese electronics retailer Nojima Corporation.
