= Sony Vaio FZ series =

The Sony Vaio FZ series is a discontinued model of laptop sold by Sony in 2007. It replaced the Sony Vaio FE series, featuring Intel Core 2 Duo rather than Core Duo CPU, magnesium-alloy chassis and other improvements. It was criticised for the low-resolution (1280x800) of its 15.4-inch screen, poor battery life and its 2.7 kg weight. It was, however, praised for its build quality, display quality (with 98% SRGB & 92% Adobe RGB coverage), keyboard and the inclusion of Blu-ray drives on more expensive models.

Specifications: 15.4-inch 1280×800 screen, Intel Core 2 Duo T7100, T7250, T7300, T7500, T7700, T8100, T8300, T9300 or T9500 CPU, 2 or 4 GB RAM, NVIDIA GeForce 8400M or 8600M GS or GT graphics, 120-300 GB hard drive, optional Blu-ray, HDMI, bluetooth, wireless 802.11 b/g/n. Designed for Windows Vista.

The series features the Nvidia 8000 Series GPU, which suffered from failures. Aware of this fault, Sony extended the warranty of affected notebooks to 4 years, covering the replacement of faulty GPUs.

It was replaced by the Sony Vaio FW series, which featured a larger, 16.4-inch screen.
