= Sony Vaio FS series =

The Sony Vaio FS series is a discontinued range of laptops sold by Sony. It was launched in January 2005 and featured an Intel Pentium M at 1.6 or 1.73 GHz with 512 MB of RAM and Intel GMA 900 or nVidia Geforce 6200 graphics. The screen was a 15.4" 1280x800 display with an 80 GB or 100 GB 4200 rpm hard drive, DVD playback and CD burner and 802.11b/g wi-fi. It weighed 2.9 kg.

It was replaced in 2006 by the Sony Vaio FE series introducing the Intel Core Duo.
