= Sony Vaio VGX series =

The Sony Vaio VGX series was a series of living room PCs created for Sony's Vaio line that were released from 2005 until 2008. The VGX series was aimed at consumers who wanted the flexibility of able to watch TV and have the functionality of a computer at the comfort of their living room. All models came built-in with an HDMI port, VHF/UHF output, S-Video, Optical Audio port, and a variation of Microsoft Windows with Media Center installed.

== VGX-XL Series ==
=== Models ===
Model	Color	Processor (CPU)	Graphics (GPU)	Memory	Storage Drive	Optical Drive	2nd Optical Drive	Disc Changer	Audio	Operating System
VGX-XL1	Black/Silver	Intel Pentium D 820 @ 2.8 GHz Dual Core	NVIDIA GeForce 6200 with 64 MB	512 MB DDR2 SDRAM	200 GB Hard Drive	DVD±RW (+R DL)	CD-RW / DVD	200-Disc DVD Changer		Microsoft Windows XP Media Center Edition 2005
VGX-XL2	Black/Silver	Intel Pentium D 920		1 GB DDR2 SDRAM	160 GB Hard Drive	DVD±RW (+R DL)	N/A	200-Disc DVD Changer	Sony Sound Reality technology with DSD support	Microsoft Windows XP Media Center Edition 2005
VGX-XL3	Black/Silver	Intel Core 2 Duo E6400		2 GB DDR2 SDRAM	2x250 GB Hard Drives	BD-RE	N/A	N/A		Microsoft Windows Vista Home Premium

== VGX-TP Series ==
=== Models ===
Model	Color	Processor (CPU)	Graphics (GPU)	Memory	Storage Drive	Optical Drive	Audio	Operating System
VGX-TP1	White	Intel Core 2 Duo T5600		2 GB DDR2 SDRAM	300 GB Hard Drive	DVD±RW (±R DL) / DVD-RAM		Windows Vista Home Premium
VGX-TP20EB	Black	Intel Core 2 Duo T8100		2 GB DDR2 SDRAM	500 GB Hard Drive	DVD±RW (±R DL) / DVD-RAM / BD-ROM		Windows Vista Home Premium
VGX-TP20EW	White	Intel Core 2 Duo T8100		2 GB DDR2 SDRAM	500 GB Hard Drive	DVD±RW (±R DL) / DVD-RAM / BD-ROM		Windows Vista Home Premium
VGX-TP25E	Black	Intel Core 2 Duo T8100		4 GB DDR2 SDRAM	500 GB Hard Drive	DVD±RW (±R DL) / DVD-RAM / BD-ROM		Windows Vista Home Premium
