= Sony Vaio L series =

The Sony Vaio L series is a range of Vaio all-in-one desktop computers sold by Sony since 2006.

== Windows 7 models ==
Since the launch of Windows 7, the L series has been a touchscreen PC, featuring a 24" 1920×1080 LCD touchscreen. As of 2013, the L series used the Windows 8 operating system.

The Sony Vaio J series is similar to the L series, except that it features a 21.5" 1920×1080 LCD touchscreen.

=== Specifications ===
Processor (CPU)	Graphics	Memory(RAM)	Storage (Hard Drive)	Weight	Screen Size	Screen Resolution	HD Webcam	Touchscreen	Operating system
3rd generation Intel Core i7		8 GB	1 TB to 2 TB	25.35 pounds (11.50 kg)	24"	1920×1080	Yes	Yes	Windows 8 64-bit
