= Sony Vaio VGN-TX2 =

Subnotebook computer made by Sony

The Vaio VGN-TX2 was a subnotebook, or ultraportable, computer made by Sony.

== Overview ==
The Vaio VGN-TX2 stands out by its quiet operation, long battery life and low weight compared to similar models from other manufacturers. This required a low-power processor to be chosen, and as a result, the clock speed remained at 1.1 GHz for the "HP" and 1.2 GHz for the more expensive "XP" model. The other difference between the two models is that the HP has 512 MiB of RAM and the XP 1 GiB. To achieve the low weight, Sony chose a carbon-fibre case. It was released in September 2005.

== Versions ==
The TX had been released into four types in North America, with the 600, 700, 800 and TXN series. The 600 series came with a 1.2 GHz Pentium M processor and 60 gigabyte hard drive. The 700 series is similar, except it had a 1.3 GHz Pentium M processor and 80 gigabyte hard drive. The 800 series had the same hard drive as the 700 series but instead had a 1.2 GHz Core Solo processor, giving it even longer battery life than its predecessors. This iteration of the TX line also had a built-in fingerprint reader. The TXN model was only available in North America and is similar to the TX800, except it had a built in Sprint EVDO modem and antenna whereas the TX800 series lacked either. The previous TX600s and TX700s had built-in Cingular EDGE modems and antennas. The TXN models were also slightly heavier and thicker than all other TX models to accommodate the built-in Sprint EVDO WWAN modem.

== Features ==
The TX series used 1.8-inch hard drives with most units having 512 MB of ram built into the motherboard and one RAM slot free to be upgraded to 1.5 GB of RAM max, whereas some higher-end models have 1 GB of RAM built in and so were able to be upgraded to 2 GB of RAM max.

They also had an instant-on feature, which has become a common feature in notebooks since HP introduced it in their notebooks in late 2004 which lets one play DVD movies, view photos from a memory stick or SD card or play music CDs without booting up to Windows.

It has different model names outside North America. The VGN-TX2 is the European–Japanese equivalent of the VGN-TX7XXP for instance and the VGN-TX3 is identical to the VGN-TX8XXP.

All models used the older PCMCIA card standard whereas some of its competitors at the time opted to use the newer Expresscard format.

Like most Vaio notebooks, this model had a widescreen display, in this case with a resolution of 1366×768 pixels and 11.1 inches diagonally which gives it a 16:9 aspect ratio vs 16:10 for most other widescreen notebooks. It weighs 1.25 kg. Within the Vaio range, its weight is undercut by the Vaio PCG-X505, which weighs only 780 g and the recently released Vaio G series. However, these latter models do not have a built-in optical drive.

The TX also can be fitted with an extended battery which has roughly twice the capacity as its standard battery. The standard battery has roughly 7800 mAh capacity.

The final release of the TX such as the VGN-TXN2x series known in North America and VGN-TX5 in Europe were preloaded with Windows Vista Business edition instead of Windows XP Professional.

== Now superseded ==
The TX series was superseded by the Sony Vaio TZ series in April 2007 which featured ULV Core 2 Duo processors, an Expresscard slot, and other updates. It retained the same size 11.1" LED backlit LCD and AV Mode/buttons.
