= Sony Vaio 700 series =

The Sony Vaio 700 series were Sony's first Vaio branded laptops, starting with the 705 and 707 models, launched in Japan on July 1, 1997, and subsequently in the United States.

The 700 series featured removable 3.5" floppy disk drive, removable 14x CD-ROM, 33.6 kbit/s integrated modem, 12.1" screen, 2.1 GB hard disk drive, 2 MB VRAM, 128 MB maximum RAM, IrDA port, lithium-ion battery, with optional second battery and an optional docking station with Firewire, USB, mouse, keyboard, Ethernet and SCSI.

The launch models offered an 800x600 screen (705) or 1024x768 screen (707), 256 KB cache, 16 MB (705) or 32 MB (707) RAM a Pentium MMX 150 or 166 MHz CPU, and Windows 95 pre-installed.

The weight with single battery, and CD and floppy disk drive removed was 2.4 kg (5.3 lb).

The 700 series was produced only in 1997 and 1998, later replaced by lighter models.

== Models ==
- PCG-705 - see above
- PCG-707 - see above
- PCG-717 - 705 upgraded with 200 MHz CPU
- PCG-719 - 707 upgraded with 512 KB cache, 233 MHz CPU
- PCG-729 - 266 MHz Pentium MMX, 64 MB RAM
- PCG-731 - 200 MHz Pentium MMX, 32 MB RAM
- PCG-735 - 233 MHz Pentium MMX, 64 MB RAM
- PCG-748 - 266 MHz Pentium MMX
