= NeoMagic =

Fabless semiconductor company

NeoMagic Corporation
- Company type: Manufacturing, e-Commerce
- Traded as: OTC Pink: NMGC
- Founded: 1993
- Headquarters: San Jose, California
- Products: SOCs
- Website: www.neomagic.com

NeoMagic Corporation is a fabless semiconductor company and supplier of low-power audio and video integrated circuits for mobile use (MagicMedia).

In October 2012, NeoMagic entered into the e-commerce arena with the acquisition of its MercadoMagico.com division. MercadoMagico.com provides a multivendor platform where users buy and sell products from one another or buy electronic products directly.

== History ==
NeoMagic Corporation was founded in 1993 in California. Working with semiconductor vendor Mitsubishi Electric as a key foundry supplier, NeoMagic introduced its first graphics processors in 1995; these were notable for being the first chips to combine a graphics logic and DRAM video memory into one chip. As this was a more power-efficient method than ones previously used by graphics processors, most of the major laptop manufacturers of the time began to use NeoMagic graphics chips in their systems. In 2000, NeoMagic left the laptop market completely, and switched its focus to producing systems on a chip, or SOCs, for mobile phones and other handheld devices, like PDAs. The firm's first handheld chips were unveiled in 2001, when NeoMagic introduced the MiMagic line. The initial MiMagic chips were based on a 32-bit MIPS Technologies RISC processor core, and featured 4MB of embedded DRAM, as well as a 1024x768-capable graphics chip, and an AC'97-compatible sound processor. Subsequent versions of the MiMagic chip family starting from the MiMagic 3 in 2002, were based on 32-bit ARM RISC processor cores. In October 2012, NeoMagic acquired MercadoMagico.com. In November 2023, NeoMagic acquired Advanced Microwave Incorporated.

== MagicGraph ==
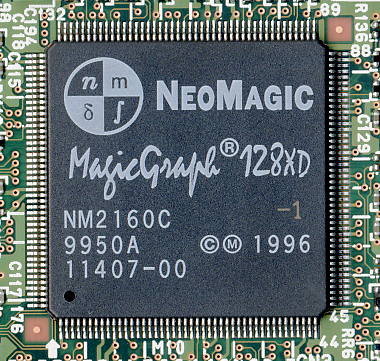
MagicGraph128XD NM2160C

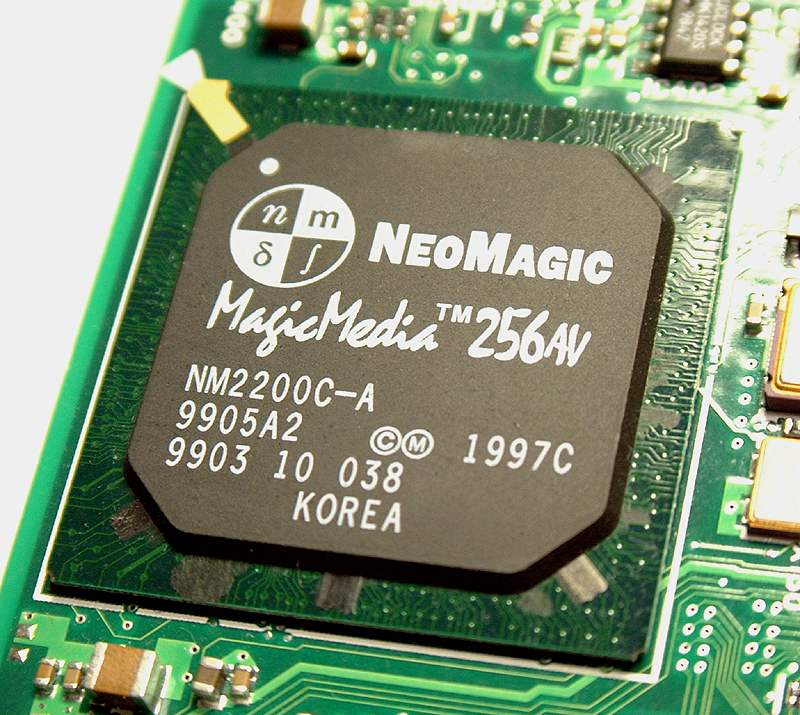
MagicMedia256AV NM2200C-A

Model	Chipset
MagicGraph 128	NM2070
MagicGraph 128V	NM2090
MagicGraph 128ZV	NM2093
MagicGraph 128ZV+	NM2097
MagicGraph 128XD	NM2160
MagicMedia 256AV	NM2200
MagicMedia 256AV+	NM2230
MagicMedia 256ZX	NM2360
MagicMedia 256XL+	NM2380

=== Adoption ===
These chips were used in a number of different laptop computers. In 1998, Red Hat was able to release the source code of the XFree86 driver developed by Precision Insight Inc. which was previously distributed as proprietary software. The NeoMagic driver included in the Linux kernel is partly based on the XFree86 one.
