= Sony Vaio X series =

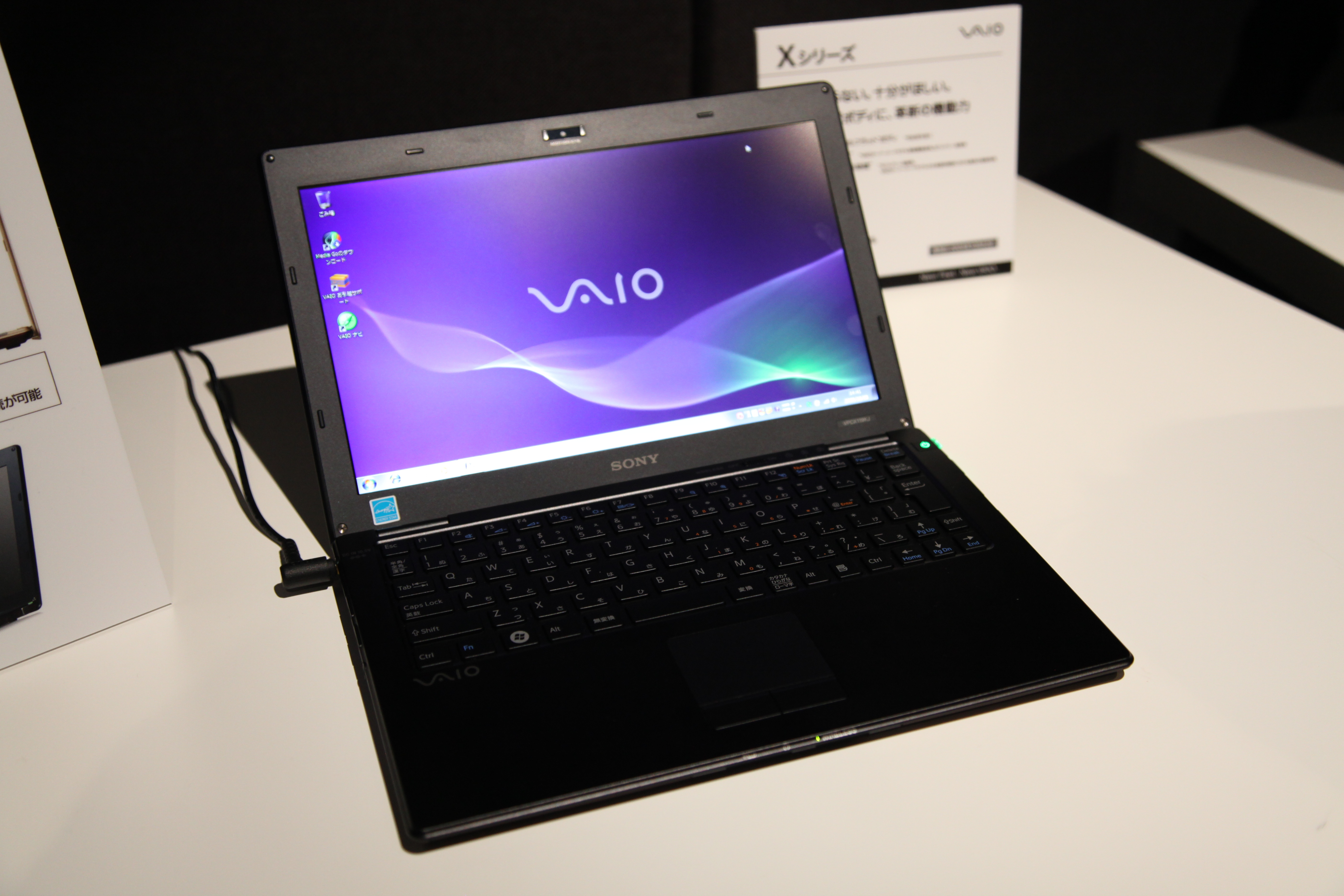
Vaio VPCX110KJ

The Vaio X series is a line of high-end ultraportable notebook computers from Sony introduced in September 2009, claiming to be the world's lightest notebook, at 655 grams (with special lighter battery; standard weight is 780 grams). It features an 11.1", 16:9, 1366x768 LED-lit LCD screen with built-in webcam, 2GB of DDR2 RAM, a choice of 64, 128 or 256 GB SSD (no hard drive option, SSD choice depends on territory), Intel Atom Z540 1.86 GHz or Z550 2.00 GHz (CPU choice varies by territory), WWAN (HSDPA, UMTS, EDGE and GPRS built-in).

The choice of the slower Intel Atom CPU, rather than a Core 2 chip, arguably places the device in the netbook class, however its pricing at over $1000, and other hardware aspects, such as the high resolution screen, Windows 7 on all models, and SSD usage suggest that it is a full notebook.

The device features an SD and Memory Stick reader, Bluetooth support, 2 USB ports, and a VGA port. Due to its thickness (thinner than a MacBook Air), the Ethernet port is angled, as a square-on port would be taller than the laptop.

Users wanting extended battery life can use the included extended battery, which is described as a battery-stand, tilting the laptop at an angle.
