= Sony Vaio FW series =

Laptop computer

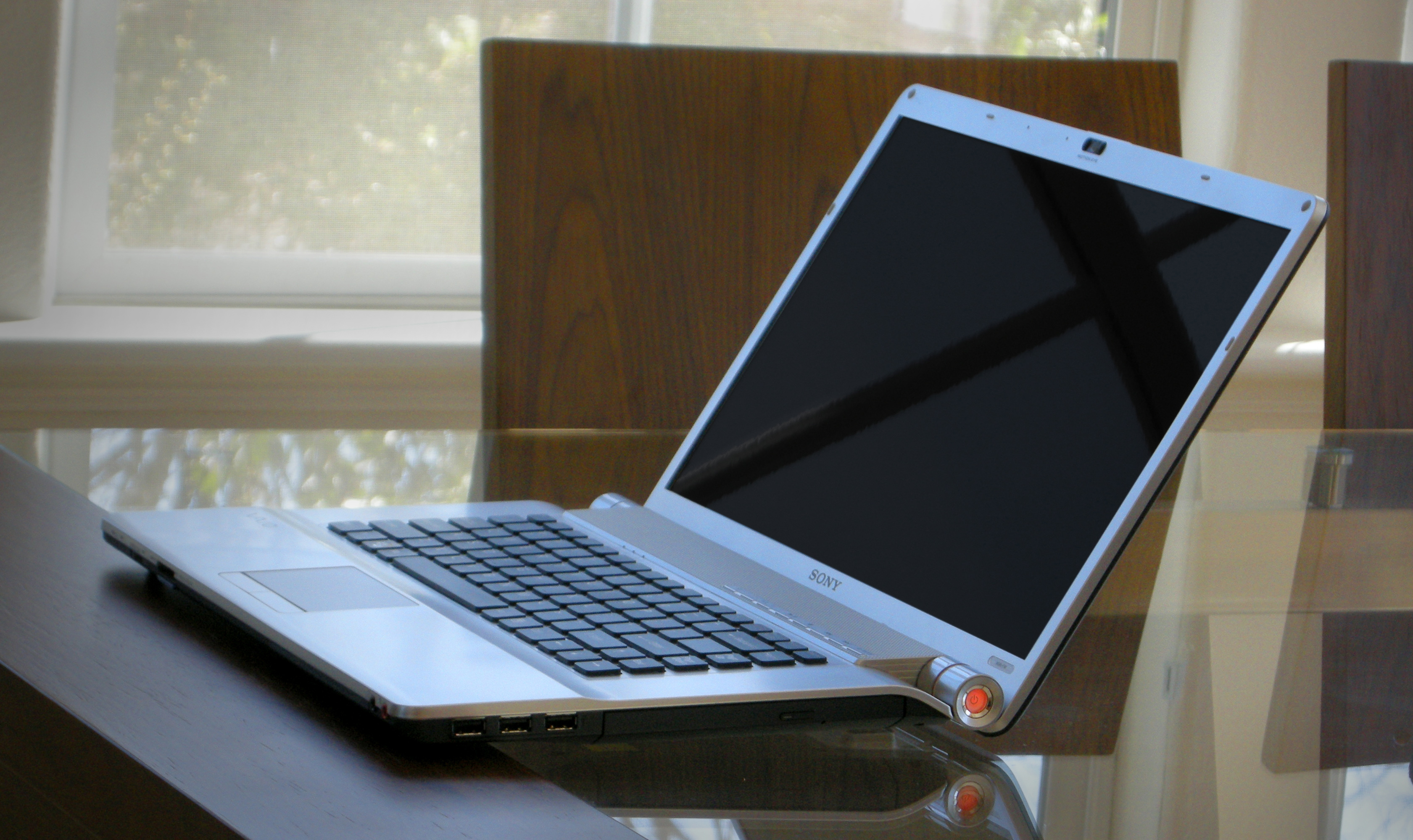
- Sony Vaio VGN-FW590
- Developer: Sony Corporation
- Type: Laptop
- Released: April 21, 2008
- Operating system: Windows Vista Home Premium SP1 Windows 7
- CPU: IntelIntel Core 2 Duo P7350, Intel Core 2 Duo P7450, Intel Core 2 Duo P8400, Intel Core 2 Duo P8700, Intel Core 2 Duo T5800, Intel Core 2 Duo T6400, Intel Core 2 Duo T9400, Intel Core 2 Duo T9550, Intel Core 2 Duo T9600
- Website: Sony Vaio — FW Series

Sony Vaio FW is a discontinued series of notebook computers which were the first laptops ever to have a 1080p 16.4" 16:9 widescreen LCD. Higher end models in the series can support an integral Blu-ray Disc reader or writer. The laptop weighed 3.1 kg. The battery lasts up to two hours. In June 2009, the ATI Mobility Radeon HD 3650 was replaced by the ATI Mobility Radeon HD 4650 with the release of the FW 4xx series. Additionally, Sony also released a special model of this series apart from the signature series models (Model:VGN-FW590FFD). This model had a futuristic themed cover and came equipped with moderately high-end specifications for $1069.99 U.S. dollars. The VGN-FW590FFD model was also only available for purchase through Sony Style's website.

- Processor: Intel Core 2 Duo
- Color: Black, Chocolate Brown, Nebula, Silver
- Memory: 2, 3, 4, 6, or 8 GB of DDR2 SDRAM @ 800 MHz
- Hard Drive: 160, 250, 320, 400, or 500 GB SATA Hard Disk Drive @ 5400 RPM, 320 GB SATA Hard Disk Drive @ 7,200 RPM, 128 GB Solid State Drive
- Optical Disc Drive: CD/DVD reader/writer, Blu-ray Disc reader, or Blu-ray Disc reader/writer
- Graphics: ATI Mobility Radeon HD 3470 with 256 MB of vRAM, ATI Mobility Radeon HD 4650 with 512 MB of vRAM, or ATI Mobility Radeon HD 4650 w/1 GB of vRAM
- Display: 16.4" XBRITE-ECO with 1600 × 900 resolution, or 16.4" HiColor-FullHD w/1920 × 1080 resolution, or 16.4" XBRITE-FullHD w/1920 × 1080 resolution
- Extras: SD and magic gate pro card reader, 3 USB 2.0 slots, i.LINK IEEE 1394 slot and a HDMI cable slot
