= Series =

Series may refer to:

== Arts, entertainment, and media ==
=== Music ===
- Series, the ordered sets used in serialism including tone rows
- Harmonic series (music)
- Serialism, including the twelve-tone technique

=== Types of series in arts, entertainment, and media ===
- Anime series
- Book series
- Comic book series
- Film series
- Manga series
- Podcast series
- Radio series
- Television series
- "Television series", the Australian, British, and a number of others countries' equivalent term for the North American "television season", a set of episodes produced by a television serial
- Video game series
- Web series

== Mathematics and science ==
- Series (botany), a taxonomic rank between genus and species
- Series (mathematics), the sum of a sequence of terms
- Series (stratigraphy), a stratigraphic unit deposited during a certain interval of geologic time
- Series, a level of provenance in archival science
- Seriation (archaeology), a method of dating objects
- Seriation (semiotics), a concept in interpreting phenomena
- Series circuits, a kind of electrical network

== People with the name ==
- Caroline Series (born 1951), English mathematician, daughter of George Series
- George Series (1920–1995), English physicist

== Other uses ==
- Series (United States currency), referring to the year that a bill's design was adopted
- Series, a sequence of competitive sports events, sometimes to decide a championship
- Land Rover Series, early Land Rover workhorses (forerunners to the Defender)

== See also ==
- 1 series (disambiguation)
- 3 series
- 5 series
- 7 series (disambiguation)
- A series (disambiguation)
- B series (disambiguation)
- C series (disambiguation)
- D series (disambiguation)
- E series (disambiguation)
- F series (disambiguation)
- G series (disambiguation)
- H series (disambiguation)
- I series (disambiguation)
- J series (disambiguation)
- K series (disambiguation)
- L series (disambiguation)
- M series (disambiguation)
- N series (disambiguation)
- O series (disambiguation)
- P series (disambiguation)
- Q series (disambiguation)
- R series (disambiguation)
- S series (disambiguation)
- T series (disambiguation)
- U series (disambiguation)
- V series (disambiguation)
- W series (disambiguation)
- X series (disambiguation)
- Y series (disambiguation)
- Z series (disambiguation)
- 0 series (disambiguation)
- Serial (literature)
- Serial (radio and television)
- Serie A (disambiguation)
- Serie A2 (disambiguation)
- Serie B (disambiguation)
- Serie C
- Serie D
- Series A
- Series B
- World Series (disambiguation)
