= K series =

K series may refer to:

== Transportation ==
- Lincoln K series, a line of luxury vehicle
- Scania K series, a series of bus chassis with longitudinal rear-mounted engines
- International K and KB series, a line of heavy trucks of the 1940s
- K series engine (disambiguation)
- K-series (trains), a type of train in China

== Technology ==
- Skoda K series, a heavy howitzer
- Sony Ericsson K series, a series of phones
- "K" series, a set of messages in the military Variable Message Format data protocol

== Other uses ==
- QI (K series), the eleventh series of quiz show QI
- K Series (TV series), a television programming block on Puthuyugam TV
- K Series, a series of bullion coins produced by Korea Minting and Security Printing Corporation

== See also ==
- K (disambiguation)
