= G series =

G series may refer to:

== Science and technology ==
- G Series, ITU-T telecommunications systems recommendations for transmission systems and media, digital systems and networks
- LG G series, a line of Android devices produced by LG Electronics
- Sony Vaio G series, laptop computers
- Sony Ericsson G series, a series of cell phones
- Lumix G-series, cameras by Panasonic; see Panasonic Lumix DMC-GF5
- G-series, a class of nerve agent

== Transportation ==
- G series (Toronto subway), a line of subway cars
- Chevrolet G-series vans
- G-series trains, the designation for the fastest long-distance trains in China
- Infiniti G-series (Q40/Q60), a line of luxury sports cars
- Nissan G engine, a series of engines produced in the 1960s
- Series G, a series of Porsche 911

== Other uses ==
- G-Series (record label), a music label
- QI (G series), the seventh series of the TV quiz show QI
- G series, a variety of Gatorade

== See also ==
- G (disambiguation)
