= IBM x series =

IBM x series may refer to:

- IBM ThinkPad X series — laptop line (2000–2005, later Lenovo ThinkPad X series)
- IBM eServer xSeries — server line (2000-2004)

== See also ==
- Xseries (disambiguation)
