= J series =

J series may refer to:

== Technology ==
- Fujifilm FinePix J series, of digital cameras
- Gibson J series, of musical instruments
- Juniper J series, of routers
- Honda J engine
- Jeep Honcho, pickups
- Samsung Galaxy J series, a series of phones
- Sony Ericsson J series, a series of phones
- TADIL-J, J-series messages in a military data protocol

== Other uses ==
- QI (J series), a season of the TV quiz show QI

== See also ==
- J (disambiguation)
