= H series =

H series may refer to:

- H series (Toronto subway), a line of subway cars in Canada
- Ford H series, a line of trucks manufactured from 1961 to 1966
- Isuzu H-Series, a line of trucks
- QI (H series), a series of the TV quiz show QI

== See also ==
- H (disambiguation)
