= S series =

S series or Series-S may refer to:

== Technology ==
- S-Series (rocket family), funded by the Japan Aerospace Exploration Agency
- Fujifilm FinePix S-series
- Minolta Vectis S series, cameras
- Samsung Galaxy S series, smartphones and tablets
- Sony Ericsson S series, a series of cell phones
- Walkman S Series, Sony portable media players
- Xbox Series S, an Xbox videogame console from Microsoft

=== Computing ===
- IdeaPad S series, by Lenovo
- Sony Vaio S series, netbooks
- S series, Acer Aspire laptops
- Apple S series, processors used in the Apple Watch
- S series, Lenovo ThinkPad laptops
- S series, of HP ProBook notebook computers
- S series, Force10 network switches

== Transportation ==
- Bedford S series, trucks
- Chevrolet S-series, pickup trucks
- GMC S-Series, school bus
- International S series, trucks
- International S series (bus chassis)
- S series (Toronto subway), rapid transit rolling stock
- Saturn S-Series, compact cars
- Waco S series, biplanes
- S series, of BMW engines
- S series, services of Calcutta State Transport Corporation
- S series, Meguro motorcycles
- S-series, Toyota LiteAce vans

== Other uses ==
- Ibanez S series, guitar
- S-series Dungeons & Dragons modules, of the fantasy tabletop role-playing game
- S-Series of ILS specifications, specifications for integrated logistics support
- S series, supplement to the Official Journal of the European Union

== See also ==
- S (disambiguation)
