= U series =

U series or U-series may refer to:

== Science and technology ==
- HTC U series, Android smartphones
- IdeaPad U series, Lenovo consumer laptop computers
- Sony U series, subnotebook computers
- U-series dating, uranium–thorium dating
- Yepp U series, USB key MP3 players

== See also ==
- U (disambiguation)
