= D series =

D series may refer to:

== Technology ==
- Nikon D series, of digital cameras
- SM-65D Atlas or Atlas D, an ICBM
- Tool steel D series, high carbon-chromium tool steel

== Vehicles ==
- Allis-Chalmers D Series, tractors
- Bedford D series, trucks
- Chevrolet Series D, trucks
- Dodge D series, pickup trucks
- Ford D series, trucks
- Group D Production Sports Cars, CAMS class of race car
- Honda D engine
- International D-Series, of pickup trucks
- MCI D-Series, motorcoaches built by Motor Coach Industries
- SJ D, locomotives used by Statens Järnvägar of Sweden
- Volkswagen Group D platform, Audi, Bentley, and Volkswagen chassis configuration
- D-series trains, a designation of trains in China; see Passenger rail transport in China#Classes

== Other uses ==
- QI (D series), the fourth series of the BBC TV quiz show QI

== See also ==
- D (disambiguation)
