= N series =

N series may refer to:

== Technology ==
- Acer N series, a series of PDAs
- Contax N-series, Contax cameras
- Nokia Nseries, smartphone and tablet product family

== Transportation ==
- Isuzu Elf, known outside Japan as the N series
- Honda N engine
- Ford Model N
- Ford N-series tractor
- N series, of EMC Winton-engined switchers
- N-series, Ghandhara Industries vehicles
- Scania N series
- Waco N series, biplanes

== Other uses ==
- N series, of Australian passport
- N series (nonperforming), mortgage trusts of the Resolution Trust Corporation
- N (video game), and its sequels
- QI (N series), of the television show QI

== See also ==
- N (disambiguation)
