= Sony Vaio Y series =

Line of notebook computer by Sony

The Vaio Y series is a line of notebook computer from Sony introduced in January 2010. It is a netbook-inspired model designed for travel use: compared with the other 13.3" models in the Vaio range, the Y lacks an optical drive, and is heavier and cheaper than the premium Sony Vaio Z series, but lighter than the consumer-grade Sony Vaio S series, with better battery life than either, thanks to the use of CULV processors. The weight is 3.92lbs (1.78kg).

The Y series features a 13.3-inch 16:9 1366×768 screen, 2-8 GB of DDR3 RAM, hard drive or SSD, CULV Intel dual-core CPU, Mobile Intel Intel GMA 4500MHD or ATI Mobility Radeon HD 4550 graphics (refreshed models only), integrated VGA webcam, gigabit ethernet, 802.11b/g/n wireless, and Windows 7 64-bit. Initially the Y series shipped with a Core 2 CULV CPUs; the mid-2010 refresh saw these replaced with newer Arrandale CULV chips.

Battery specs are 5000 mAh (330g - standard) or 7500 mAh (490g - extended).

== Models (USA & Europe) ==
=== Launch ===
- VPC-Y115FX: Intel Core 2 SU7300 (1.30 GHz), 4 GB RAM, 320 GB 5200rpm hard drive, Intel GS45 graphics, Windows 7 Home Premium ($799)
- VPC-Y118GX: Intel Core 2 SU7300 (1.30 GHz), 4 GB RAM, 500 GB 5200rpm hard drive, Intel GS45 graphics, Windows 7 Home Premium, included additional high-capacity battery ($999)
- VPC-Y11S1E (Sold in Europe): Intel Core 2 SU7300 (1.30 GHz), 4 GB RAM, 320 GB 5400rpm hard drive, Intel Media Accelerator 4500 MHD graphics, Windows 7 Home Premium 64-bit

=== Refresh ===
- VPC-Y21EFX and VPC-Y21SFX: Intel Core i3-330UM 1.20 GHz, 4 GB RAM, 320 GB 5200rpm hard drive, Intel GS45 graphics, Windows 7 Home Premium
- VPC-2190X: Intel Pentium U5400 (1.20 GHz), Core i3-330UM (1.20 GHz) or Core i5-430UM (1.20 GHz with Turbo Boost to 1.73 GHz), 320 or 500 GB hard drive or 256 GB SSD, 2 GB, 4 GB, 6 GB or 8 GB of RAM, Intel GMA 4500 or ATI Mobility Radeon HD 4550 graphics, Windows 7 Home Premium or Professional
