= Y series =

Y series or Y-series may refer to:

- Bedford Y series, busses
- IdeaPad Y series, laptop computers
- Sony Vaio Y series, notebook computers

== See also ==
- Y (disambiguation)
