= F series =

F series may refer to:

== Transportation ==
- Ford F-Series, trucks
- Mack F series, trucks
- Waco F series, biplanes

== Technology ==
- Fujifilm FinePix F series, cameras
- Sony Vaio F series, laptop computers
- Sony Ericsson F series, a series of cell phones
- Walkman F Series, a series of portable media players

== Other uses ==
- QI (F series), a series of the TV quiz show QI

== See also ==
- F (disambiguation)
