= K Series (TV series) =

Former Indian programming block

K Series கே-தொடர்கள்
- Network: Puthuyugam TV (2014-2015); Blacksheep TV (2023)
- Launched: 12 May 2014
- Closed: present
- Country of origin: India
- Format: Korean drama
- Running time: Monday- Friday (Puthuyugam TV); Monday - Friday 20:00-21:00) (Blacksheep TV)

K Series was a television programming block on the Tamil TV channel on Puthuyugam TV in Tamil Nadu featuring Tamil-dubbed Korean dramas. It launched on 12 May 2014 and aired Monday through Friday 9:00PM IST until 30 October 2015.

The second season of the Tamil-dubbed Korean dramas, which airs on Blacksheep TV from 23 January 2023.

== Dramas on Puthuyugam TV ==
Drama name	Aired	Reference
Boys Over Flowers	12 May 2014 - 30 June 2014	
The Greatest Love	1 July 2014 - 30 July 2014	
Iris	31 July 2014 - 9 September 2014; 13 July 2015 - 4 September 2015	
Playful Kiss	10 September 2014 - 13 October 2014	
The 1st Shop of Coffee Prince	14 October 2014 - 14 November 2014; 17 November 2014 - 19 November 2014	
Pasta	20 November 2014 - 2 January 2015	
You're Beautiful	5 January 2015 - 10 February 2015; 2 November 2015–present	
The Heirs	15 February 2015 - 21 March 2015	
Master's Sun	23 March 2015 - 1 May 2015	
To the Beautiful You	4 May 2015 - 10 June 2015	
My Love from the Star	11 June 2015 - 29 July 2015	
Secret Garden	30 July 2015 - 4 September 2015; 7 September 2015 - 15 September 2015	
Moon Embracing the Sun	16 September 2015 - 30 October 2015	

=== 2015 ===
2017
Drama name	Aired	Time	Reference
Secret Garden	19 December 2016	Monday - Friday at 9:00PM IST	Re-telecast
Iris	19 December 2016	Monday - Friday at 10:30PM IST	Re-telecast
Playful Kiss		Monday - Friday 9:00PM – 10:00PM	

== Dramas on Blacksheep TV ==
Drama name	Aired	Time	Reference
Chinnathayaval	23 January 2023 – 17 March 2023	Monday - Friday 20:00	
Ennadi Mayavi	23 January 2023 – present	Monday - Friday at 20:30	
Yaaro Ivan	20 March 2023 – present	Monday - Friday 20:00	
