= O series =

O series or O-series may refer to:

- BL O-series engine, a line of 4-cylinder car engines
- Waco O series, biplanes
- O series, oil hardened tool steel

== See also ==
- 0 series (disambiguation)
