= IdeaPad U series =

Series of laptops

IdeaPad U Series
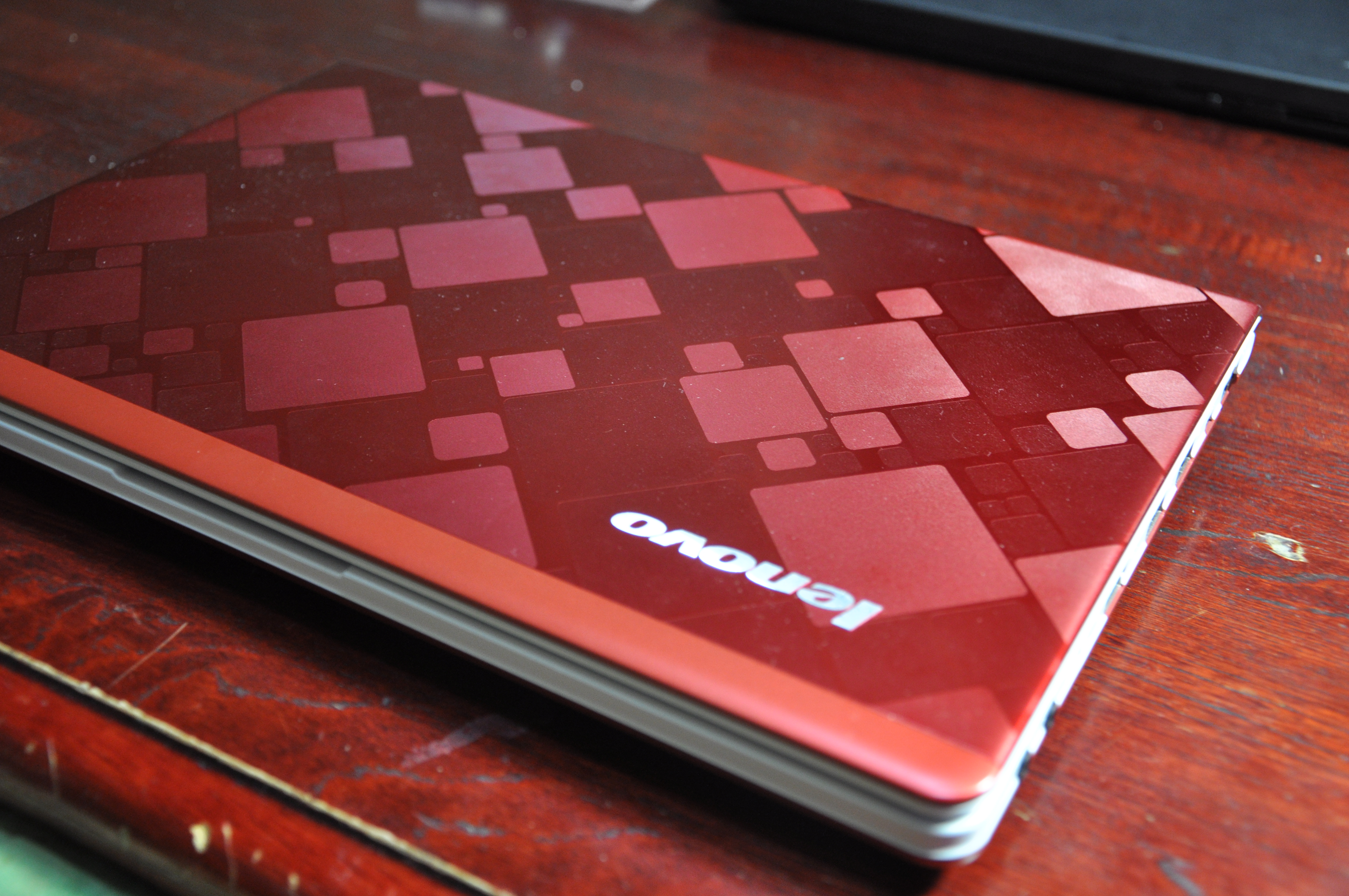
- Lenovo IdeaPad U160
- Developer: Lenovo
- Product family: IdeaPad
- Type: laptop
- Released: 2008
- Discontinued: 2014
- Operating system: Microsoft Windows

The first laptop in the IdeaPad U series was the U110 launched in 2008 by Lenovo. Showcased at CES 2008, the laptop also launched the IdeaPad series itself, and received the Best of CES 2008 award. The IdeaPad U series was a line of Lenovo's consumer line of laptops, combining Lenovo's traditional engineering with design changes that were significantly different from ThinkPad products.

IdeaPad U series
	Type	2008	2009	2010	2011	2012	2013	2014
11.6"	Netbook	U110	U150	U160				
11.6"	Netbook			U165				
12"	Mainstream			U260				
13"		U330	U350		U300s	U310		
13"							U330p	
14"	Mainstream				U400	U410	U410 Touch	
14"							U430 Touch	
14"			U450p		U460			
15"	Mainstream				U550			U530 Touch

== 2014 ==
=== U530 ===
The IdeaPad U530 has a low-voltage 4th-Gen Core i7-4510U processor, a 2 GB Nvidia Geforce GT 730M graphics card, a 1080p display with a multi-touch pane. It includes Windows 8.1, 8 GB RAM and a 1 TB hybrid hard drive with a 16 GB mSATA SSD, 3 USB ports (one USB 3.0), HDMI and a multi-card reader, dual-band 802.11bgn, and as well as Bluetooth 4.0.

The machine is 5.07 lbs, 0.86 inches thick, and has between six and ten hours of battery life depending on usage. Other features include its backlit keyboard, Stereo speakers with Dolby Home Theater, and motion control.

== 2013 ==
The 2013 update adopted fourth generation Intel chips and saw the switch to Windows 8. Models launched that year included the IdeaPad U330p (Intel i5-4200U) and IdeaPad U430 Touch. A refresh of the 2012 model, the IdeaPad U410 was also released, with the touch enabled IdeaPad U410 Touch (Intel i5-3337U).

== 2011 ==
The IdeaPad U-series laptops released by Lenovo in 2011 were the U300s, U400, U550 and U460.

=== U300s ===
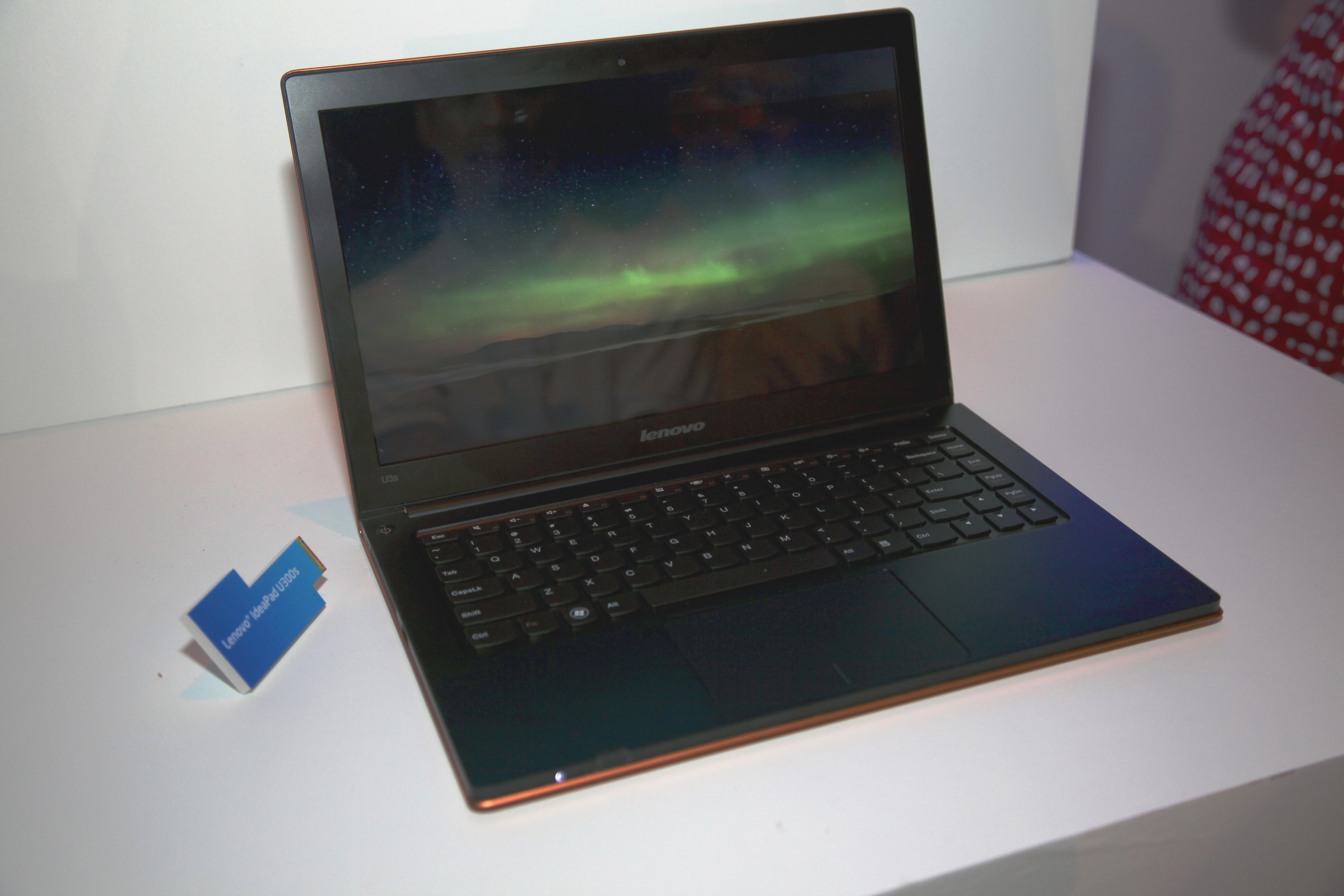
IdeaPad U300s

The U300s was described by Engadget as being "pared-down and tasteful". It was compared to the Macbook Air in terms of design since, like the Air, it was made from a single sheet of aluminum. Also, like the Air, the U300s was indicated to be susceptible to scratches, despite the fact that the metal had been sandblasted and anodized. Engadget also criticized the U300s for the lack of a memory card slot, stating that, "it's the only Ultrabook we know of that doesn't have a memory card slot."

The keyboard on the laptop received praise and was described as being sturdy and comfortable to type on. The glass touchpad was also received positively, with the reviewer stating that, "it has the best touchpad of any of the new Ultrabooks we've tested."

An innovation in the laptop, as described by Laptop Magazine, was the solid base plate. Air intake was designed to be through the keyboard, with two vents on the side handling expulsion of air.

The laptop's display screen was received positively, with the reviewer saying that, "we could make out the lint on Kermit the Frog in a 1080p Muppets trailer, and the entire cast was an explosion of colors." The laptop also offered Intel Wireless Display (WiDi) technology, allowing users to stream video from their laptops to an HDTV.

The laptop also offered faster boot and wake-from-sleep times of 34 seconds and 4 seconds respectively. Processor performance was also indicated to be positive, with PCMark Vantage score of 10,174, which was double the average for ultraportables. Graphical capabilities were not received positively, with the U300s scoring 3,398 in 3DMark06. When used to play World of Warcraft, the U300s offered 31fps, with graphical settings on 'Good' and at a resolution of 1366x768.

Detailed specifications of the U300s are as follows:

- Processor: Intel Core up to i7-2677M (2x 1.8 GHz)
- RAM: up to 4GB
- Graphics: Intel HD 3000
- Storage: 1x SATA (256GB SSD)
- Display: 13.3" (1366x768)
- Wireless: Wi-Fi: 802.11 b/g/n, Bluetooth 2.1 + EDR
- Dimensions: 12.8 x 8.5 x 0.59 inches
- Weight: 3 lb (1.4 kg)

=== U400 ===
PC Mag summed up the IdeaPad U400 by saying "The Lenovo IdeaPad U400 laptop combines solid performance with a design you won't be able to keep your hands off of." The reviewer continues by stating that the U400 was designed with mainstream users in mind, with the sandblasted aluminum chassis and glass touchpad. The design was contrasted with other laptops offered by different manufacturers. Where other, similar laptops were available in clamshell and wedge designs, the U400 laptop was flat, with protruding top and bottom lids, similar to the cover of a book.

The U400 was indicated to be "well-equipped", offering Intel Core i5 processors and discrete AMD graphics. The laptop included a 14-inch screen with a maximum resolution of 1366 x 768 pixels. The features of the U400 were described as being on par with the Macbook Air and the Dell XPS 14z, such as the USB ports, a headset jack, and an Ethernet port. The only point which was indicated to be negative was the price.

Engadget also reviewed the U400 positively, stating that they were "smitten with the understated design". However, the keyboard received some criticism, with the reviewer stating that the keys could have been larger, with certain keys like Tab, Shift, Backspace, and the arrow keys feeling undersized. In addition, the reviewer stated that, despite this drawback, the keyboard remained comfortable to use. The touchpad also received criticism, which Engadget stated was the result of supplier change from Synaptics to Cypress. The use of Intel Wireless Display was indicated to be a positive point, which allowed laptop users to mirror their display on an HDTV or a monitor using a special-purpose adapter.

Detailed specifications of the U400 laptop are as follows:

- Processor: up to Intel Core i5-2430M
- RAM: up to 8GB
- Graphics:
  - Intel HD 3000
  - AMD Radeon HD 6470M
- Display: 14" 1366x768 TN
- Storage: HDD 750GB 7200RPM
- Weight: 4.25 lb (1.93 kg)

=== U460 ===
Released in June 2010, the U460 laptop offered the following specifications:

- Processor: up to 2.66 GHz Intel Core i5-480M
- RAM: up to 4GB DDR3 1066 MHz
- Graphics:
  - Intel Graphics Media Accelerator HD
  - NVIDIA GeForce 305M

=== U550 ===
Notebook Review indicated that while the U550 was a traditionally designed laptop with no extraordinary design features, it was extremely thin and light for a 15.6-inch notebook. The plastic used was light and of "reasonable quality". Both the palm rest area and the back of the lid did not retain fingerprints or dust. However, the glossy plastic around the screen was described as being "impossible to keep clean".

The chassis and the palm rest were reported to exhibit some flex. However, pressure applied to the back of the lid did not result in ripples on the screen, which was reported to be impressive for such a thin laptop. The display hinges were also reported to be strong, since the laptop could be opened without holding down the lower half of the laptop.

Both the keyboard and the touchpad received praise. The keyboard was described as having good tactile feedback with appropriate key travel. The touchpad was described as having a matte surface which was easy to use and buttons with good tactile feedback. The multi-touch features were indicated by Notebook Review to "work sporadically at best".

Detailed specifications of the U550 laptop are as follows:

- Processor: Intel Core 2 Duo SU7300 (1.3 GHz, 3MB L2 cache, 800 MHz FSB)
- RAM: 4GB DDR3
- Graphics:
  - Intel GMA 4500MHD
  - ATI Mobility Radeon HD 4330 512MB
- Storage: 320GB 5400RPM
- Wireless: Bluetooth 2.1 + EDR, wi-fi
- Dimensions (W x D x H): 14.8 x 9.9" x 0.9 ~ 1.2 inches

== 2010 ==
The IdeaPad U-series laptops released by Lenovo in 2010 were U160 and U260.

=== U160 and U165 ===
The U160 was released in May 2010 in the United States and in June in Japan. It was an 11.6 inch laptop with an Intel i7 ultra-low voltage processor. The same laptop was also available with an Intel i5 processor, as a lower end version. The U165 was released at the same time, and was another 11.6 inch laptop. However, the major difference was the use of AMD processors instead of Intel.

Engadget said about the U160, “The U160 is without a doubt the most powerful 11.6-inch laptop we've ever toyed with thanks to its 1.20GHz Intel Core i7-640UM processor and 4GB of RAM (the Alienware M11x comes close, but it was then powered by a Core 2 Duo processor).” However, they also added that “the U160 falls in between a standard voltage Core i3 laptop and some of the newer AMD Nile-powered ultraportables on the performance scale”.

=== U260 ===
The U260 notebook was received with high praise from Engadget, with special mention made of its appearance. The reviewer called the notebook “one of the most dapper and svelte laptops we've seen in a long time”. The notebook was commended for its performance with Intel i3 or i5 ultra-low voltage processors, magnesium-aluminum alloy shell, leather palm rest, and brushed glass touchpad. However, the battery life was deemed to be too low, at 3 to 3.5 hours.

Engadget also commented on the appearance of the U260, saying that, “The U260 is indeed a total 180 for the company, and it's one of the most dapper and svelte laptops we've seen in a long time − there's no question about it, its magnesium-aluminum alloy shell, leather palm rest, and glass touchpad even give the newest MacBook Airs a run for their money.”

== 2009 ==
The IdeaPad U-series laptops released in 2009 by Lenovo were the U350, U450p, and U150.

=== U150 ===
The U150 laptop was scheduled for release in November 2009 in the United States. However, as of October 2009, it was already available in Japan. LAPTOP Magazine appreciated both the design and the battery life of the laptop, while criticizing the temperature control and keyboard. Notebook Review indicated that the laptop offered portability and value with enough performance to keep most customers happy, while criticizing the build quality.

Detailed specifications of the notebook are as follows:

- Processor: Intel Core 2 Duo SU7300 (1.30 GHz, 800 MHz FSB, 3MB L2 cache)
- RAM: 4GB DDR3 (1066 MHz)
- Storage: 1x SATA (320GB HDD 5400 RPM)
- Display: 11.6" (glossy, 1366x768)
- Graphics: Intel GMA 4500MHD
- Wireless: Intel 5100AGN, Bluetooth 2.1 + EDR
- Dimensions (inches): 11.4 x 7.5 x 0.5-1.35
- Weight: 2.97 lb (1.35 kg)
- Operating System: Windows 7 Home Premium 64-bit

=== U350 ===
The U350 was released in July 2009 to mixed reviews from different publications. LAPTOP Magazine appreciated the laptop's design and low starting price, but was disappointed by the low battery life. Computer Shopper discounted the laptop's performance but appreciated the light weight and affordable price. Stark Insider appreciated the laptop's price, performance, keyboard, display and speakers. The negative points noted were the fan noise and heat on the left palm rest.

Detailed specifications of the laptop are as follows:

- Processor: 1.3-GHz Intel Core 2 Solo
- RAM: 4GB
- Storage: 320GB 5400RPM SATA
- Display: 13.3" (1366x768)
- Graphics: Intel GMA 4500MHD
- Wireless: Wi-Fi: 802.11a/b/g/n, Bluetooth 2.1 + EDR
- Dimensions (inches): 12.9 x 9.0 x 1.0
- Weight: 3.6 lb (1.6 kg)
- Operating system: Microsoft Windows Vista Home Premium (32-bit)

=== U450p ===
The IdeaPad U450p was launched in August 2009. TechRadar UK praised the laptop for performance, build quality, and inclusion of an optical drive. Although the review stated that “some of the chassis panels flex under moderate pressure”, it was indicated that “realistically this shouldn't prove too much of durability issue, however”. The design was also noted: instead of a glossy design, a mottled, checkered design was used instead, which did not get scratched or dirty easily.

== 2008 ==
The IdeaPad U-series laptops released in 2008 by Lenovo were the U110 and U330.

=== U110 ===
The IdeaPad U110 was an 11.1 inch laptop, a first for Lenovo in the United States. The most striking feature of the laptop was the red top lid with a flowery pattern on it – another first for a Lenovo laptop. The keyboard was also vastly different from traditional Lenovo keyboards, with glossy keys that were set very close to each other. The advantage of the keyboard was that because of the reduced spacing, keys were far larger than those of similar sized laptop. However, the design itself and the smaller spacebar key required some getting used to, as indicated by Notebook Review.

Detailed specifications of the notebook are as follows:

- Processor: Intel Core 2 Duo (Low Voltage)
- Display: 11.1" Glossy WXGA (1366x768)
- Graphics: Intel X3100
- Storage: 1x SATA (160GB HDD or 64GB SSD)
- Webcam: 1.3MP
- Sound: two speakers, 1.5W
- Network: 10/100 Ethernet, Intel 4965AGN wireless, Bluetooth
- Battery: up to 8 hours

=== U330 ===
The U110 was followed by the U330 laptop in November 2008. It retained features like the touch-sensitive media controls, and facial recognition. New features included were an altered keyboard, which LAPTOP Magazine indicated was more comfortable, and switchable graphics.

Detailed specifications of the notebook are as follows:

- Processor: 2 GHz Intel Core 2 Duo
- RAM: Up to 4GB
- Storage: 1x SATA (250GB 5400RPM), 1x Optical Drive (8x DVD R/W)
- Display: 13.3" (1280x800)
- Graphics:Intel GMA 4500MHD + ATI Mobility Radeon HD 3450
- Wireless: Wi-Fi 802.11a/b/g/n
- Ports: 2 USB, Ethernet, FireWire, HDMI, Headphone, Microphone, Modem, VGA; 6-1 card reader, ExpressCard
- Dimensions (inches): 12.5 x 9.3 x 0.9
- Weight: 4.4 lb (2.0 kg)
- Operating system: Microsoft Windows Vista Home Premium
