= Serie B (disambiguation) =

Serie B is the second level Italian football league.

Serie B may also refer to:

- Campeonato Brasileiro Série B, a Brazilian football league
- Ecuadorian Serie B, an Ecuadorian football league
- Serie B (baseball), an Italian baseball league
- Serie B (men's water polo), an Italian water polo league
- Serie B (women's football), an Italian women's football league
- Serie B Basket, an Italian basketball league
- Serie B de México, an association football league
- Lega B, the governing body of the Serie B Italian football league
