= K-series engine =

K-series engine may refer to:

- Rover K-series engine
- Honda K engine
- Mazda K engine
- Toyota K engine
- Chrysler 2.2 & 2.5 engine, sometimes referred to as the Chrysler K engine, after the Chrysler K platform
