= R series =

R series may refer to:

== Transportation ==
- BL R-series engine, gasoline car engines
- Dennis R series, coach chassis
- Ford R series, busses
- International R series, trucks
- Mack R series, heavy-duty trucks
- Scania R series, trucks

== Science and technology ==
- R series (number series) (Renard number series), in mathematics
- Samsung Galaxy R series, Android smartphones
- Sony Ericsson R series, a series of cell phones

== See also ==
- R (disambiguation)
