= P series =

P series or P-series may refer to:

== Science and technology ==
- p-series, a convergence test in mathematics
- Huawei P series, mobile phone series by Huawei
- Ruger P series, pistols
- P-series, of Sony Cyber-shot digital cameras
- Sony Ericsson P series, a series of phones
- P-series, of Vespa motor scooters

=== Computing ===
- IBM pSeries, computer series
- ThinkPad P series, mobile workstation line by Lenovo
- Sony Vaio P series, notebook computers

== See also ==
- P (disambiguation)
