= Serie A (disambiguation) =

Serie A is an Italian football league.

Serie A may also refer to:

== Italy ==
- Italian Baseball League
- Italian Volleyball League
- Lega Basket Serie A, basketball
- Lega Serie A, the governing body of football
- Serie A (futsal)
- Serie A (ice hockey)
- Serie A (rugby union)
- Serie A (women's football)
- Serie A (women's futsal)
- Serie A (women's ice hockey league)
- Serie A (women's rugby union)
- Serie A1 (water polo)
- Serie A1 (women's handball)

== Brazil ==
- Campeonato Brasileiro Série A, Brazilian football league
- Campeonato Brasileiro Feminino Série A1, Brazilian women's football league
- Campeonato Brasileiro Feminino Série A2, Brazilian women's football league

== Ecuador ==
- Ecuadorian Serie A, Ecuadorian football league

== Mexico ==
- Serie A de México, a level 3 football league

== See also ==
- Series A round of venture capital financing
