= 0 series =

0 series or 0-series may refer to:

- 0 Series Shinkansen, a Japanese train series

== See also ==
- Zero batch, pre-production run in product manufacturing
- Zero (2021 TV series), an Italian drama
- Zero (Singaporean TV series), a 2004 drama
- Zero Series, of Infinix Mobile phones
- Zero (disambiguation)
- O series (disambiguation)
