= Q series =

Q series may refer to:

== Technology ==
- Bombardier Q series (Dash 8), aircraft
- IdeaCentre Q series, nettop computers
- Pentax Q series, cameras

== Mathematics ==
- Q-series
- Hypergeometric q-series

== See also ==
- Q (disambiguation)
