= Z series =

Z Series may refer to:

== Technology ==
- Fujifilm FinePix Z-series, digital cameras
- IBM zSeries, mainframe computers
- Z series space suits, a series of prototype spacesuits
- Samsung Galaxy Z series, foldable smartphones
- Sony Xperia Z series, smartphones
- Walkman Z Series, Sony digital audio players
- Sony Ericsson Z series, a series of phones

== Transportation ==
- Nissan Z-car, a series of Japanese sports cars
- Honda Z series, mini-bikes
- BMW Z Series, of two-seat roadsters
- Z-series trains, overnight express trains in China

== See also ==
- Z (disambiguation)
