= Sony Vaio G series =

The Sony Vaio G series was a range of ultraportable subnotebook computers launched in 2007 with a 12.1-inch display.

Launch specs were a 1024x768 12.1" screen, Windows Vista, Intel Core Solo low-voltage U1500 (1.33 GHz) CPU, Intel GMA 950 graphics, 1 GB RAM and a 100 GB 5400 rpm hard drive. It weighed 1.13 kg and included DVD burner, Gigabit Ethernet, Bluetooth and 802.11abg wireless. In October 2007 the model was updated with Intel Core 2 Duo U7500 (1.06 GHz) CPU.

One configuration exclusive to the Japan market featured an Intel Celeron SU2300 (1.2 GHz), 2 GB-8 GB RAM, Core 2 Duo SU9400 (1.4 GHz) or SU9600 (1.6 GHz) CPU, a choice of hard drive or dual SSDs, and Windows 7. It was possible to order a G Series without an optical drive, in which case the weight is reduced to 868 grams.
