= X series =

X series or xSeries or Series-X may refer to:

== Media and entertainment ==
- X (video game series), a space combat and trading game series
- X the album, a series of Christian rock compilation albums
- X-Men (film series) or "X" films

== Technology ==
- Fujifilm X series, a series of digital cameras
- Nokia Xseries, a family of mobile phones.
- Sony Ericsson X series, a series of cell phones
- Xbox Series X, a videogame console from Microsoft

=== Computing ===
- eServer xSeries, of the IBM System x
- Intel Core X-Series, a series of computer CPUs
- ThinkPad X series, of laptops
- Northgate SeriesX, a line of computers from Northgate Information Solutions
- Sony Vaio X series, a series of laptops

== Transportation ==
- BMW X-series vehicles, see List of BMW vehicles
- X-planes, a series of US experimental aircraft
- Yamaha's X-series motorcycles

== See also ==
- X (disambiguation)
