= Sony Vaio S series =

Line of notebook computers by Sony

The Vaio S series was a line of notebook computers from Sony introduced in summer 2004. They have been touted as business laptops, and their designs have focused on being thin and light. They also have features friendly to businesspeople, such as TPM chips, matte (anti-glare) displays, RAID SSDs, and extended sheet batteries, as well as continuing to include RJ-45 and VGA (D-Sub) connections.

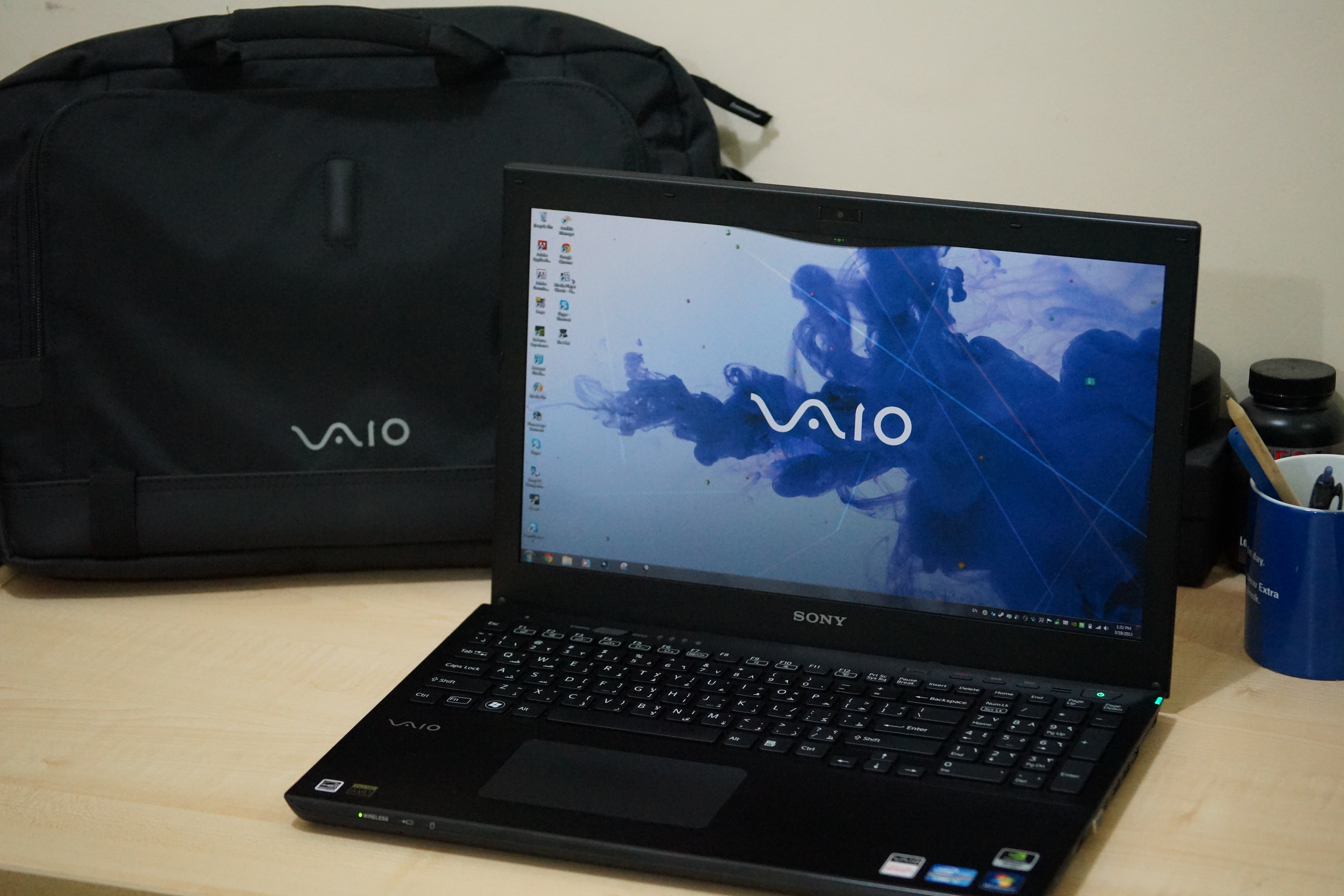

== 2010 ==
Sony introduced the VAIO S series in January 2010 to replace the SR series. The aspect ratio of the display was changed to 16:9 (1600×900/1360×768) from the older 16:10 (1280x800). The CPU was upgraded from Intel's Core2 Duo to Intel's First-Generation Core i3/i5/i7, and the system RAM was updated to DDR3. The graphics options were either the CPU-integrated Intel GMA HD Graphics or a discrete NVIDIA GeForce 310M. As with the SR, the S offered an optional Blu-ray disc drive. Unlike the SR, the new VAIO S Series had a mini-PCI slot that allowed for an optional internal WWAN (mobile broadband) adapter. The keyboard was also redesigned with new backlit chiclet (island-style) keys.

== 2011: The SA/SB/SC/SE series ==
The VAIO SA/SB/SC series was released in February 2011. It once again featured a 13.3-inch screen with a matte anti-glare finish, with a native 16:9 aspect ratio and maximum resolution of either 1366×768 or 1600×900. It was notably thinner and lighter than its predecessor, weighing just under 4 lbs (half a pound lighter) and 0.95" thick (1/4" thinner). It also had a completely redesigned chassis, replacing the large rounded hinge with a sleek and angular design, featuring chrome accents on the hinge and VAIO logo. The processors were updated to Second-Generation Intel Core i5 and i7 CPUs, and the graphic options were either AMD Radeon HD 6470M (512 MB DDR3) or 6630M (1 GB DDR3). The laptop also featured a physical switch that could disable or enable the discrete graphics card at will and make the computer use the integrated processor GPU to increase battery life. It had 4 GB of DDR3-1333 memory soldered to the motherboard, and one open RAM slot which was customer-accessible and supported an additional 4 GB of RAM. It also features a sheet battery that increases the battery life to 15 hours. The 3rd VAIO S Series was the first VAIO with a non-removable battery.

Reviewers noted that the display felt quite flimsy, and that applying everyday amounts of torque, such as opening the display from one corner, would result in noticeable bending. Sony responded that this was by design, saying that under torque it would bend rather than break.

In August 2011, Sony introduced the SE model as a larger variant of the existing S Series notebook. It featured a larger 15.5-inch IPS panel with a native resolution of 1920×1080, and a full number pad was added to the keyboard. Its hardware was otherwise identical to the 13.3" S Series, with an optional Blu-ray Disc drive and up to an Intel Core i7-2640M CPU and AMD Radeon HD 6630M GPU.

== 2011 Series SATA 6 Gbps controversy ==
The early release of SA/SB/SC had chipset support for SATA 6 Gbit/s, useful for fast speeds in solid state drive. In late 2011, Sony released a BIOS update which disabled SATA 6 Gbit/s speeds (thereafter capped at 3 Gbit/s) for no apparent reason, and without notifying users in the update changelog. A hacked BIOS was subsequently created and spread via the internet which re-enabled SATA 6 Gbit/s speeds.

== 2012 ==
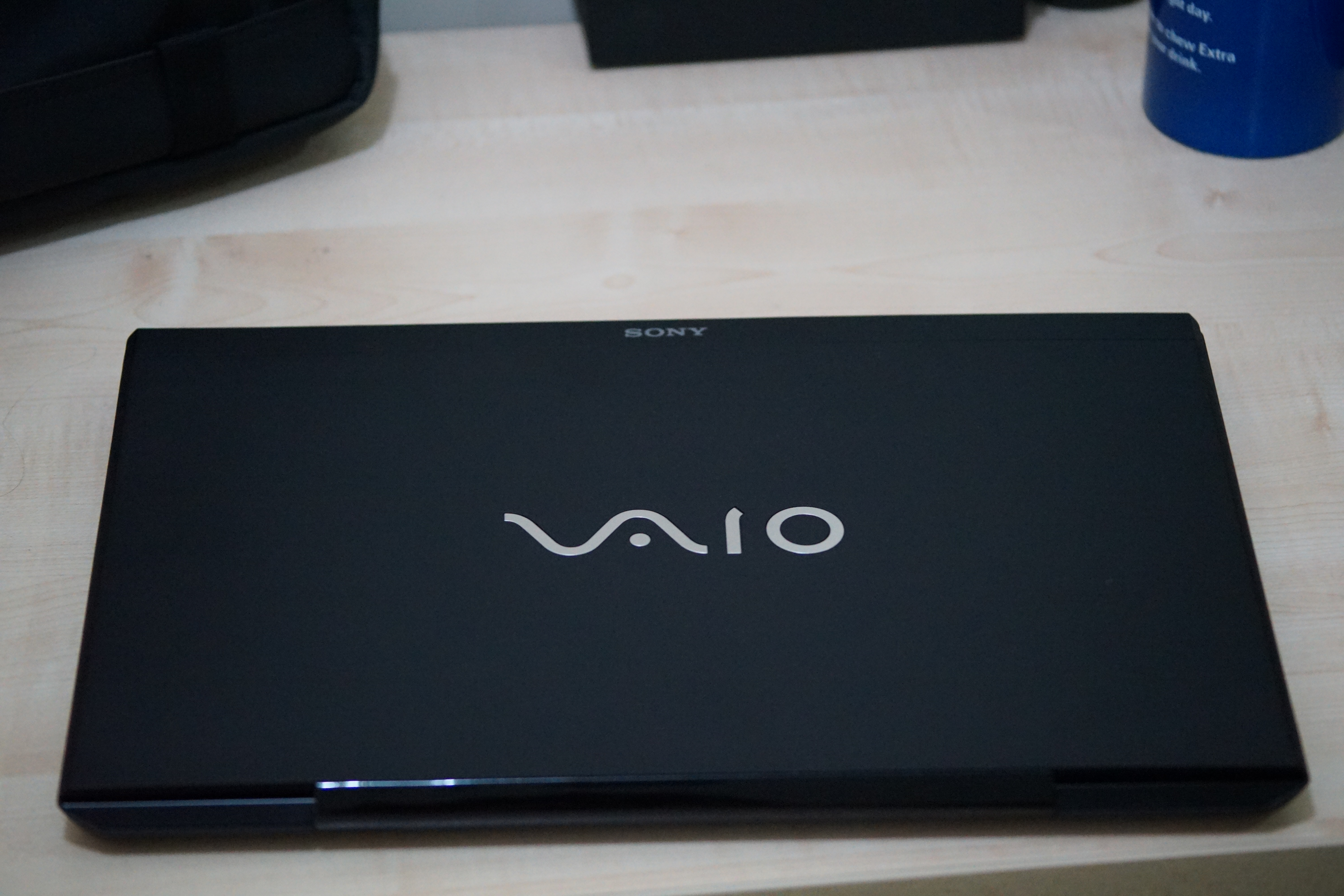

Another refresh of the VAIO S Series lineup was released in the spring of 2012, coinciding with the launch of Intel's 22 nm Ivy Bridge processors, the 3rd Generation Core i3/i5/i7 processors. The number of models were consolidated to only three versions: S13, S15, and S13 Premium. The S13 followed the basic model of the previous generation with a 13.3" screen at a native resolution of 1366x768, and retained the same overall angular design and backlit chiclet keyboard. From a physical standpoint the most major change was that the touchpad was changed to a "clickpad" and the dedicated buttons were removed. It weighed 3.8 lbs and was 0.95" thick. Most of the changes from the last generation of VAIO S laptops were update hardware. It featured dual-core 3rd Generation Intel Core i5/i7 processors. For the graphics options, Sony switched from AMD back to NVIDIA with the GeForce GT 640M LE with 1 GB DDR3 dedicated video RAM. NVIDIA's Optimus technology allowed the laptop to conserve battery life by switching from the discrete GPU and the low-power Intel HD Graphics 4000 chip integrated in the CPU when high-powered graphics were not required. Like the 13.3" S notebook before it, it had 4 GB of RAM soldered to the board, and 0, 2 GB, or 4 GB of removable memory in a user-accessible memory slot. It also had an optional internal Blu-ray reader or burner available, as well as a sheet battery for additional power.

The S13 Premium was constructed of carbon fiber (as opposed to the magnesium casing of the standard S13) and as such was slightly thinner (0.90") and lighter (3.69 lbs). It also featured a higher resolution 1600x900 display that was not available on the standard S13, and an option to upgrade to 2 GB of dedicated video RAM instead of 1 GB.

The S15 was the larger variant in the 4th VAIO S Series, with (like its predecessor, the SE) a 15.5" IPS Panel with a matte finish and a 1920x1080 native resolution. Also as with the SE before it, its additional size let it fit a full number pad in the keyboard as well as a 3.5mm microphone jack; both S13 models have only a headphone jack. It was upgradable to the quad-core Core i7-3612QM CPU, which was not available on either of the 13.3" models, and the first quad-core processor in the S Series. The graphics card was the same GeForce GT 640M LE found in the 13.3" models, and like the S13 Premium, the S15 had an option to upgrade to 2 GB of dedicated video RAM. The S15 was remarkably slim for its size, weighing only 4.42 lbs and keeping the 0.95" thickness of the standard S13 model. There was no carbon fiber variant of the S15.

In October 2012, VAIO had a small refresh for the release of Microsoft's Windows 8 operating system. The quad-core Intel Core i7-3612QM processor that was available in the S15 was swapped for its updated replacement, the Core i7-3632QM. There were no other hardware changes, however Sony did reorganize their available configurations, slashing hardware upgrade prices and making the 1600x900 resolution display available as an upgrade on the non-premium S13.

In addition, they added new colors (Pink and Red) to the existing options of Black, White, Silver for the standard S13. These colors were not added to the S15 options, which remained Black, White, and Silver. The S13 Premium color options (Carbon Fiber Black, Carbon Fiber Gunmetal, and Carbon Fiber Gold) likewise were not changed.

== 2013 discontinuation ==
On August 26, 2013, the Sony Vaio S Series was removed from the Sony Shop, as it has been dropped from their line of laptop computers. The Sony Outlet will continue to carry refurbished models including the S, E and T series.

On June 27, 2014, the VAIO name was sold by Sony. The Sony Outlet no longer sells VAIO.

== Technical specifications ==
| Discontinued |

Table of models
| Model | Early 2010 | Early 2011 | Early 2012 | Late 2012 |
|---|---|---|---|---|
| Model number(s) | VPCS117GG | VPCSA190X CTO, VPCSA2GX/BI, VPCSA2BGX/BI, VPCSA290X CTO, VPCSA390X CTO, VPCSA490X CTO (Incomplete List) | SVS13112FXS, SVS1311AGXB, SVS13A1EGXB, SVS131190X Standard | SVS13122CX, SVS13127PXB, SVS13A2APXS, SVS131290X Standard, SVS131290X Premium, SVS131290X Premium Plus |
| Model number(s) | —N/a | VPCSE190X CTO, VPCSE290X CTO | SVS1511AGXB, SVS1511BFXB, SVS151190X Standard | SVS15125CXW, SVS1512DCXB, SVS1512EPXB, SVS1512GPXB, SVS151290X Enhanced, SVS151290X Performance |
| Operating System | Microsoft Windows 7 Home Premium 64-bit | | | Microsoft Windows 8 64-bit |
| Operating System | Microsoft Windows 7 Professional 64-bit | | | Microsoft Windows 8 Pro 64-bit |
| LED-Backlit Display | 13.3" (1366×768) 16:9 | | | |
| LED-Backlit Display | —N/a | 13.3" (1600×900) 16:9 Matte (SA) | 13.3" (1600×900) 16:9 Matte (S13 Premium) | 13.3" (1600×900) 16:9 Matte (S13 and S13 Premium) |
| LED-Backlit Display | —N/a | 15.5" (1920×1080) 16:9 Matte IPS (SE) | 15.5" (1920×1080) 16:9 Matte IPS (S15) | |
| Webcam/Microphone | Integrated 1.3MP Webcam and Microphone | | | |
| Central Processor | Intel Core i3-330M [Dual-Core 2.13 GHz] Intel Core i5-430M [Dual Core 2.26 GHz] Intel Core i5-520M [Dual-Core 2.4 GHz] | Intel Core i5-2410M [Dual-Core 2.3 GHz] (SA1, SA2); Intel Core i5-2430M [Dual-Core 2.4 GHz] (SA3, SE1); Intel Core i5-2450M [Dual-Core 2.5 GHz] (SA4, SE2); Intel Core i5-2520M [Dual-Core 2.5 GHz] (SA2); Intel Core i5-2540M [Dual-Core 2.6 GHz] (SA4, SE2); Intel Core i7-2620M [Dual-Core 2.7 GHz] (SA1, SA2); Intel Core i7-2640M [Dual-Core 2.8 GHz] (SA3, SA4, SE1, SE2) | Intel Core i5-3210M [Dual-Core 2.5 GHz] (S13, S15); Intel Core i5-3320M [Dual-Core 2.6 GHz] (S13, S15); Intel Core i7-3520M [Dual-Core 2.9 GHz] (S13, S15); Intel Core i7-3612QM [Quad-Core 2.1 GHz] (S15) | Intel Core i5-3210M [Dual-Core 2.5 GHz] (S13, S15); Intel Core i5-3320M [Dual-Core 2.6 GHz] (S13, S15); Intel Core i7-3520M [Dual-Core 2.9 GHz] (S13, S15); Intel Core i7-3632QM [Quad-Core 2.2 GHz] (S15) |
| Random Access Memory | 4GB DDR3 1066 | 4GB Soldered + Open RAM Slot DDR3 1333; 4 GB Soldered + 2 GB Removable DDR3 1333; 4 GB Soldered + 4 GB Removable DDR3 1333; 4 GB Soldered + 8 GB Removable DDR3 1333 | | |
| Graphics Processor | Intel GMA HD Graphics | Intel HD Graphics 3000 | Intel HD Graphics 4000 | |
| Graphics Processor | NVIDIA GeForce 310M [512 MB DDR3] | AMD Radeon HD 6470M [512 MB DDR3] AMD Radeon HD 6630M [1 GB DDR3] | NVIDIA GeForce GT 640M LE [1 GB DDR3] NVIDIA GeForce GT 640M LE [2 GB DDR3] (S13 Premium and S15 Only) | |
| Data Storage | Serial ATA 3 Gbit/s | Serial ATA 6 Gbit/s | | |
| Data Storage | 320GB 5400RPM Hard Drive; 500 GB 5400RPM Hard Drive | 320GB 5400RPM Hard Drive; 500 GB 7200RPM Hard Drive; 750 GB 5400RPM Hard Drive; 128 GB SSD; 256 GB [2x128 GB] SSD RAID 0; 512 GB [2x256 GB] SSD RAID 0 | 320GB 5400RPM Hard Drive; 500 GB 7200RPM Hard Drive; 640 GB 5400RPM Hard Drive; 640 GB 7200RPM Hard Drive; 750 GB 5400RPM Hard Drive; 1000 GB 5400RPM Hard Drive | 500GB 7200RPM Hard Drive; 750 GB 7200RPM Hard Drive; 1000 GB 5400RPM Hard Drive; 128 GB [2x64 GB] SSD RAID 0; 256 GB [2x128 GB] SSD RAID 0; 512 GB [2x256 GB] SSD RAID 0 |
| Data Storage | —N/a | 500GB 7200RPM Hard Drive; 750 GB 5400RPM Hard Drive; 256 GB [2x128 GB] SSD RAID 0; 512 GB [2x256 GB] SSD RAID 0; 1024 GB [2x512 GB] SSD RAID 0 | 500GB 5400RPM Hard Drive; 500 GB 7200RPM Hard Drive; 640 GB 7200RPM Hard Drive; 1000 GB 5400RPM Hard Drive; 128 GB [2x64 GB] SSD RAID 0; 256 GB [2x128 GB] SSD RAID 0; 512 GB [2x256 GB] SSD RAID 0 | 750GB 7200RPM Hard Drive; 1000 GB 5400RPM Hard Drive; 128 GB [2x64 GB] SSD RAID 0; 256 GB [2x128 GB] SSD RAID 0; 512 GB [2x256 GB] SSD RAID 0 |
| Optical Disc Drive | Internal DVD Burner | | | |
| Optical Disc Drive | Internal Blu-ray Disc Combo Drive (Reads Blu-ray and Burns DVD) | | | |
| Optical Disc Drive | Internal Blu-ray Disc Burner | | | |
| Internal Wireless Adapter | Intel Centrino Advanced-N 6200 IEEE 802.11a/b/g/n Internal Wi-Fi Adapter | Intel Centrino Advanced-N 6205 IEEE 802.11a/b/g/n Internal Wi-Fi Adapter | | |
| Peripheral Connections | SD card slot Memory Stick Duo Slot | | | |
| Peripheral Connections | 3x USB 2.0 | 2x USB 2.0, 1x USB 3.0 | 1x USB 2.0, 2x USB 3.0 | |
| Peripheral Connections | VGA (D-Sub) Out; HDMI Out | | | |
| Peripheral Connections | RJ-45 Gigabit Ethernet, 3.5mm Headphone/Audio Out, 3.5mm Microphone/Audio In | | | |
| Battery | 4800mAh Internal Lithium-Ion Battery | 4400mAh Internal Lithium-Ion Polymer Battery | | |
| Battery | —N/a | 4400mAh Lithium-Ion Polymer Removable Sheet Battery | | |
| Weight | 4.3 lbs (1.95 kg) | 3.6 lbs (1.63 kg) (SA) | 3.8 lbs (1.72 kg) (S13); 3.69 lbs (1.67 kg) (S13 Premium) | |
| Weight | —N/a | 4.4 lbs (2.0 kg) (SE, S15) | | |
| Dimensions | 13" Wide × 9" Deep × 1.2" Thick (33.02 cm × 22.86 cm × 3.05 cm) | 13.04" Wide × 8.84" Deep × 0.92" Thick (33.12 cm × 22.48 cm × 2.34 cm) (SA) | 13.04" Wide × 8.85" Deep × 0.95" Thick (33.12 cm × 22.48 cm × 2.41 cm) (S13) " × " × 0.90" (2.29 cm) Thick (S13 Premium) | |
| Dimensions | —N/a | 14.9" Wide × 10.1" Deep × 0.9" Thick (37.85 cm × 25.65 cm × 2.29 cm) (SE) | 14.97" (38 cm) Wide × 10.06" (25.55 cm) Deep × 0.95" (2.41 cm) Thick (38 cm × 25.55 cm × 2.41 cm) (S15) | |
| Model | Early 2010 | Early 2011 | Early 2012 | Late 2012 |
