= List of QI episodes =

Episodes of British panel show

QI (Quite Interesting) is a BBC comedy panel game television show that began in 2003. It was created by John Lloyd, and was hosted by Stephen Fry until the end of Series 13 [M] (13 years) after which Sandi Toksvig took over, and features permanent panellist Alan Davies. Each series covers topics that begin with a different letter of the alphabet; for example, the first series covered topics whose word began with "A". Thus it is referred to as "Series A" instead of "Series One".

QI was given a full series after BBC executives responded well to a nonbroadcast pilot and the first episode, "Adam", premiered on BBC Two on 11 September 2003. From the second to the fifth series, episodes aired each week on BBC Two; the second and subsequent episodes were shown first on BBC Four in the time-slot after the previous episode's BBC Two broadcast. When the sixth series of QI began in 2008, the show moved to BBC One and the broadcasting of episodes on BBC Four was replaced in favour of a 45-minute extended repeat broadcast on BBC Two the following day, titled QI XL. From the ninth series, QI returned to BBC Two on Friday at 10 pm with the XL edition on Saturdays. Lloyd acted as the producer for the first five series. Piers Fletcher became producer starting from Series F. Beginning with Series V of QI, the QI XL version aired before the standard QI on Tuesdays on BBC Two (starting from 22 October 2024). For the first half of the series, the standard edition aired on the following Sunday for the first 3 episodes, changing to the following Monday for the remaining 5.

Series X (QI's 24th) was filmed in early 2026, and broadcast on BBC Two from 3 November 2026.

As of 10 November 2026, 338 episodes of QI have aired. This count does not include the unbroadcast pilot, three special episodes, 34 compilation episodes (from "Series G" onwards), and one episode containing outtakes from "Series E".

== Series overview ==
Series	Episodes	Originally released	
Series	Episodes	First released	Last released
Pilot		Unaired	
A	12	11 September 2003	23 December 2003
B	12	8 October 2004	17 December 2004
C	12	30 September 2005	9 December 2005
D	13	29 September 2006	15 December 2006
E	13	21 September 2007	14 December 2007
F	12	14 November 2008	21 March 2009
G	18	26 November 2009	16 April 2010
H	18	17 September 2010	2 May 2011
Comic Relief		6 March 2011	
I	18	9 September 2011	19 May 2012
Sport Relief		23 March 2012	
J	18	14 September 2012	25 August 2013
K	18	6 September 2013	31 January 2014
L	18	3 October 2014	31 January 2015
M	18	16 October 2015	25 March 2016
N	18	21 October 2016	24 February 2017
O	18	20 October 2017	2 March 2018
P	18	10 September 2018	8 March 2019
Q	18	6 September 2019	28 February 2020
R	18	28 May 2020	4 February 2021
S	16	9 September 2021	22 February 2022
Comic Relief		18 March 2022	
T	16	11 November 2022	3 March 2023
U	17	18 December 2023	17 May 2024
V	16	22 October 2024	25 February 2025
W	16	21 October 2025	17 February 2026
X	16	3 November 2026	2027

== Episodes ==
Alan Davies, a panellist in every episode, is not listed as a guest.

=== Pilot ===
No. overall	No. in series	Title	Guests	Winner(s)	Original release date
N/A	N/A	"Pilot"	Bill Bailey; Kit Hesketh-Harvey; Eddie Izzard	Bill Bailey	N/A (Note: This episode was never broadcast, but was released as an extra on the Series A DVD.)

=== Series A (2003) ===
No. overall	No. in series	Title	Guests	Winner(s)	Original release date	Viewers (millions)
1	1	"Adam"	Danny Baker; Hugh Laurie; John Sessions	Danny Baker	11 September 2003	3.20
2	2	"Astronomy"	Bill Bailey; Rich Hall; Jeremy Hardy	Rich Hall and Jeremy Hardy	18 September 2003	2.16 (BBC2) + 0.20 (BBC4)
3	3	"Aquatic Animals"	Clive Anderson; Bill Bailey; Meera Syal	Clive Anderson	25 September 2003	2.46 (BBC2) + 0.18 (BBC4)
4	4	"Atoms"	Jo Brand; Howard Goodall; Jeremy Hardy	Jo Brand	2 October 2003	2.58 (BBC2) + 0.22 (BBC4)
5	5	"Advertising"	Gyles Brandreth; Rob Brydon; Rich Hall	Gyles Brandreth	9 October 2003	2.40 (BBC2) + 0.24 (BBC4)
6	6	"Antidotes"	Danny Baker; Jo Brand; Howard Goodall	Danny Baker	16 October 2003	2.51 (BBC2) + 0.27 (BBC4)
7	7	"Arthropods"	Jo Brand; Jimmy Carr; Jackie Clune	Jackie Clune	23 October 2003	<2.44 (BBC2) + 0.19 (BBC4)
8	8	"Albania"	Clive Anderson; Sean Lock; Linda Smith	Clive Anderson	30 October 2003	<2.60 (BBC2) + 0.24 (BBC4)
9	9	"Antelopes" (Note: Also known as "Africa".)	Jo Brand; Dave Gorman; Jeremy Hardy	Dave Gorman	6 November 2003	<2.30 (BBC2) + 0.33 (BBC4)
10	10	"Aviation"	Rich Hall; Julia Morris; Peter Serafinowicz	Alan Davies	13 November 2003	2.88 (BBC2) + 0.18 (BBC4)
11	11	"Arts"	Bill Bailey; Richard E. Grant; Linda Smith	Richard E. Grant	20 November 2003	<2.45 (BBC2) + 0.27 (BBC4)
12	12	"Advent" (Note: Christmas special)	Phill Jupitus; Sean Lock; John Sessions	John Sessions	23 December 2003	2.68 (BBC2) + 0.29 (BBC4)

=== Series B (2004) ===
No. overall	No. in series	Title	Guests	Winner(s)	Original release date	Viewers (millions)
13	1	"Blue"	Bill Bailey; Jo Brand; Sean Lock	Sean Lock	8 October 2004 (Note: Apart from the first episode which premiered on BBC Two, all the dates given are for when the episodes premiered on BBC Four.)	2.16
14	2	"Birds"	Jo Brand; Rich Hall; Phil Kay	Rich Hall	8 October 2004	2.45 (BBC2) + 0.25 (BBC4)
15	3	"Bombs"	Clive Anderson; Rich Hall; Phill Jupitus	Phill Jupitus	15 October 2004	2.69 (BBC2) + 0.18 (BBC4)
16	4	"Bible"	Jeremy Clarkson; Barry Cryer; Jeremy Hardy	Jeremy Clarkson	22 October 2004	2.72 (BBC2) + 0.25 (BBC4)
17	5	"Bears"	Bill Bailey; Jo Brand; Jimmy Carr	Jimmy Carr	29 October 2004	2.45 (BBC2) no data for BBC4
18	6	"Beavers"	Bill Bailey; Sean Lock; Anneka Rice	Anneka Rice	5 November 2004	2.61 (BBC2) + 0.36 (BBC4)
19	7	"Biscuits"	Rich Hall; Dara Ó Briain; Arthur Smith	Dara Ó Briain	12 November 2004	2.26 (BBC2) + 0.27 (BBC4)
20	8	"Bees"	Jo Brand; Rich Hall; Fred MacAulay	Rich Hall	19 November 2004	2.48 (BBC2) + 0.35 (BBC4)
21	9	"Bats"	Rich Hall; Josie Lawrence; John Sessions	Rich Hall and Josie Lawrence	26 November 2004	2.43 (BBC2) + 0.31 (BBC4)
22	10	"Bills"	Clive Anderson; Phil Kay; John Sessions	Clive Anderson	3 December 2004	2.35 (BBC2) + 0.31 (BBC4)
23	11	"Beats"	Mark Gatiss; Sean Lock; Linda Smith	Linda Smith	10 December 2004	2.33 (BBC2) + 0.31 (BBC4)
24	12	"Birth" (Note: For the General Ignorance portion of this episode, Fry and Davies switched places after Davies demanded that he "not be humiliated at Christmas". Fry deliberately collected enough forfeits to ensure he finished bottom.)	Rich Hall; Phill Jupitus; Mark Steel	Rich Hall	17 December 2004	<1.81 (BBC2) + 0.33 (BBC4)

=== Series C (2005) ===
No. overall	No. in series	Title	Guests	Winner(s)	Original release date	Viewers (millions)
25	1	"Campanology"	Bill Bailey; Rob Brydon; Rich Hall	Rich Hall	30 September 2005	2.33
26	2	"Cummingtonite"	Andy Hamilton; Doon Mackichan; Arthur Smith	Andy Hamilton	30 September 2005	2.61 (BBC2) + 0.52 (BBC4)
27	3	"Common Knowledge"	Jimmy Carr; Sean Lock; Rory McGrath	Rory McGrath	7 October 2005	2.59 (BBC2) + 0.34 (BBC4)
28	4	"Cheating"	Alexander Armstrong; Jeremy Clarkson; John Sessions	Alexander Armstrong	14 October 2005	2.41 (BBC2) + 0.44 (BBC4)
29	5	"Cat's Eyes"	Jo Brand; Rich Hall; Sean Lock	Sean Lock	21 October 2005	2.52 (BBC2) + 0.48 (BBC4)
30	6	"Cockneys"	Bill Bailey; Phill Jupitus; Rory McGrath	Bill Bailey	28 October 2005	2.57 (BBC2) + 0.37 (BBC4)
31	7	"Constellations"	Jeremy Clarkson; Rich Hall; Sean Lock	Jeremy Clarkson	4 November 2005	2.56 (BBC2) + 0.46 (BBC4)
32	8	"Corby"	Bill Bailey; Phill Jupitus; David Mitchell	David Mitchell	11 November 2005	2.27 (BBC2) + 0.56 (BBC4)
33	9	"Creatures"	Helen Atkinson-Wood; Bill Bailey; Andy Hamilton	Helen Atkinson-Wood	18 November 2005	2.83 (BBC2) + 0.47 (BBC4)
34	10	"Cleve Crudgington"	Clive Anderson; John Sessions; Mark Steel	Mark Steel	25 November 2005	<1.94 (BBC2) + 0.44 (BBC4)
35	11	"Carnival"	Clive Anderson; Jo Brand; Phill Jupitus	Clive Anderson	2 December 2005	2.34 (BBC2) + 0.38 (BBC4)
36	12	"Combustion"	Bill Bailey; Phill Jupitus; Dara Ó Briain	Bill Bailey	9 December 2005	2.24 (BBC2) + 0.36 (BBC4)

=== Series D (2006) ===
No. overall	No. in series	Title	Guests	Winner(s)	Original release date	Viewers (millions)
37	1	"Danger"	Jo Brand; Jimmy Carr; Sean Lock	Jo Brand	29 September 2006	2.42
38	2	"Discoveries"	Clive Anderson; Vic Reeves; Arthur Smith	Vic Reeves	29 September 2006	2.40 (BBC2) + 0.46 (BBC4)
39	3	"Dogs"	Jeremy Clarkson; Neil Mullarkey; Liza Tarbuck	Neil Mullarkey	6 October 2006	2.94 (BBC2) + 0.48 (BBC4)
40	4	"Dictionaries"	Ronni Ancona; Rory Bremner; Phill Jupitus	Ronni Ancona	13 October 2006	2.32 (BBC2) + 0.55 (BBC4)
41	5	"Death" (Note: Hallowe'en special)	Clive Anderson; Sean Lock; Andy Parsons	The Audience	20 October 2006	2.24 (BBC2) + 0.48 (BBC4)
42	6	"Drinks"	Jimmy Carr; Phill Jupitus; John Sessions	Alan Davies	27 October 2006	2.63 (BBC2) + 0.58 (BBC4)
43	7	"Differences"	Jo Brand; Julian Clary; Dara Ó Briain	Dara Ó Briain	3 November 2006	2.63 (BBC2) + 0.60 (BBC4)
44	8	"Descendants" (Note: Children in Need special)	Rich Hall; Phill Jupitus; Jonathan Ross	Jonathan Ross	10 November 2006	3.43 (BBC2) + 0.68 (BBC4)
45	9	"Doves"	Andy Hamilton; David Mitchell; John Sessions	Alan Davies	17 November 2006	2.52 (BBC2) + 0.67 (BBC4)
46	10	"Divination" (Note: Alan Davies was absent for the recording of this episode, as he did not want to miss his favourite football team, Arsenal, playing in the Champions League final that same evening. He did however make an appearance through pre-recorded material, which ended with him being 'teleported' to the match as he tested his buzzer.)	Graeme Garden; Phill Jupitus; Johnny Vaughan	Graeme Garden	24 November 2006	2.10 (BBC2) + 0.58 (BBC4)
47	11	"Deprivation"	Roger McGough; Vic Reeves; Mark Steel	Roger McGough and Vic Reeves	1 December 2006	2.54 (BBC2) + 0.46 (BBC4)
48	12	"Domesticity"	Jo Brand; Phill Jupitus; Jessica Stevenson	Jessica Stevenson	8 December 2006	2.32 (BBC2) + 0.60 (BBC4)
49	13	"December"	Jo Brand; Rich Hall; Dara Ó Briain	Dara Ó Briain	15 December 2006	2.86 (BBC2) + 0.56 (BBC4)

=== Series E (2007) ===
No. overall	No. in series	Title	Guests	Winner(s)	Original release date	Viewers (millions)
50	1	"Engineering"	Bill Bailey; Rob Brydon; Jimmy Carr	Rob Brydon	21 September 2007	2.81
51	2	"Electricity"	Jo Brand; Rich Hall; Sean Lock	Jo Brand	21 September 2007	2.82 (BBC2) + 0.60 (BBC4)
52	3	"Eating"	Jimmy Carr; Phill Jupitus; Johnny Vegas	Alan Davies	28 September 2007	2.94 (BBC2) + 0.66 (BBC4)
53	4	"Exploration"	Bill Bailey; Rich Hall; Sean Lock	Rich Hall	5 October 2007	2.96 (BBC2) + 0.68 (BBC4)
54	5	"Europe"	Phill Jupitus; David Mitchell; Dara Ó Briain	Phill Jupitus	12 October 2007	3.19 (BBC2) + 0.70 (BBC4)
55	6	"Everything, Etc."	Clive Anderson; Jeremy Clarkson; Vic Reeves	Vic Reeves	19 October 2007	3.10 (BBC2) + 0.56 (BBC4)
56	7	"Espionage"	Clive Anderson; Jo Brand; Vic Reeves	Clive Anderson and Vic Reeves	26 October 2007	2.53 (BBC2) + 0.61 (BBC4)
57	8	"Eyes and Ears"	Jimmy Carr; Phill Jupitus; David Mitchell	Alan Davies	2 November 2007	2.83 (BBC2) + 0.56 (BBC4)
58	9	"Entertainment"	Bill Bailey; Jo Brand; Jeremy Clarkson	Jeremy Clarkson	9 November 2007	4.75 (BBC2) + 0.74 (BBC4)
59	10	"England"	Charlie Higson; Phill Jupitus; Sean Lock	The Audience	16 November 2007	2.75 (BBC2) + 0.63 (BBC4)
60	11	"Endings"	Jimmy Carr; Doon Mackichan; Dara Ó Briain	Jimmy Carr and Dara Ó Briain	23 November 2007	2.63 (BBC2) + 0.77 (BBC4)
61	12	"Empire"	Bill Bailey; Jo Brand; Sean Lock	Alan Davies	7 December 2007	2.59 (BBC2) + 0.64 (BBC4)
N/A	13	"Elephants" (Note: A special episode containing outtakes from Series E.)	N/A	N/A	14 December 2007	3.02 (BBC2) + 0.61 (BBC4)

=== Series F (2008–09) ===
Beginning with "Fire and Freezing", episodes premiered on BBC One. XL editions were broadcast the following day on BBC Two, from "Flotsam and Jetsam" onwards.

No. overall	No. in series	Title	Guests	Winner(s)	Original release date	Viewers (millions) (Note: Ratings for half-hour version only.)
62	1	"Families"	Ronni Ancona; David Mitchell; Sir Terry Wogan	Ronni Ancona	14 November 2008	4.61
63	2	"Fire and Freezing"	Clive Anderson; Rob Brydon; Dom Joly	Clive Anderson	22 December 2008	N/A (<5.16) (Note: Not reported in the weekly top 30 programmes.)
64	3	"Flotsam and Jetsam"	Rob Brydon; Andy Hamilton; Charlie Higson	Charlie Higson	9 January 2009; 10 January 2009 (XL edition)	4.75
65	4	"Fight or Flight"	Pam Ayres; Sean Lock; Johnny Vegas	Pam Ayres	16 January 2009; 17 January 2009 (XL edition)	N/A (<4.84)
66	5	"France"	Jo Brand; Hugh Dennis; Phill Jupitus	Hugh Dennis	23 January 2009; 24 January 2009 (XL edition)	N/A (<4.65)
67	6	"Fakes and Frauds"	Marcus Brigstocke; Jimmy Carr; Sean Lock	Sean Lock	30 January 2009; 31 January 2009 (XL edition)	N/A (<4.78)
68	7	"Fingers and Fumbs"	Jo Brand; Phill Jupitus; Dara Ó Briain	Phill Jupitus	6 February 2009; 7 February 2009 (XL edition)	N/A (<5.16)
69	8	"Fashion"	Clive Anderson; Rich Hall; Reginald D. Hunter	Rich Hall	13 February 2009; 14 February 2009 (XL edition)	N/A (<4.62)
70	9	"The Future"	Rob Brydon; Sean Lock; Ben Miller	Ben Miller	20 February 2009; 21 February 2009 (XL edition)	N/A (<4.58)
71	10	"Flora and Fauna"	Jo Brand; Jimmy Carr; John Sergeant	The Audience	27 February 2009; 28 February 2009 (XL edition)	N/A (<4.83)
72	11	"Film"	David Mitchell; John Sessions; Emma Thompson	Alan Davies	6 March 2009; 7 March 2009 (XL edition)	4.90
73	12	"Food"	Jimmy Carr; Rich Hall; David Mitchell	David Mitchell	20 March 2009 (Note: The broadcast of this episode was delayed by a week because of the 2009 Comic Relief telethon.); 21 March 2009 (XL edition)	4.90

=== Series G (2009–10) ===
No. overall	No. in series	Title	Guests	Winner(s)	Original release date	Viewers (millions)
74	1	"Gardens"	Rob Brydon; David Mitchell; Dara Ó Briain	David Mitchell and Dara Ó Briain	26 November 2009; 20 March 2010 (XL edition) (Note: The first few XLs were not screened the day after the short version was shown in Series G, the BBC instead choosing to hold them back for later airing dates.)	4.98
75	2	"G-Animals"	Bill Bailey; John Hodgman (Note: Hodgman was a last-minute addition to the panel after the producers found out he was in the UK. This is the only episode to feature five panellists on the show instead of four.); Sean Lock; Sandi Toksvig	John Hodgman	3 December 2009; 12 October 2010 (XL edition) (Note: The XL version of this episode premiered on Dave, not the BBC.)	N/A (<4.20)
76	3	"Games"	Phill Jupitus; Sean Lock; Liza Tarbuck	Liza Tarbuck	10 December 2009; 19 October 2010 (XL edition)	4.86
77	4	"Geography"	Jo Brand; Rob Brydon; Jimmy Carr	Alan Davies	17 December 2009; 23 December 2009 (XL edition)	5.04
78	5	"Groovy"	Bill Bailey; Lee Mack; David Tennant	Alan Davies	24 December 2009; 29 December 2009 (XL edition)	6.16
79	6	"Genius"	David Mitchell; Graham Norton; Dara Ó Briain	Alan Davies	1 January 2010; 2 January 2010 (XL edition)	5.23
80	7	"Girls and Boys"	Ronni Ancona; Jack Dee; Sandi Toksvig	The Girls (Note: For the first time, the players were divided into teams, with the men on one team and the women on the other.)	8 January 2010; 9 January 2010 (XL edition)	N/A (<5.77)
81	8	"Germany"	Jo Brand; Rob Brydon; Sean Lock	Jo Brand	15 January 2010; 16 January 2010 (XL edition)	5.33
82	9	"Gallimaufrey"	Hugh Dennis; Andy Hamilton; Phill Jupitus	Hugh Dennis	22 January 2010; 23 January 2010 (XL edition)	N/A (<4.75)
83	10	"Greats"	Jo Brand; Sean Lock; David Mitchell	David Mitchell (Note: Jo Brand was listed as finishing 5th in this episode – US President Barack Obama 'finished' 4th with a score of −10 for referring to 44 different Presidents taking the oath of office in a clip of his inauguration speech, activating a klaxon. At the time, there were actually 43, because Grover Cleveland was the 22nd and 24th President.)	29 January 2010; 30 January 2010 (XL edition)	4.70
84	11	"Gifts"	Clive Anderson; Jimmy Carr; Jan Ravens	Jan Ravens	5 February 2010; 6 February 2010 (XL edition)	4.67
85	12	"Gravity"	Bill Bailey; Rich Hall; Barry Humphries	Alan Davies and Rich Hall	12 February 2010; 13 February 2010 (XL edition)	4.54
86	13	"Gothic"	Jimmy Carr; Jack Dee; Sue Perkins	Alan Davies and Jack Dee	19 February 2010; 20 February 2010 (XL edition)	N/A (<4.32)
87	14	"Greeks"	Clive Anderson; Rich Hall; Phill Jupitus	Clive Anderson (QI) / The Audience (QI XL) (Note: On the original transmission, Clive Anderson was announced as the winner, but in the XL version it was shown that the actual winner was the audience, scoring 10 points compared to Anderson's 3 points.)	5 March 2010; 6 March 2010 (XL edition)	N/A (<4.68)
88	15	"Green"	Bill Bailey; Danny Baker; Jeremy Clarkson	Bill Bailey	26 March 2010; 22 February 2011 (XL edition)	N/A (<4.27)
89	16	"Geometry"	Rob Brydon; David Mitchell; Johnny Vegas	Alan Davies	2 April 2010; 22 February 2011 (XL edition)	N/A (<4.33)
N/A	17	"QI VG: Series G Compilation Show 1"	N/A	N/A	5 April 2010	N/A (<4.14)
N/A	18	"QI VG: Series G Compilation Show 2"	N/A	N/A	16 April 2010	N/A (<4.06)

=== Series H (2010–11) ===
No. overall	No. in series	Title	Guests	Winner(s)	Original release date	Viewers (millions)
90	1	"Hodge Podge"	Jack Dee; Phill Jupitus; Ross Noble	Jack Dee	17 September 2010; 18 September 2010 (XL edition)	4.51
91	2	"H Anatomy"	Bill Bailey; Gyles Brandreth; Sue Perkins	Gyles Brandreth and Sue Perkins	24 September 2010; 25 September 2010 (XL edition)	N/A (<4.03)
92	3	"Hoaxes"	Danny Baker; Sean Lock; David Mitchell	Sean Lock	1 October 2010; 2 October 2010 (XL edition)	4.90
93	4	"Humans"	Jo Brand; Jimmy Carr; Jack Dee	Jo Brand	8 October 2010; 9 October 2010 (XL edition)	N/A (<4.14)
94	5	"H Animals"	Sean Lock; Ross Noble; Ruby Wax	Ross Noble	15 October 2010; 16 October 2010 (XL edition)	N/A (<4.33)
95	6	"Happiness"	Rich Hall; Andy Hamilton; Phill Jupitus	Phill Jupitus	22 October 2010; 23 October 2010 (XL edition)	N/A (<4.38)
96	7	"Horrible"	Chris Addison; Sean Lock; Dara Ó Briain	Dara Ó Briain	29 October 2010; 20 November 2010 (XL edition)	N/A (<4.37)
97	8	"Hypothetical"	John Lloyd; Sandi Toksvig; Johnny Vegas	Sandi Toksvig	5 November 2010; 22 January 2011 (XL edition)	N/A (<4.52)
98	9	"House and Home"	Bill Bailey; Danny Baker; Eddie Izzard	Bill Bailey	12 November 2010; 29 January 2011 (XL edition)	4.76
99	10	"Health and Safety"	Jeremy Clarkson; David Mitchell; Ross Noble	David Mitchell	26 November 2010; 27 November 2010 (XL edition)	N/A (<4.44)
100	11	"Highs and Lows"	Rob Brydon; Fred MacAulay; Sandi Toksvig	Fred MacAulay	3 December 2010; 4 December 2010 (XL edition)	5.02
101	12	"Horses & Hunting"	Clare Balding; Jimmy Carr; Dara Ó Briain	Clare Balding	10 December 2010; 11 December 2010 (XL edition)	N/A (<4.31)
102	13	"Holidays"	Bill Bailey; Rob Brydon; Rich Hall	Rob Brydon	17 December 2010; 18 December 2010 (XL edition)	N/A (<4.89)
103	14	"Hocus Pocus"	Lee Mack; Graham Norton; Daniel Radcliffe	Daniel Radcliffe	24 December 2010; 29 December 2010 (XL edition)	6.46
104	15	"Hypnosis, Hallucinations & Hysteria"	Ronni Ancona; Phill Jupitus; Robert Webb	Phill Jupitus	7 January 2011; 8 January 2011 (XL edition)	N/A (<5.08)
105	16	"History"	Rob Brydon; David Mitchell; Sandi Toksvig	Rob Brydon	14 January 2011; 15 January 2011 (XL edition)	N/A (<4.85)
N/A	17	"QI VG: Series H Compilation Show 1"	N/A	N/A	25 April 2011	N/A (<4.07)
N/A	18	"QI VG: Series H Compilation Show 2"	N/A	N/A	2 May 2011	N/A (<4.11)

=== Comic Relief Special (2011) ===
No. overall	No. in series	Title	Guests	Winner(s)	Original release date
N/A	N/A	"Comic Relief special" (Note: Special episode webcast live as part of 24 Hour Panel People. Alan Davies was not present for this episode.)	Jo Brand; Sue Perkins; Russell Tovey; David Walliams	David Walliams	6 March 2011

=== Series I (2011–12) ===
No. overall	No. in series	Title	Guests	Winner(s)	Original release date	Viewers (millions) (Note: Ratings for half-hour version only unless otherwise specified.)
106	1	"I-Spy"	Jimmy Carr; Lee Mack; Sandi Toksvig	Sandi Toksvig	9 September 2011; 10 September 2011 (XL edition)	3.45
107	2	"International"	Bill Bailey; Jack Dee; David Mitchell	Bill Bailey	16 September 2011; 17 September 2011 (XL edition)	2.98
108	3	"Imbroglio"	John Bishop; Sean Lock; Frank Skinner	John Bishop and Frank Skinner	23 September 2011; 24 September 2011 (XL edition)	3.40
109	4	"Indecision"	Jimmy Carr; Rich Hall; Phill Jupitus	Phill Jupitus	30 September 2011; 1 October 2011 (XL edition)	2.70
110	5	"Invertebrates"	Jimmy Carr; Sarah Millican; Johnny Vegas	Johnny Vegas	7 October 2011; 8 October 2011 (XL edition)	3.01
111	6	"Inventive"	Bill Bailey; Nina Conti (Note: Conti was accompanied by her ventriloquist's puppet, Gran, whose score was counted separately from her own.); Sean Lock	Nina Conti	14 October 2011; 15 October 2011 (XL edition)	2.91
112	7	"Incomprehensible"	Prof. Brian Cox; Ross Noble; Sue Perkins	Prof. Brian Cox	21 October 2011; 22 October 2011 (XL edition)	2.90
113	8	"Inequality"	Clive Anderson; Sandi Toksvig; Henning Wehn	Not stated (Note: As part of the theme, the scores were unjustly given at the beginning, stating that Toksvig won (despite the fact Anderson had a higher score). The true scores were not revealed at the end.)	28 October 2011; 29 October 2011 (XL edition)	2.66
114	9	"Illness"	Jo Brand; Ben Goldacre; Andy Hamilton	Andy Hamilton	4 November 2011; 5 November 2011 (XL edition)	2.97
115	10	"Inland Revenue"	Al Murray; Dara Ó Briain; Sandi Toksvig	Sandi Toksvig	11 November 2011; 12 November 2011 (XL edition)	2.77
116	11	"Infantile"	Ronni Ancona; Dave Gorman; Lee Mack	Dave Gorman	29 December 2011 (Note: The original broadcast of the 30-minute edition of this episode was replaced by live coverage of Children in Need on BBC Two. It was eventually shown at 11:30pm on the day of the first broadcast of "Ice".); 19 November 2011 (XL edition)	<1.73; 2.14 (XL)
117	12	"Illumination"	Chris Addison; Jack Dee; Rich Hall	Rich Hall	25 November 2011; 26 November 2011 (XL edition)	2.49
118	13	"Intelligence"	Jo Brand; Phill Jupitus; David Mitchell	ASIMO (Note: ASIMO scored points by demonstrating its technological capabilities to the audience. Of the four panellists, Mitchell had the highest score.)	2 December 2011; 3 December 2011 (XL edition)	2.12
N/A	14	"QI VG: Series I Compilation Show 1"	N/A	N/A	16 December 2011	2.07
N/A	15	"QI VG: Series I Compilation Show 2"	N/A	N/A	23 December 2011	2.29
119	16	"Ice"	Brian Blessed; Sean Lock; Ross Noble	Alan Davies	29 December 2011; 30 December 2011 (XL edition)	2.36
120	17	"The Immortal Bard" (Note: Special episode aired as part of BBC Two's Shakespeare season.)	Bill Bailey; David Mitchell; Sue Perkins	David Mitchell	27 April 2012; 19 May 2012 (XL edition)	2.92
121	18	"Idleness"	Jeremy Clarkson; Ross Noble; Dara Ó Briain	Alan Davies	4 May 2012 (Note: This episode was originally scheduled to go out on 9 December 2011 (as episode 14 of the series), but after a furore over comments that panellist Jeremy Clarkson had made live on The One Show – concerning a recent public sector strike and suicides on railway lines – the BBC decided to postpone the airing until a later date. The episode went to air in Australia before it was screened in the UK, and it was briefly available on BBC iPlayer on 5 May 2012 but quickly removed.); 24 May 2012 (XL edition) (Note: This XL edition was unintentionally made available on the BBC iPlayer following the date of its original intended broadcast (it was removed the following morning). The first TV broadcast was on BBC HD.)	2.68

=== Sport Relief Special (2012) ===
No. overall	No. in series	Title	Guests	Winner(s)	Original release date
N/A	N/A	"Sport Relief special" (Note: A short sports-themed edition of the show, recorded during the filming of the "I-Spy" episode and broadcast during the 2012 Sport Relief telethon.)	Jimmy Carr; Lee Mack; Sandi Toksvig	Everyone (Note: The scores were not revealed.)	23 March 2012

=== Series J (2012–13) ===
No. overall	No. in series	Title	Guests	Winner(s)	Original release date	Viewers (millions)
122	1	"Jargon"	Bill Bailey; Jimmy Carr; Victoria Coren	Victoria Coren	14 September 2012; 15 September 2012 (XL edition)	2.32
123	2	"Jam, Jelly and Juice"	Jo Brand; Sue Perkins; Liza Tarbuck	Alan Davies	21 September 2012; 22 September 2012 (XL edition)	2.31
124	3	"Journeys"	Rob Brydon; Phill Jupitus; Cal Wilson	Alan Davies	28 September 2012; 29 September 2012 (XL edition)	2.23
125	4	"Jack and Jill"	Katy Brand; David Mitchell; Sue Perkins	David Mitchell	5 October 2012; 6 October 2012 (XL edition)	1.89
126	5	"J-Places"	Bill Bailey; Susan Calman; Sandi Toksvig	Susan Calman	12 October 2012; 13 October 2012 (XL edition)	2.29
127	6	"Joints"	Jimmy Carr; Jack Whitehall; Cal Wilson	Cal Wilson	19 October 2012; 20 October 2012 (XL edition)	2.31
128	7	"Journalism"	Shappi Khorsandi; Ross Noble; Johnny Vegas	Ross Noble	26 October 2012; 27 October 2012 (XL edition)	2.21
129	8	"Jumble"	Jo Brand; Dara Ó Briain; John Sessions	Stephen Fry (Note: Fry declared himself the winner having awarded himself 52! (52-factorial, approximately 8×10^{67}) points for demonstrating that no two shuffles of a deck of cards would ever be the same. Of the four panellists, Sessions had the highest score.)	2 November 2012; 3 November 2012 (XL edition)	2.47
130	9	"Jeopardy"	Ross Noble; Sue Perkins; Julia Zemiro	Sue Perkins	9 November 2012; 10 November 2012 (XL edition)	2.69
131	10	"Jungles"	Reginald D. Hunter; David O'Doherty; Greg Proops	Reginald D. Hunter	23 November 2012; 24 November 2012 (XL edition)	2.22
132	11	"Jumpers"	Bill Bailey; Julian Clary; Ross Noble	Bill Bailey	30 November 2012; 1 December 2012 (XL edition)	1.99
133	12	"Justice"	Prof. Brian Cox; Rhys Darby; Jason Manford	Alan Davies	7 December 2012; 8 December 2012 (XL edition)	2.04
134	13	"Jobs"	The Rev. Richard Coles; Sarah Millican; David Mitchell	The Rev. Richard Coles	14 December 2012; 16 December 2012 (XL edition)	2.29
135	14	"Jingle Bells"	Danny Baker; Phill Jupitus; Sarah Millican	Danny Baker	21 December 2012; 29 December 2012 (XL edition)	2.51
N/A	15	"QI VG: Series J Compilation Show 1"	N/A	N/A	28 December 2012	1.56
N/A	16	"QI VG: Series J Compilation Show 2"	N/A	N/A	4 January 2013	1.71
136	17	"Jolly"	Rob Brydon; Tim Vine; Julia Zemiro	Alan Davies	11 January 2013; 12 January 2013 (XL edition)	2.62
137	18	"Just the Job"	Jeremy Clarkson; Jason Manford; Sandi Toksvig	Sandi Toksvig	25 August 2013; 31 August 2013 (XL edition); 24 July 2013 (in Australia)	1.78

=== Series K (2013–14) ===
No. overall	No. in series	Title	Guests	Winner(s)	Original release date	Viewers (millions)
138	1	"Knees and Knockers"	David Mitchell; Sara Pascoe; Jack Whitehall	Sara Pascoe	6 September 2013; 8 September 2013 (XL edition)	2.70
139	2	"Kit and Kaboodle"	Noel Fielding; Colin Lane; Ross Noble	Ross Noble	13 September 2013; 15 September 2013 (XL edition)	2.18
140	3	"K-Folk"	Phill Jupitus; Katherine Ryan; Josh Widdicombe	Alan Davies	20 September 2013; 22 September 2013 (XL edition)	2.46
141	4	"Knits & Knots"	David Mitchell; Ross Noble; Sue Perkins	David Mitchell	27 September 2013; 29 September 2013 (XL edition)	2.48
142	5	"Kings"	Bill Bailey; Jimmy Carr; Jeremy Clarkson	The Audience	4 October 2013; 6 October 2013 (XL edition)	2.34
143	6	"Killers"	Jason Manford; Trevor Noah; Sandi Toksvig	Sandi Toksvig	11 October 2013; 13 October 2013 (XL edition)	2.24
144	7	"Knowledge"	Jo Brand; Jimmy Carr; Graham Linehan	Alan Davies (Note: To match with the theme of correcting previous inaccuracies, the panellists were given points that they would be owed for their prior appearances' incorrect answers which were statistically now correct. Davies received 737.66 owed points, several hundred more than anyone else was owed, ensuring that he won. The panellist who had the most points without including this bonus was Jo Brand.)	18 October 2013; 20 October 2013 (XL edition)	2.49
145	8	"Keys"	Bill Bailey; Tim Minchin; Isy Suttie	Bill Bailey	25 October 2013; 27 October 2013 (XL edition)	2.36
146	9	"Kinetic"	Danny Baker; Jo Brand; Marcus Brigstocke	Danny Baker	1 November 2013; 3 November 2013 (XL edition)	2.26
147	10	"Keeps"	Bill Bailey; Jason Manford; Sarah Millican	Bill Bailey	8 November 2013; 23 December 2013 (XL edition)	2.21
148	11	"Kinky"	Janet Street-Porter; Sandi Toksvig; Johnny Vegas	Sandi Toksvig	29 November 2013; 30 November 2013 (XL edition)	2.06
149	12	"Knights and Knaves"	The Rev. Richard Coles; Victoria Coren Mitchell; Sue Perkins	The Rev. Richard Coles and Victoria Coren Mitchell	6 December 2013; 7 December 2013 (XL edition)	2.00
150	13	"Kitchen Sink"	Jason Manford; Richard Osman; Victoria Wood	Alan Davies	13 December 2013; 15 December 2013 (XL edition)	2.55
151	14	"Kris Kringle"	Jo Brand; Phill Jupitus; Brendan O'Carroll	Phill Jupitus	24 December 2013 (XL edition); 29 December 2013 (Note: The XL edition of this episode was broadcast before the regular edition.)	2.42 (XL); 1.79
152	15	"Kitsch"	Jimmy Carr; Reginald D. Hunter; Sue Perkins	Jimmy Carr	10 January 2014; 11 January 2014 (XL edition)	2.34
153	16	"Kaleidoscope"	Susan Calman; Liza Tarbuck; Sandi Toksvig	Sandi Toksvig	17 January 2014; 18 January 2014 (XL edition)	2.23
N/A	17	"QI VG: Series K Compilation Show 1"	N/A	N/A	24 January 2014	2.16
N/A	18	"QI VG: Series K Compilation Show 2"	N/A	N/A	31 January 2014	1.57

=== Series L (2014–15) ===
No. overall	No. in series	Title	Guests	Winner(s)	Original release date	Viewers (millions) (Note: From episode 11 onwards, ratings are 28-day consolidated. Beforehand, 7-day consolidated.)
154	1	"L-Animals"	Colin Lane; Sarah Millican; Ross Noble	Ross Noble	3 October 2014; 5 October 2014 (XL edition)	2.32
155	2	"Location, Location, Location"	Aisling Bea; Jason Manford; Johnny Vegas	Jason Manford	10 October 2014; 11 October 2014 (XL edition)	2.23
156	3	"Literature"	Victoria Coren Mitchell; Lloyd Langford; Jack Whitehall	Victoria Coren Mitchell	17 October 2014; 18 October 2014 (XL edition)	2.15
157	4	"Levity"	Sue Perkins; Frank Skinner; Josh Widdicombe	Alan Davies	24 October 2014; 25 October 2014 (XL edition)	1.89
158	5	"Lenses"	Jo Brand; Phill Jupitus; Josh Widdicombe	Phill Jupitus	31 October 2014; 1 November 2014 (XL edition)	2.10
159	6	"Liblabble"	Bill Bailey; The Rev. Richard Coles; Sara Pascoe	Alan Davies	7 November 2014; 8 November 2014 (XL edition)	2.07
160	7	"Lethal"	Bill Bailey; Jason Manford; Sandi Toksvig	Sandi Toksvig	21 November 2014; 22 November 2014 (XL edition)	1.56
161	8	"Lovely"	Aisling Bea; Tony Hawks; Josh Widdicombe	Tony Hawks	28 November 2014; 29 November 2014 (XL edition)	1.67
162	9	"Ladies and Gents"	Kathy Lette; Ross Noble; Sue Perkins	Ross Noble	5 December 2014; 7 February 2015 (XL edition)	1.98
163	10	"Lying"	Adam Hills; Sara Pascoe; Jack Whitehall	Adam Hills	12 December 2014; 13 December 2014 (XL edition)	1.91
164	11	"Lumped Together"	Ronni Ancona; Jimmy Carr; David Mitchell	Alan Davies	19 December 2014; 21 December 2014 (XL edition)	1.42
165	12	"No-L"	Bill Bailey; Jimmy Carr; Carrie Fisher	Jimmy Carr	25 December 2014; 27 December 2014 (XL edition)	N/A (<1.46)
166	13	"Lucky Losers"	Danny Baker; Jeremy Clarkson; Sandi Toksvig	Danny Baker (Note: As part of the theme, the scoring system was inverted, with the panellist with the lowest score being declared the winner and the highest scorer the loser.)	2 January 2015; 4 January 2015 (XL edition)	1.71
167	14	"Little and Large"	Phill Jupitus; Richard Osman; Lucy Porter	Lucy Porter	9 January 2015; 11 January 2015 (XL edition)	1.92
168	15	"Long Lost"	Jimmy Carr; Claudia O'Doherty; Suggs	Claudia O'Doherty	16 January 2015; 4 April 2015 (XL edition)	2.07
169	16	"Landmarks"	Jo Brand; Colin Lane; David Mitchell	Colin Lane	23 January 2015; 18 April 2015 (XL edition)	1.93
N/A	17	"QI VG: Series L Compilation Show 1"	N/A	N/A	30 January 2015	1.36
N/A	18	"QI VG: Series L Compilation Show 2"	N/A	N/A	31 January 2015	N/A (<1.29)

=== Series M (2015–16) ===
No. overall	No. in series	Title	Guests	Winner(s)	Original release date	Viewers (millions)
170	1	"A Medley of Maladies"	Matt Lucas; Ross Noble; Lucy Porter	Lucy Porter	16 October 2015; 17 October 2015 (XL edition)	1.78
171	2	"Military Matters"	Jimmy Carr; Jeremy Clarkson; Sheila Hancock	Sheila Hancock	23 October 2015; 24 October 2015 (XL edition)	1.69
172	3	"M-Places"	David Mitchell; Sue Perkins; Sami Shah	David Mitchell	30 October 2015; 14 November 2015 (XL edition)	1.88
173	4	"Miscellany"	Noel Fielding; Rhod Gilbert; Cariad Lloyd	Cariad Lloyd	6 November 2015; 7 November 2015 (XL edition)	2.08
174	5	"Maths"	Aisling Bea; Susan Calman; Sandi Toksvig	Aisling Bea	20 November 2015; 21 November 2015 (XL edition)	1.60
175	6	"Marriage and Mating"	Bill Bailey; Jo Brand; Greg Davies	Jo Brand	27 November 2015; 28 November 2015 (XL edition)	1.62
176	7	"Middle Muddle"	Aisling Bea; Danny Bhoy; Jimmy Carr	Danny Bhoy	11 December 2015; 12 December 2015 (XL edition)	1.60
177	8	"Merriment"	Bill Bailey; Jenny Eclair; Johnny Vegas	Alan Davies	19 December 2015 (XL edition); 25 December 2015	1.82
178	9	"Messing with Your Mind"	Sarah Millican; Tommy Tiernan; Josh Widdicombe	Tommy Tiernan	29 December 2015; 2 January 2016 (XL edition)	1.82
179	10	"Making a Meal of It"	Phill Jupitus; Cariad Lloyd; Dermot O'Leary	Phill Jupitus	8 January 2016; 9 January 2016 (XL edition)	1.71
180	11	"Menagerie"	Bill Bailey; Sue Perkins; Romesh Ranganathan	Bill Bailey	15 January 2016; 16 January 2016 (XL edition)	1.79
181	12	"Medieval Macabre"	Matt Lucas; David Mitchell; Julia Zemiro	Matt Lucas and Julia Zemiro	22 January 2016; 23 January 2016 (XL edition)	1.83
182	13	"Monster Mash"	Phill Jupitus; Sara Pascoe; Josh Widdicombe	Phill Jupitus	29 January 2016; 22 February 2016 (XL edition)	1.44
183	14	"Messy"	Noel Fielding; Eddie Kadi; Sarah Millican	Alan Davies	5 February 2016; 29 February 2016 (XL edition)	1.54
184	15	"Mix and Match"	James Acaster; Bill Bailey; Jo Brand	Jo Brand	12 February 2016; 4 April 2016 (XL edition)	1.61
185	16	"Misconceptions"	Chris Addison; Sara Cox; Sue Perkins	Chris Addison	19 February 2016; 28 March 2016 (XL edition)	1.41
N/A	17	"QI VG: Series M Compilation Show 1"	N/A	N/A	4 March 2016	1.20
N/A	18	"QI VG: Series M Compilation Show 2"	N/A	N/A	25 March 2016	1.12

=== Series N (2016–17) ===
No. overall	No. in series	Title	Guests	Winner(s)	Original release date	Viewers (millions)
186	1	"Naming Names"	Phill Jupitus; Cariad Lloyd; Romesh Ranganathan	Alan Davies	21 October 2016; 23 October 2016 (XL edition)	2.35
187	2	"North Norse"	Lucy Beaumont; Rhod Gilbert; Jason Manford	Alan Davies	28 October 2016; 30 October 2016 (XL edition)	1.65
188	3	"Nosey Noisy"	Aisling Bea; Ross Noble; Corey Taylor	Alan Davies	4 November 2016; 6 November 2016 (XL edition)	1.95
189	4	"Noble Rot"	Jeremy Clarkson; Jason Manford; Sara Pascoe	Jason Manford	11 November 2016; 20 November 2016 (XL edition)	1.82
190	5	"Not Nearly"	Gyles Brandreth; Jimmy Carr; Victoria Coren Mitchell	Gyles Brandreth	25 November 2016; 27 November 2016 (XL edition)	1.61
191	6	"Night"	Noel Fielding; David Mitchell; Holly Walsh	Holly Walsh	2 December 2016; 4 December 2016 (XL edition)	1.85
192	7	"Naked Truth"	Lolly Adefope; Lee Mack; Richard Osman	Richard Osman	9 December 2016; 11 December 2016 (XL edition)	1.79
193	8	"Non Sequiturs"	Phill Jupitus; Miles Jupp; Deirdre O'Kane	Miles Jupp	16 December 2016; 17 December 2016 (XL edition)	1.72
194	9	"Noel"	Susan Calman; Matt Lucas; Josh Widdicombe	All	22 December 2016; 25 December 2016 (XL edition)	1.93
195	10	"Nature/Nurture"	David Baddiel; Cariad Lloyd; Ross Noble	Ross Noble	30 December 2016; 2 January 2017 (XL edition)	2.27
196	11	"Nonsense"	Phill Jupitus; Nish Kumar; Holly Walsh	Phill Jupitus and Nish Kumar	6 January 2017; 8 January 2017 (XL edition)	2.01
197	12	"Noodles"	Cariad Lloyd; Matt Lucas; Jerry Springer	Cariad Lloyd	13 January 2017; 15 January 2017 (XL edition)	1.94
198	13	"Naval Navigation"	Ronni Ancona; Jimmy Carr; Johnny Vegas	Ronni Ancona	20 January 2017; 22 January 2017 (XL edition)	1.94
199	14	"Numbers"	Noel Fielding; Colin Lane; Sarah Millican	Sarah Millican (Note: Although Millican had fewer points than both Lane, and Fielding, she was declared the winner as Toksvig once had to stand her up so she could become the host of QI.)	27 January 2017; 29 January 2017 (XL edition)	1.81
200	15	"Next"	Frankie Boyle; Ross Noble; Lucy Porter	Ross Noble	3 February 2017; 4 February 2017 (XL edition)	1.66
201	16	"New"	Clive Anderson; Jo Brand; Jimmy Carr	Jimmy Carr	10 February 2017; 11 February 2017 (XL edition)	1.59
N/A	17	"QI VG: Series N Compilation Show 1"	N/A	N/A	17 February 2017	1.72
N/A	18	"QI VG: Series N Compilation Show 2"	N/A	N/A	24 February 2017	1.59

=== Series O (2017–18) ===
No. overall	No. in series	Title	Guests	Winner(s)	Original release date	Viewers (millions)
202	1	"Ologies"	Bill Bailey; Phill Jupitus; Claudia Winkleman	Claudia Winkleman	20 October 2017; 21 October 2017 (XL edition)	1.93
203	2	"Organisms"	Nish Kumar; Cariad Lloyd; Holly Walsh	Cariad Lloyd	27 October 2017; 28 October 2017 (XL edition)	1.69
204	3	"Oceans"	Aisling Bea; Joe Lycett; David Mitchell	Joe Lycett	3 November 2017; 4 November 2017 (XL edition)	1.57
205	4	"Over and Ova"	Bill Bailey; Grayson Perry; Jan Ravens	Jan Ravens	10 November 2017; 11 November 2017 (XL edition)	N/A (<1.22)
206	5	"Odorous and Odious"	Nish Kumar; Ross Noble; Sally Phillips	Nish Kumar	24 November 2017; 25 November 2017 (XL edition)	1.29
207	6	"Odds and Ends"	Matt Lucas; Romesh Ranganathan; Liza Tarbuck	Matt Lucas	1 December 2017; 2 December 2017 (XL edition)	1.50
208	7	"Opposites"	Jimmy Carr; Colin Lane; Sara Pascoe	Colin Lane	8 December 2017; 9 December 2017 (XL edition)	1.30
209	8	"Operations"	Bill Bailey; Rhod Gilbert; Katherine Ryan	Katherine Ryan	15 December 2017; 16 December 2017 (XL edition)	1.55
210	9	"O Christmas"	Jason Manford; Romesh Ranganathan; Holly Walsh	All	26 December 2017; 29 December 2017 (XL edition)	1.74
211	10	"Origins and Openings"	Susan Calman; Rich Hall; Josh Widdicombe	Susan Calman	5 January 2018; 6 January 2018 (XL edition)	1.84
212	11	"Objects and Ornaments"	Alice Levine; Cariad Lloyd; Sarah Millican	Cariad Lloyd	12 January 2018; 13 January 2018 (XL edition)	1.75
213	12	"The Occult"	Aisling Bea; Russell Brand; Noel Fielding	Aisling Bea	19 January 2018; 20 January 2018 (XL edition)	1.78
214	13	"Omnishambles"	Stephen K. Amos; Cally Beaton; Josh Widdicombe	Josh Widdicombe	26 January 2018; 27 January 2018 (XL edition)	1.72
215	14	"Oddballs"	Jimmy Carr; Victoria Coren Mitchell; Jason Manford	Victoria Coren Mitchell	2 February 2018; 3 February 2018 (XL edition)	1.71
216	15	"Occupations and Offices"	David Mitchell; Deirdre O'Kane; Richard Osman	David Mitchell	9 February 2018; 10 March 2018 (XL edition)	1.67
217	16	"Overseas"	Bill Bailey; Desiree Burch; Colin Lane	Colin Lane	16 February 2018; 17 February 2018 (XL edition)	1.63
N/A	17	"QI VG: Series O Compilation Show 1"	N/A	N/A	23 February 2018	N/A (<1.42)
N/A	18	"QI VG: Series O Compilation Show 2"	N/A	N/A	2 March 2018	1.48

=== Series P (2018–19) ===
No. overall	No. in series	Title	Guests	Winner(s)	Original release date	Viewers (millions)
218	1	"Panimals"	Danny Baker; Teri Hatcher; Phill Jupitus	Danny Baker	10 September 2018; 13 October 2018 (XL edition)	N/A (<1.89) (Note: Not reported in the weekly top 15 programmes for four-screen viewer ratings.)
219	2	"Peril"	Aisling Bea; Lee Mack; Jason Manford	Aisling Bea	17 September 2018; 20 October 2018 (XL edition)	N/A (<1.79)
220	3	"Piecemeal"	Gyles Brandreth; Jimmy Carr; Sally Phillips	All (Note: The episode had a theme of politeness. In keeping with the theme, when one panellist received points, the other panellists also received points. Instead of reading out scores at the end of the episode, Toksvig awarded prizes to each panellist: Brandreth won "Most Positive Attitude"; Carr won "Tidiest Desk"; Phillips won "Neatest Colouring In"; Davies won "Waggiest Tail".)	24 September 2018; 27 October 2018 (XL edition)	1.56
221	4	"Parts"	Ed Balls; Sara Pascoe; Johnny Vegas	Sara Pascoe	1 October 2018; 3 November 2018 (XL edition)	1.59
222	5	"Public and Private"	Bridget Christie; Victoria Coren Mitchell; Phill Jupitus	Victoria Coren Mitchell	8 October 2018; 10 November 2018 (XL edition)	N/A (<1.69)
223	6	"Pictures"	Noel Fielding; Hannah Gadsby; Joe Lycett	Hannah Gadsby	15 October 2018; 17 November 2018 (XL edition)	1.55
224	7	"Picnics"	Richard Osman; Rachel Parris; Romesh Ranganathan	Romesh Ranganathan	22 October 2018; 24 November 2018 (XL edition)	1.62
225	8	"Plants"	Stephen K. Amos; Jason Manford; Sara Pascoe	Stephen K. Amos	29 October 2018; 1 December 2018 (XL edition)	1.56
226	9	"Pubs"	Noel Fielding; Cariad Lloyd; Josh Widdicombe	Noel Fielding	18 December 2018; 29 December 2018 (XL edition)	1.80
227	10	"Pain & Punishment"	Jimmy Carr; Alice Levine; Lee Mack	Jimmy Carr	11 January 2019; 12 January 2019 (XL edition)	2.12
228	11	"Potpourri"	Cally Beaton; Rhod Gilbert; Phill Jupitus	Phill Jupitus	18 January 2019; 16 March 2019 (XL edition)	1.78
229	12	"Procrastination"	Aisling Bea; Nikki Bedi; Holly Walsh	Holly Walsh	25 January 2019; 4 May 2019 (XL edition)	1.85
230	13	"Phenomena"	Cariad Lloyd; Paul Sinha; Josh Widdicombe	Alan Davies	1 February 2019; 11 May 2019 (XL edition)	1.68
231	14	"Pathological"	Ed Byrne; Rhod Gilbert; Sindhu Vee	Ed Byrne	8 February 2019; 18 May 2019 (XL edition)	1.92
232	15	"Past Times"	Joe Lycett; Ellie Taylor; Phil Wang	Alan Davies and Ellie Taylor	15 February 2019; 9 August 2019 (XL edition)	1.87
233	16	"Post"	Susan Calman; Matt Lucas; Holly Walsh	Matt Lucas	22 February 2019; 16 August 2019 (XL edition)	1.71
N/A	17	"QI VG: Series P Compilation Show 1"	N/A	N/A	1 March 2019	1.28
N/A	18	"QI VG: Series P Compilation Show 2"	N/A	N/A	8 March 2019	1.31

=== Series Q (2019–20) ===
No. overall	No. in series	Title	Guests	Winner(s)	Original release date	Viewers (millions)
234	1	"Quirky"	Loyiso Gola; Jason Manford; Sarah Millican	Loyiso Gola	6 September 2019; 21 September 2019 (XL edition)	N/A (<1.66)
235	2	"Quintessential"	Cariad Lloyd; Holly Walsh; Josh Widdicombe	Holly Walsh	13 September 2019; 2 November 2019 (XL edition)	1.52
236	3	"Quarrels"	Aisling Bea; Jason Manford; Anuvab Pal	Anuvab Pal	20 September 2019; 9 November 2019 (XL edition)	1.86
237	4	"Queasy Quacks"	Stephen K. Amos; Victoria Coren Mitchell; Claudia Winkleman	Stephen K. Amos	27 September 2019; 30 November 2019 (XL edition)	1.80
238	5	"Questions and Qualifications"	Ade Adepitan; Nish Kumar; Holly Walsh	Holly Walsh	4 October 2019; 7 December 2019 (XL edition)	2.01
239	6	"Quests: Part I"	Alan Carr; Phill Jupitus; Alice Levine	Phill Jupitus	11 October 2019; 15 December 2019 (XL edition)	1.75
240	7	"Quests: Part II"	Susan Calman; Joe Lycett; Holly Walsh	Marvin the Paranoid Android (Note: Marvin was awarded 42 points after appearing on the show. Of the panellists, Walsh had the highest score.)	18 October 2019; 4 January 2020 (XL edition)	1.88
241	8	"Qanimals"	Daliso Chaponda; Phill Jupitus; Cariad Lloyd	Daliso Chaponda	25 October 2019; 25 January 2020 (XL edition)	1.73
242	9	"Quizmas"	Sara Pascoe; Johnny Vegas; Josh Widdicombe	Alan Davies	24 December 2019; 27 December 2019 (XL edition)	2.14
243	10	"Quiet"	Jimmy Carr; Andrew Maxwell; Sara Pascoe	Jimmy Carr	3 January 2020; 1 February 2020 (XL edition)	1.95
244	11	"Quaffing"	Jo Brand; Phill Jupitus; Prue Leith	Phill Jupitus	10 January 2020 (Note: This episode's broadcasting in Northern Ireland took place after this date.); 8 February 2020 (XL edition)	2.01
245	12	"Quagmire"	Aisling Bea; Sally Phillips; Sindhu Vee	Sally Phillips	17 January 2020; 15 February 2020 (XL edition)	1.97
246	13	"Quills"	Tom Allen; Jimmy Carr; Lou Sanders	Alan Davies	24 January 2020; 22 February 2020 (XL edition)	2.30
247	14	"Queens"	Colin Lane; Sarah Millican; David Mitchell	Sarah Millican	31 January 2020; 29 February 2020 (XL edition)	2.05
248	15	"Quantity and Quality"	James Acaster; Bridget Christie; Joe Lycett	The Audience	7 February 2020; 4 April 2020 (XL edition)	2.27
249	16	"Quads & Quins"	Aisling Bea; Nish Kumar; David Mitchell	David Mitchell	14 February 2020; 4 May 2020 (XL edition)	2.16
N/A	17	"QI VG: Series Q Compilation Show 1"	N/A	N/A	21 February 2020	1.50
N/A	18	"QI VG: Series Q Compilation Show 2"	N/A	N/A	28 February 2020	N/A (<1.51)

=== Series R (2020–21) ===
No. overall	No. in series	Title	Guests	Winner(s)	Original release date	Viewers (millions)
250	1	"Rude"	John Barrowman; Aisling Bea; Phill Jupitus	John Barrowman	28 May 2020; 29 August 2020 (XL edition)	2.00
251	2	"Ruff & Reddy"	Tom Allen; Susan Calman; Zoe Lyons	Zoe Lyons	4 June 2020; 5 September 2020 (XL edition)	2.33
252	3	"Road & Rail"	Aisling Bea; Cally Beaton; Holly Walsh	Holly Walsh	11 June 2020; 12 September 2020 (XL edition)	2.30
253	4	"Restaurants"	Phill Jupitus; Sara Pascoe; Mark Watson	Alan Davies	18 June 2020; 26 September 2020 (XL edition)	1.95
254	5	"Rubbish"	Bridget Christie; Johnny Vegas; Holly Walsh	Holly Walsh	25 June 2020 (Note: Show was recorded in March 2020 without a studio audience. This was because of restrictions due to the COVID-19 pandemic.); 3 October 2020 (XL edition)	1.82
255	6	"Ridiculous"	Maisie Adam; David Mitchell; Holly Walsh	Holly Walsh	2 July 2020; 10 October 2020 (XL edition)	1.73
256	7	"Revolutions"	Gyles Brandreth; Susan Calman; Jessica Fostekew	Gyles Brandreth	9 July 2020; 30 January 2021 (XL edition)	1.90
257	8	"Reflections"	Joe Lycett; Zoe Lyons; Liza Tarbuck	Zoe Lyons	16 July 2020; 7 November 2020 (XL edition)	1.95
258	9	"Radioactive"	Joe Lycett; Shazia Mirza; Josh Widdicombe	Josh Widdicombe	23 July 2020; 21 November 2020 (XL edition)	2.08
259	10	"Rest & Recreation"	Stephen K. Amos; Susan Calman; Lou Sanders	Susan Calman	30 July 2020; 2 February 2021 (XL edition)	1.89
260	11	"Roaming"	Sara Pascoe; Josh Widdicombe; Benjamin Zephaniah	Benjamin Zephaniah	6 August 2020; 12 February 2021 (XL edition)	1.70
261	12	"Rejoice! A Christmas Special"	Chris McCausland; Justin Moorhouse; Holly Walsh	Everyone (it's Christmas)	23 December 2020; 27 December 2020 (XL edition)	N/A (<1.87)
262	13	"R Animals"	Dr. Maggie Aderin-Pocock; Tom Allen; Ed Gamble	Dr. Maggie Aderin-Pocock	7 January 2021 (XL edition); 27 March 2021	N/A (<1.76) (XL); N/A (<1.95)
263	14	"Rogue"	Bill Bailey; Jack Carroll; Olga Koch	Jack Carroll	14 January 2021; 13 March 2021 (XL edition)	N/A (<1.77)
264	15	"Random"	Bill Bailey; Daliso Chaponda; Sally Phillips	Alan Davies (Note: In keeping with the episode's theme, the points were awarded randomly. Alan Davies was declared the winner with 150,000 points - the weight in kilograms of a blue whale.)	21 January 2021; 20 March 2021 (XL edition)	N/A (<2.06)
265	16	"Rock 'n' Roll"	Eshaan Akbar; Bill Bailey; Katy Brand	Alan Davies	28 January 2021; 1 April 2021 (XL edition)	1.90
N/A	17	"QI VG: Series R Compilation Show 1"	N/A	N/A	13 August 2020	1.49
N/A	18	"QI VG: Series R Compilation Show 2"	N/A	N/A	4 February 2021	N/A (<1.80)

=== Series S (2021–22) ===
No. overall	No. in series	Title	Guests	Winner(s)	Original release date	Viewers (millions)
266	1	"Sick"	Maisie Adam; Jo Brand; Lee Mack	Lee Mack	9 September 2021; 18 February 2022 (XL edition)	1.70
267	2	"Secrets, Spies & Sleuths"	James Acaster; Daliso Chaponda; Cariad Lloyd	Alan Davies	16 September 2021; 25 February 2022 (XL edition)	1.21
268	3	"Shady & Shaky"	Eshaan Akbar; John Barrowman; Victoria Coren Mitchell	Eshaan Akbar	23 September 2021; 4 March 2022 (XL edition)	N/A (<1.44)
269	4	"Sideshows, Stunts and Scavenger Hunts"	Gyles Brandreth; Rosie Jones; Nish Kumar	Rosie Jones	30 September 2021; 16 May 2022 (XL edition)	N/A (<1.56)
270	5	"Sugar & Spice"	Alice Levine; Jason Manford; Rose Matafeo	Rose Matafeo	7 October 2021; 23 May 2022 (XL edition)	N/A (<1.59)
271	6	"Sensational"	Aisling Bea; Roisin Conaty; Jessica Fostekew	Alan Davies	14 October 2021; 30 May 2022 (XL edition)	N/A (<1.62)
272	7	"Spooky"	Zoe Lyons; David Mitchell; Richard Osman	Richard Osman	21 October 2021; 6 June 2022 (XL edition)	1.72
273	8	"Season's Greetings"	Bonnie Langford; Joe Lycett; Sally Phillips	Sally Phillips	20 December 2021; 27 December 2022 (XL edition)	2.76
274	9	"S Animals"	Cally Beaton; Jamali Maddix; Josh Widdicombe	Josh Widdicombe	7 January 2022 (XL edition); 5 July 2022	1.61 (XL)
275	10	"Smörgåsbord"	Jen Brister; Jimmy Carr; Chris McCausland	Chris McCausland	14 January 2022 (XL edition); 28 July 2022	1.66 (XL)
276	11	"Saints & Sinners"	Bridget Christie; Johnny Vegas; Mark Watson	Johnny Vegas	21 January 2022 (XL edition); 9 August 2022	1.82 (XL)
277	12	"Silly Season"	Stephen K. Amos; Ivo Graham; Holly Walsh	Holly Walsh	28 January 2022 (XL edition); 17 August 2022	1.81 (XL)
278	13	"Sun, Sea & Sandi"	Ed Gamble; Lou Sanders; Sindhu Vee	Guy Smart (Note: QI floor manager. The panellists all had a turn on a test-your-strength machine, with their scores on the machine being added to their points from the rest of the show. Smart then also had a turn and achieved the highest score, thus winning the episode. Of the four panellists, Alan Davies had the highest overall score.)	4 February 2022 (XL edition); 14 September 2022	1.65 (XL)
279	14	"Sexed-Up"	Sara Pascoe; Suzi Ruffell; Ahir Shah	Sara Pascoe	11 February 2022 (XL edition); 30 August 2022	1.77 (XL)
N/A	15	"QI VG: Series S Compilation Show 1"	N/A	N/A	15 February 2022	N/A (<1.61)
N/A	16	"QI VG: Series S Compilation Show 2"	N/A	N/A	22 February 2022	N/A (<1.50)

=== Comic Relief Special (2022) ===
No. overall	No. in series	Title	Guests	Winner(s)	Original release date
N/A	N/A	"Comic Relief special" (Note: Special episode as part of the main Comic Relief programme, aired on BBC One.)	Jo Brand; Guz Khan; Sally Phillips	Everyone	18 March 2022

=== Series T (2022–23) ===
No. overall	No. in series	Title	Guests	Winner(s)	Original release date
280	1	"Tips and Tools"	Bill Bailey; Joe Lycett; Holly Walsh	Holly Walsh	11 November 2022; 19 March 2023 (XL edition)
281	2	"'T' Animals"	Desiree Burch; Jason Manford; Hannah Waddingham	Hannah Waddingham	18 November 2022; 26 March 2023 (XL edition)
282	3	"Television"	Greg James; Zoe Lyons; Richard Osman; Basil Brush (Note: Basil came last having scored minus 20 points.)	Richard Osman	25 November 2022; 8 April 2023 (XL edition)
283	4	"Thrills & Spills"	Nish Kumar; Suzi Ruffell; Mark Steel	Mark Steel	2 December 2022; 16 April 2023 (XL edition)
284	5	"Testing"	Maisie Adam; Susan Calman; Josh Widdicombe	Maisie Adam	9 December 2022; 23 April 2023 (XL edition)
285	6	"Tricks & Treats"	Eshaan Akbar; Jimmy Carr; Ria Lina	Ria Lina	16 December 2022; 30 April 2023 (XL edition)
286	7	"Toys, Tinsel, and Turkeys"	Aisling Bea; Gyles Brandreth; Chris McCausland	Gyles Brandreth	19 December 2022 (XL edition); 15 December 2023
287	8	"Ticks Tax Toes"	Rose Matafeo; Ross Noble; Lou Sanders	The Audience	6 January 2023 (XL edition); 9 January 2023
288	9	"Theatrical!"	Cally Beaton; Ed Byrne; Jack Dee	Alan Davies	13 January 2023 (XL edition); 16 January 2023
289	10	"Telling Tails"	Rob Beckett; Daliso Chaponda; Sarah Millican	Rob Beckett	20 January 2023 (XL edition); 23 January 2023
290	11	"Trundling"	Tom Allen; Cariad Lloyd; Jamie MacDonald	Cariad Lloyd	27 January 2023 (XL edition); 30 January 2023
291	12	"This, That and the Other"	Jo Brand; Guz Khan; Sally Phillips	The Audience	3 February 2023 (XL edition); 6 February 2023
292	13	"Tubular"	Bridget Christie; Deborah Frances-White; Sara Pascoe	Deborah Frances-White	10 February 2023 (XL edition); 13 February 2023
293	14	"Tea Time"	Rosie Jones; Ahir Shah; Henning Wehn	Alan Davies	17 February 2023 (XL edition); 21 February 2023
N/A	15	"QI VG: Series T Compilation Show 1"	N/A	N/A	24 February 2023
N/A	16	"QI VG: Series T Compilation Show 2"	N/A	N/A	3 March 2023

=== Series U (2023–24) ===
No. overall	No. in series	Title	Guests	Winner(s)	Original release date
294	1	"All I Want For Christmas Is U"	Eshaan Akbar; Jimmy Carr; Jo Brand	Not stated (Note: At the end of the episode, Toksvig was too busy pouring vodka down an ice sculpture she had made to read out the scores.)	18 December 2023 (XL edition) (Note: The standard-length version of this episode was made available on BBC iPlayer prior to broadcast, on the date the XL version was first aired.)
295	2	"Upside-Down"	Aisling Bea; Urzila Carlson; Romesh Ranganathan	Aisling Bea	5 January 2024 (XL edition); 8 January 2024
296	3	"United"	Nabil Abdulrashid; Bill Bailey; Victoria Coren Mitchell	Victoria Coren Mitchell	12 January 2024 (XL edition); 15 January 2024
297	4	"Unsavoury"	Gyles Brandreth; Judi Love; Kiri Pritchard-McLean	Kiri Pritchard-McLean	19 January 2024 (XL edition); 22 January 2024
298	5	"Uncle Sam"	Kemah Bob; Alex Edelman; David Mitchell	"Team UK" (Note: The players were divided into teams, with the British panellists on one team and the Americans on the other.)	26 January 2024 (XL edition); 29 January 2024
299	6	"Ultras"	Jordan Gray; Jason Manford; Sara Pascoe	Jordan Gray	6 February 2024 (XL edition); 9 February 2024
300	7	"Ufology"	Cally Beaton; Nish Kumar; Tom Ward	Cally Beaton	13 February 2024 (XL edition); 18 February 2024
301	8	"'U' Animals"	Rhod Gilbert; Lara Ricote; Ahir Shah	Ahir Shah	20 February 2024 (XL edition); 23 February 2024
302	9	"Unrelated"	Tom Allen; Chris McCausland; Lou Sanders	Chris McCausland	27 February 2024 (XL edition); 3 March 2024
303	10	"Upsadaisy"	Justin Moorhouse; Emmanuel Sonubi; Holly Walsh	Holly Walsh	26 March 2024 (XL edition); 29 March 2024
304	11	"Underthings"	Maisie Adam; Daliso Chaponda; Jack Dee	Jack Dee	2 April 2024 (XL edition); 5 April 2024
305	12	"University"	Guz Khan; Joe Lycett; Morgana Robinson	Morgana Robinson	9 April 2024 (XL edition); 12 April 2024
306	13	"Upbringing"	Sally Phillips; Josh Pugh; Aaron Simmonds	Sally Phillips	16 April 2024 (XL edition); 19 April 2024
307	14	"Underground and Underwater"	Zoe Lyons; Dan Tiernan; Josh Widdicombe	Josh Widdicombe	23 April 2024 (XL edition); 26 April 2024
308	15	"Ulex"	Bridget Christie; Rosie Jones; Cariad Lloyd	Cariad Lloyd	30 April 2024 (XL edition); 3 May 2024
N/A	16	"QI VG: Series U Compilation Show 1"	N/A	N/A	10 May 2024
N/A	17	"QI VG: Series U Compilation Show 2"	N/A	N/A	17 May 2024

=== Series V (2024–25) ===
No. overall	No. in series	Title	Guests	Winner(s)	Original release date
309	1	"Voyaging"	Nabil Abdulrashid; Joe Lycett; Lou Sanders	Nabil Abdulrashid	22 October 2024 (XL edition); 27 October 2024
310	2	"Vocal"	Ed Byrne; Jimmy Carr; Judi Love	Judi Love	29 October 2024 (XL edition); 3 November 2024
311	3	"Very Varied"	Ross Noble; Sara Pascoe; Sally Phillips	Sally Phillips	5 November 2024 (XL edition); 10 November 2024
312	4	"Vets"	Tom Allen; Melanie Bracewell; Desiree Burch	Melanie Bracewell	12 November 2024 (XL edition); 18 November 2024
313	5	"Visual"	Maisie Adam; Jack Dee; Kiri Pritchard-McLean	Maisie Adam	19 November 2024 (XL edition); 25 November 2024
314	6	"Volatile"	Aisling Bea; Mark Watson; Michelle Wolf	Mark Watson and Michelle Wolf	26 November 2024 (XL edition); 2 December 2024
315	7	"Visionaries"	Cally Beaton; Nish Kumar; Laura Smyth	Nish Kumar	3 December 2024 (XL edition); 9 December 2024
316	8	"Viral"	Rhod Gilbert; Ignacio Lopez; Zoe Lyons	Zoe Lyons	10 December 2024 (XL edition); 16 December 2024
317	9	"Variety"	Gyles Brandreth; Lulu; Emmanuel Sonubi	Not stated	17 December 2024 (XL edition); 22 December 2024
318	10	"Vulgar"	Neil Delamere; Cariad Lloyd; Chris McCausland	Cariad Lloyd	31 December 2024 (XL edition); 6 January 2025
319	11	"Vintage"	Susan Calman; Rosie Jones; Josh Widdicombe	Susan Calman	7 January 2025 (XL edition); 13 January 2025
320	12	"Vices and Virtues"	Eshaan Akbar; Jo Brand; Rhys James	Eshaan Akbar and Rhys James	14 January 2025 (XL edition); 20 January 2025
321	13	"Veggies"	Jason Manford; Ahir Shah; Holly Walsh	Ahir Shah and Holly Walsh	21 January 2025 (XL edition); 26 January 2025
322	14	"Victory"	Rob Beckett; Daliso Chaponda; Lara Ricote	Daliso Chaponda	25 February 2025 (XL edition) (Note: Initially scheduled for 28 January 2025, this episode was pulled at the last minute for unknown reasons.); 3 March 2025 (Note: Initially scheduled for 3 February 2025, this episode was pulled days before broadcast.)
N/A	15	"QI VG: Series V Compilation Show 1"	N/A	N/A	10 February 2025
N/A	16	"QI VG: Series V Compilation Show 2"	N/A	N/A	17 February 2025

=== Series W (2025–26) ===
No. overall	No. in series	Title	Guests	Winner(s)	Original release date
323	1	"Wales, Whales and Wails"	Elis James; Griff Rhys Jones; Kiri Pritchard-McLean	Kiri Pritchard-McLean	21 October 2025 (XL edition); 24 October 2025
324	2	"Wings and Wheels"	Aisling Bea; Desiree Burch; Hank Green	Desiree Burch	28 October 2025 (XL edition); 31 October 2025
325	3	"Weaponry"	Roisin Conaty; Nish Kumar; Lou Sanders	Roisin Conaty	4 November 2025 (XL edition); 7 November 2025
326	4	"Wavey"	Tom Allen; Sara Pascoe; Phil Wang	Alan Davies	11 November 2025 (XL edition); 14 November 2025
327	5	"Wild West"	Eshaan Akbar; Jo Brand; Alex Brooker	Alex Brooker	25 November 2025 (XL edition); 28 November 2025
328	6	"Wooing"	Maisie Adam; Larry Dean; Rosie Jones	Maisie Adam	2 December 2025 (XL edition); 5 December 2025
329	7	"Who What Why?"	Susan Calman; Daliso Chaponda; Cariad Lloyd	Susan Calman	9 December 2025 (XL edition); 11 December 2025
330	8	"Weird and Wonderful"	Melanie Bracewell; Roisin Conaty; Patrick Kielty	Roisin Conaty and Patrick Kielty	16 December 2025 (XL edition); 19 December 2025
331	9	"Winter Wonderland"	Jimmy Carr; Julian Clary; Fatiha El-Ghorri	Alan Davies	23 December 2025 (XL edition); 29 December 2025
332	10	"'W' Animals"	Nabil Abdulrashid; Sam Campbell; Holly Walsh	Alan Davies	6 January 2026 (XL edition); 9 January 2026
333	11	"Wet and Windy"	Ed Byrne; Zoe Lyons; Chris McCausland	Chris McCausland	13 January 2026 (XL edition); 16 January 2026
334	12	"Willy Nilly"	Catherine Bohart; Russell Kane; Josh Widdicombe	Josh Widdicombe	20 January 2026 (XL edition); 23 January 2026
335	13	"Wordmongery"	Cally Beaton; Gyles Brandreth; Michael Odewale	Cally Beaton	27 January 2026 (XL edition); 30 January 2026
336	14	"Whatnots"	Joanne McNally; Andrew Maxwell; Sally Phillips	Sally Phillips	3 February 2026 (XL edition); 6 February 2026
N/A	15	"QI VG: Series W Compilation Show 1"	N/A	N/A	10 February 2026
N/A	16	"QI VG: Series W Compilation Show 2"	N/A	N/A	17 February 2026

=== Series X (2026–27) ===
No. overall	No. in series	Title	Guests	Winner(s)	Original release date
337	1	"XL XS"	Desiree Burch; Sheila Hancock; Gyles Brandreth	The Audience	3 November 2026 (XL edition); 5 November 2026
338	2	"'X' Materials"	Laura Smyth; Susan Calman; Zoe Lyons	Alan Davies	10 November 2026 (XL edition); 11 November 2026
339	3	"X-Rated"	Alex Brooker; Bella Hull; Jamali Maddix	TBA	24 November 2026 (XL edition); 25 November 2026
340	4	"X-Factor"	Kiri Pritchard-McLean; Daniel Sloss; La Voix	TBA	1 December 2026 (XL edition); 2 December 2026
341	5	"Xtra Curricular"	Maisie Adam; Tom Allen; Lewis MacLeod	TBA	8 December 2026 (XL edition); 10 December 2026
