= El train =

El train or L Train may refer to:

- An Elevated railway
- The Chicago "L", a rapid transit system
- The L (SEPTA Metro) in Philadelphia, commonly called "the El"
- L (New York City Subway service)
- L Taraval, streetcar route in San Francisco
- L Line (Los Angeles Metro), a light rail line in Los Angeles County, California

== Nicknames in basketball ==
- "L-Train", nickname for Lionel Simmons (b. 1968)
- "(The) L-Train", nickname for Lionel Hollins (b. 1953)
- "(The) L-Train", nickname for LeBron James (b. 1984)

== See also ==
- L Line (disambiguation)
- 1 Train (disambiguation)
- I Train (disambiguation)
- El (disambiguation)
- The El (novel)
