= International System series =

International System series may refer to:

- International K and KB series
- International L series
- International R series
