= Line 1 =

Line 1 or 1 line may refer to:

== Public transport ==
=== Africa ===
- Line 1 (Algiers Metro), Algeria
- Cairo Metro Line 1, Egypt

=== Asia ===
==== China ====
- Line 1 (Beijing Subway)
- Line 1 (Changchun Rail Transit)
- Line 1 (Changsha Metro)
- Line 1 (Changzhou Metro)
- Line 1 (Chengdu Metro)
- Line 1 (Chengdu Tram) (planned)
- Line 1 (Chongqing Rail Transit)
- Line 1 (Dalian Metro)
- Line 1 (Dongguan Rail Transit)
- Line 1 (Foshan Metro) or Guangfo Metro
- Line 1 (Fuzhou Metro)
- Line 1 (Guangzhou Huangpu Tram)
- Line 1 (Guangzhou Metro)
- Line 1 (Guilin Rail Transit) (under construction)
- Line 1 (Guiyang Metro)
- Line 1 (Hangzhou Metro)
- Line 1 (Harbin Metro)
- Line 1 (Hefei Metro)
- Line 1 (Hohhot Metro)
- Line 1 (Jinan Metro)
- Line 1 (Kunming Metro)
- Line 1 (Lanzhou Metro)
- Line 1 (Luoyang Subway)
- Line 1 (Nanchang Metro)
- Line 1 (Nanhai Tram)
- Line 1 (Nanjing Metro)
- Line 1 (Nanning Metro)
- Line 1 (Nantong Metro)
- Line 1 (Ningbo Rail Transit)
- Line 1 (Qingdao Metro)
- Line 1 (Shanghai Metro)
- Line 1 (Shaoxing Metro)
- Line 1 (Shenyang Metro)
- Line 1 (Shenzhen Metro)
- Line 1 (Shijiazhuang Metro)
- Line 1 (Suzhou Metro)
- Line 1 (Taiyuan Metro)
- Line 1 (Tianjin Metro)
- Line 1 (Ürümqi Metro)
- Line 1 (Wuhan Metro)
- Line 1 (Wuhu Rail Transit)
- Line 1 (Wuxi Metro)
- Line 1 (Xi'an Metro)
- Line 1 (Xiamen Metro)
- Line 1 (Xuzhou Metro)
- Line 1 (Zhengzhou Metro)

==== India ====
- Blue Line (Chennai Metro)
- Red Line (Delhi Metro)
- Red Line (Lucknow Metro)
- Blue Line (Mumbai Metro)
- Orange Line (Nagpur Metro)
- Line 1 (Navi Mumbai Metro)
- Purple Line (Pune Metro)
- Blue Line (Kolkata Metro), the first metro line of Kolkata and of India

==== Japan ====
- Astram Line, Hiroshima
- Higashiyama Line, Nagoya
- Midōsuji Line, Osaka
- Airport Line (Fukuoka)
- Toei Asakusa Line, Tokyo

==== South Korea ====
- Busan Metro Line 1
- Daegu Metro Line 1
- Daejeon Metro Line 1
- Gwangju Metro Line 1
- Incheon Subway Line 1
- Seoul Subway Line 1

==== Other countries in asia ====
- Line 1 (Almaty Metro), Kazakhstan
- Line 1 (Doha Metro) or Red Line, Qatar
- Line 1 (Riyadh Metro), Saudi Arabia
- Line 1 (Yerevan Metro), Armenia
- Line 01 (Phnom Penh Bus Rapid Transit), Cambodia
- LRT Line 1 (Metro Manila), Philippines
- MRT Line 1 (Dhaka Metro Rail), Bangladesh
- MRT Line 1 (Jakarta Mass Rapid Transit), or North–South Line, Indonesia
- Tehran Metro Line 1, Iran
- Batu Caves–Pulau Sebang Line, formerly Seremban Line, Malaysia
- Kajang Line, or MRT Line 1, Malaysia
- Wenhu Line, Taipei, Taiwan

=== Australia ===
- L1 Dulwich Hill Line, Sydney, New South Wales
- T1 North Shore & Western Line, Sydney Trains service, New South Wales

=== Europe ===
==== France ====
- Île-de-France tramway Line 1, Paris
- Paris Metro Line 1

==== Germany ====
- U1 (Berlin U-Bahn)
- U1 (Frankfurt U-Bahn)
- U1 (Hamburg U-Bahn)
- U1 (Munich U-Bahn)
- U1 (Nuremberg U-Bahn)

==== Greece ====
- Line 1 (Athens Metro)
- Line 1 (Thessaloniki Metro)

==== Italy ====
- Line 1 (Naples Metro)
- Milan Metro Line 1

==== Russia ====
- Line 1 (Moscow Metro) or Sokolnicheskaya line
- Line 1 (Nizhny Novgorod Metro)
- Line 1 (Saint Petersburg Metro)

==== Spain ====
- Line 1 (Bilbao Metro)
- Line 1 (Granada Metro)
- Line 1 (Madrid Metro)
- Line 1 (Madrid Light Metro)
- Line 1 (Metrovalencia)
- Barcelona Metro line 1
- Seville Metro line 1

==== Ukraine ====
- Line 1 (Kharkiv Metro)
- Line 1 (Kyiv Metro) or Sviatoshynsko–Brovarska line

==== Other countries in europe ====
- Line 1 (Minsk Metro) or Maskoŭskaja line, Belarus
- U1 (Vienna U-Bahn), Austria
- M1 (Copenhagen Metro), Denmark
- M1 (Warsaw), Poland
- Metro Line M1 (Budapest Metro), Hungary
- Brussels Metro line 1, Belgium
- Bucharest Metro Line M1, Romania

=== North America ===
==== Canada ====
- Line 1 (O-Train) or Confederation Line, Ottawa, Ontario
- Line 1 Yonge–University, Toronto, Ontario
- Green Line (Montreal Metro), officially Line 1, Quebec

==== Mexico ====
- Line 1 of the Guadalajara urban rail system
- Metrorrey Line 1, Monterrey
- Mexico City Metro Line 1
- Mexico City Metrobús Line 1

==== United States ====
- 1 (New York City Subway service), New York
- 1 Line (Sound Transit), Seattle
- Route 1 (MTA Maryland)
- Tempo (bus rapid transit), Line 1T, Oakland, California

==== Other places in North America ====
- Line 1 (Havana Suburban Railway), Cuba
- Line 1 (Santo Domingo Metro), Dominican Republic
- Line 1 (Panama Metro)

=== South America ===
==== Brazil ====
- Line 1 (Baixada Santista LRT), São Paulo
- Line 1 (Rio de Janeiro)
- Line 1 (Rio LRT)
- Line 1 (São Paulo Metro)

==== Other countries in south America ====
- Line 1 (Lima Metro), Peru
- Line 1 (Metrovía), Guayaquil, Ecuador
- Santiago Metro Line 1, Chile

== Other uses ==
- A "one-line whip", an application of a Whip in politics
- LINE1 (a.k.a. L1), a non-LTR retrotransposon and the only Long INterspersed Element (LINE) active in the human genome

== See also ==
- 1 Train (disambiguation)
- First Line (disambiguation)
- One Line (disambiguation)
- I Train (disambiguation)
- L Line (disambiguation)
- List of public transport routes numbered 1
