= L series =

L series may refer to:

== Mathematics ==
- L-function, a meromorphic function
- Dirichlet L-function, in number theory
- Artin L-function, a type of Dirichlet series

== Technology ==
- Canon L lens, in photography
- Sony Vaio L series, desktop computers
- ThinkPad L series, laptop computers
- L-Series, of fire alarm notification appliances by System Sensor

== Transportation ==
- Cummins L-series engine
- Ford L series, trucks
- Honda L engine
- International L series, trucks
- Lincoln L series, 1920 luxury cars
- Mercedes-Benz L-series truck
- Nissan L engine
- Rolls-Royce–Bentley L-series V8 engine
- Rover L-series engine
- Saturn L series, sedans and station wagons
- Subaru Leone, a compact car

== Other uses ==
- QI (L series), a series of television show QI

== See also ==
- 1 series (disambiguation)
