= List of public transport routes numbered 1 =

In public transport, Route 1 may refer to:

- Barcelona Metro line 1
- Line 1 (Beijing Subway)
- Line 1 (Hangzhou Metro)
- Citybus Route 1 in Hong Kong
- KMB Route 1 in Hong Kong
- London Buses route 1
- Route 1 (Malta)
- Manila LRT Yellow Line
- Route 1 (MTA Maryland)
- Route 1 (MBTA) in Massachusetts
- Melbourne tram route 1
- Line 1 Green (Montreal Metro)
- 1 (New York City Subway service)
- 1 California (bus line) in San Francisco
- Seoul Subway Line 1
- Shanghai Metro Line 1
- Line 1 (Shenzhen Metro)
- Line 1 Yonge-University in Toronto
- Transjakarta Corridor 1

== See also ==
- Line 1 (disambiguation)
