= First Line =

First Line, First line, First-line or Firstline can refer to:

- First Line Med, Israeli health charity organization
- Firstline, New Zealand TV news programme
- First Line (comics) (Marvel Comics)
- First line (ice hockey)
- First Line (album), a 1988 album by tubist Bob Stewart
- First-line treatment, in medical treatment
- Primeira Linha (First Line in galician Portuguese), galician communist and independentist party
- Incipit (Latin for "it begins"), the first line of a poem
- Firstline Schools, school operator in New Orleans, US
- The First Line (album), by Marcellus Hall, 2011
- The First Line (magazine), an American literary periodical
- Primera Línea, a Chilean protest group

== See also ==
- One Line (disambiguation)
- Line 1 (disambiguation)
- 1 Train (disambiguation)
