= Number 1 bus =

There are many number 1 bus routes:

In Hong Kong:

- Citybus Route 1
- KMB Route 1

In the United Kingdom:

- London Buses route 1
