= I series =

I series may refer to:

- IBM System i, of computers
- Isuzu i series, of pickup trucks
- QI (I series), a series of the TV quiz show QI
- BMW i, a plug-in electric vehicle sub-brand

== See also ==
- 1 series (disambiguation)
