= I Train =

The I Train may refer to:

- The I Train, a Finnish railway service; see Ring Rail Line
- The nickname of American football player Israel Idonije

== See also ==
- 1 Train (disambiguation)
- l Train (disambiguation)
- One Line (disambiguation)
