= 7 series =

7 series or 7-series may refer to:

- AMD 700 chipset series
- BMW 7 Series
- Boeing 7x7 series
- GeForce 7 series of graphics processors by Nvidia
- Volvo 700 Series
- Windows Phone, formerly known as Windows Phone 7 Series
- IRB Sevens World Series
- 7 Series (EP), an EP by Kid Ink

== See also ==
- 1 series (disambiguation)
