= 1 series =

1 series or 1-series may refer to:

- BMW 1 Series, a car series
- IBM Series/1, a minicomputer series
- Nikon 1 series, a camera series

== See also ==
- 0 series (disambiguation)
- 7 series (disambiguation)
- I series (disambiguation)
- L series (disambiguation)
