= L Line =

Line L may refer to:

- L (New York City Subway service), a New York City subway line
- L-Line (Norfolk Southern), a rail line in North Carolina
- L Line (RTD), a light rail line in Denver
- L Taraval, a streetcar line in San Francisco
- L Line (Los Angeles Metro), a former light rail line in Los Angeles County, California
- L (Los Angeles Railway), a former streetcar line in Los Angeles
- L (SEPTA Metro), one of three subway lines in Philadelphia.

== See also ==
- Chicago "L", the Chicago rapid transit system
- Market-Frankford Line in Philadelphia, known as “the El”
- Ł, letter in the Polish alphabet
- L series (disambiguation)
