= ThinkPad L series =

Series of laptops by Lenovo

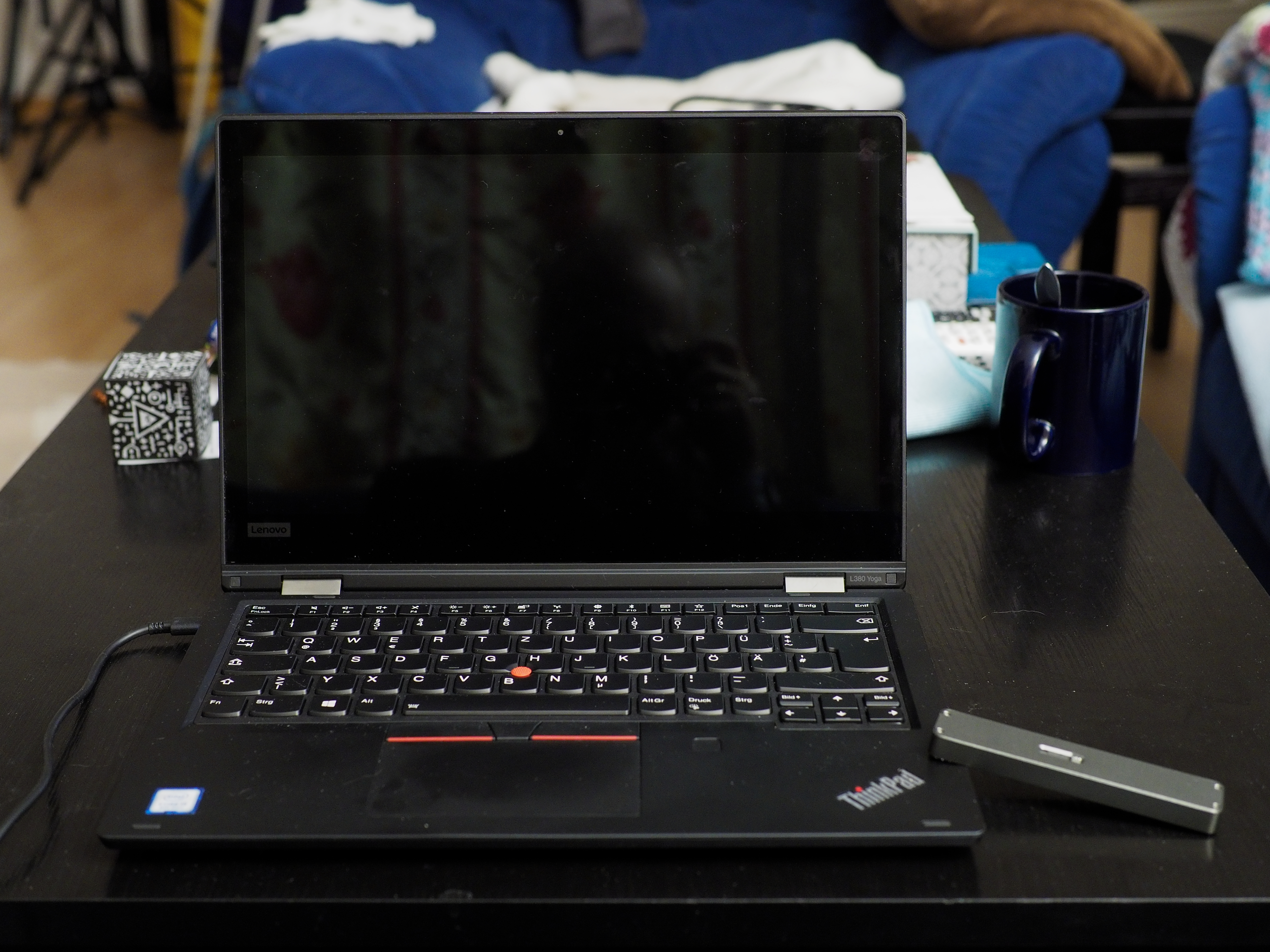
- ThinkPad L380 Yoga
- Developer: Lenovo (2010–present)
- Product family: ThinkPad
- Type: Mid-range business laptop
- Released: April 2010
- CPU: Intel Celeron, AMD APU, Intel Core, AMD Ryzen
- Predecessor: ThinkPad R series ThinkPad 13 (13" only)

The ThinkPad L series is a line of notebook computers from Lenovo as part of the ThinkPad family. As opposed to the ThinkPad T and X series, the L series has an added focus on economy and value; they are the entry-level range for enterprise use, and are also used by students. The ThinkPad L series was introduced in 2010 replacing the R series.

== Overview ==
The L series were originally designed with the theme of "green". The first laptops in the series were described by Lenovo as being the environmentally friendliest products in the ThinkPad range. Key features that contributed to the eco-friendly tag were the use of recycled material for packaging and post-consumer recycled content (such as office water jugs and used IT equipment).

The ThinkPad R series introduced Lenovo's new product naming system, as indicated in the published tech specs. The R61 laptop was replaced with the R400 and R500. The first digit in the name referred to the display screen size of the product. The R400 laptop had a 14.1" display, while the R500 laptop had a 15.4" display. From the R series onwards, all ThinkPad models transitioned to widescreen displays.

== Models ==
Lenovo ThinkPad R series 2008–2010 Lenovo ThinkPad L series 2010–2023
Screen	Type	R*0* (2008)	L*1* (2010)	L*2* (2011)	L*3* (2012)	L*4* (2013)	L*5* (2015)	L*6* (2016)	L*7* (2017)	L*8* (2018)	L*9* (2019)	2020	2021	2022	2023	2024
13.3"	Flipbook	predecessor: 370 Yoga								L380; Yoga	L390; Yoga	L13 Yoga; Gen1	L13 Yoga; Gen2	L13 Yoga; Gen3	L13 Yoga; Gen4	L13 2-in-1 Gen5
13.3"	Standard	predecessor: ThinkPad 13								L380	L390	L13 Gen1	L13 Gen2	L13 Gen3	L13 Gen4	L13 Gen5
14"	Standard	R400	L412	L420	L430	L440	L450	L460	L470	L480	L490	L14 Gen1	L14 Gen2	L14 Gen3	L14 Gen4	L14 Gen5
14"	Standard	R400	L410	L421	L430	L440	L450	L460	L470	L480	L490	L14 Gen1	L14 Gen2	L14 Gen3	L14 Gen4	L14 Gen5
15.6"	Standard	R500	L512	L520	L530	L540		L560	L570	L580	L590	L15 Gen1	L15 Gen2	L15 Gen3	L15 Gen4	replaced by L16
15.6"	Standard	R500	L510	L520	L530	L540		L560	L570	L580	L590	L15 Gen1	L15 Gen2	L15 Gen3	L15 Gen4	replaced by L16
16"	Standard															L16 Gen1

Battery configuration

Main	M(x)	Main hot-swappable (max.cells)	Secondary	U	Ultrabay removable
Main	M(x)	Main hot-swappable (max.cells)	Secondary	u	Ultrabay unremovable
Main	M(x)	Main removable (max.cells)	Secondary	m(x)	internal (max.cells) "PowerBridge"
Main	m(x)	Main internal (max.cells)	Secondary	S	Slice battery

Laptop color codes

Processor

Socketed desktop processor
Socketed mobile processor
Soldered high power processor
Soldered standard power processor
Soldered low power processor
Soldered ultra low power processor

Weight

0.9 kg (2.0 lb)	Up to 0.91 kg
1.0 kg (2.2 lb)	0.92–1.0 kg
1.1 kg (2.4 lb)	1.01–1.1 kg
1.2 kg (2.6 lb)	1.11–1.2 kg
1.3 kg (2.9 lb)	1.21–1.3 kg
1.4 kg (3.1 lb)	1.31–1.4 kg
1.5 kg (3.3 lb)	1.41–1.5 kg
1.6 kg (3.5 lb)	1.51–1.6 kg
1.7 kg (3.7 lb)	1.61–1.7 kg
1.8 kg (4.0 lb)	1.71–1.81 kg
1.9 kg (4.2 lb)	1.81–1.91 kg
2.0 kg (4.4 lb)	1.91–2.03 kg
2.1 kg (4.6 lb)	2.04–2.14 kg
2.3 kg (5.1 lb)	2.15–2.4 kg
2.5 kg (5.5 lb)	2.41–2.75 kg
2.8 kg (6.2 lb)	2.76–3.05 kg
3.1 kg (6.8 lb)	3.06–3.42 kg
3.5 kg (7.7 lb)	3.43–3.99 kg
4.0 kg (8.8 lb)	4.0–4.99 kg
5.5 kg (12 lb)	5.0–6.49 kg
7.2 kg (16 lb)	6.5–7.99 kg
9.1 kg (20 lb)	8.0–9.99 kg
10.7 kg (24 lb)	10–11.99 kg
12.7 kg (28 lb)	12–14.49 kg
14.5 kg (32 lb)	14.5–17.99 kg
18.1 kg (40 lb)	18–20.99 kg
21.7 kg (48 lb)	21–23.99 kg
24 kg (53 lb)	24–28.99 kg
29.5 kg (65 lb)	29 kg and above

Screen resolution

4K or higher
1440p+ (WQHD, QXGA)
1080p+ (Full HD, UXGA)
Better than 768p (SXGA,SXGA+)
600p+ (SVGA, HD, XGA, HD+)
Up to 600p (VGA)

Graphics

Dual standard socket graphics option
Dual proprietary socket graphics option
Standard socket graphics option
Proprietary socket graphics option
Soldered performance graphics option
Soldered midrange graphics option
Soldered mainstream graphics option
Soldered entry graphics option
Integrated entry graphics
Integrated basic graphics

Laptop storage combinations (excluding WWAN slot)

Level	PCIe 4.0 x4	PCIe 3.0 x4	PCIe 3.0 x2	M.2 SATA	mSATA	1.8" SATA	2.5" SATA	1.8" IDE	2.5" IDE
	2019; Not yet (laptops)	2013	2013	2013	2009	2003	2003	1991	1988
	3						2		
	4								
	3						1		
	2						2		
	3					2			
	3								
	2						1		
	4								
	3					1			
	2					2			
	2								
	1						1		
	3								
	2					1			
	1								
	2								
	1					1			
			2				1		
							4		
		1							
			1				1		
							3		
			1						
				1			1		
					1		1		
						1	1		
							2		
									3
						1			
							1		
									2
								1	
									1

Laptop memory

Amount	LPDDR5X	LPDDR5	DDR5	LPDDR4X	LPDDR4	DDR4	LPDDR3	DDR4	DDR3L		DDR3		DDR2		DDR	SDR	EDO	FPM
Amount						dual channel		< dual channel	dual channel	< dual channel	dual channel	< dual channel	dual channel	< dual channel				
Amount	2022 (laptops)	2019 (laptops)	2020	2017	2014	2014	2012	2014	2010		2007		2003		1998	1993	1993	1987
max memory = 512 GB	N/A	N/A	512 GB	N/A	N/A	N/A	N/A	N/A	N/A	N/A	N/A	N/A	N/A	N/A	N/A	N/A	N/A	N/A
max memory = 256 GB	N/A		256 GB (4 slots)	N/A	N/A	N/A	N/A	N/A	N/A	N/A	N/A	N/A	N/A	N/A	N/A	N/A	N/A	N/A
max memory = 128 GB	128 GB		128 GB	N/A	N/A	128 GB (4 slots)	N/A	N/A	N/A	N/A	N/A	N/A	N/A	N/A	N/A	N/A	N/A	N/A
64 GB ≤ max memory < 128 GB		64 GB		N/A	N/A	64 GB	N/A	64 GB (2 slots)	64 GB (4 slots)	N/A	N/A	N/A	N/A	N/A	N/A	N/A	N/A	N/A
32 GB ≤ max memory < 64 GB				32 GB	32 GB	32 GB	N/A		32 GB	32 GB (2 slots)	32 GB (4 slots)	N/A	N/A	N/A	N/A	N/A	N/A	N/A
16 GB ≤ max memory < 32 GB						16 GB	16 GB		16 GB		16 GB	16 GB (2 slots)	16 GB (4 slots)	N/A	N/A	N/A	N/A	N/A
8 GB ≤ max memory < 16 GB						8 GB			8 GB		8 GB		8 GB	8 GB (2 slots)	8 GB (4 slots)	N/A	N/A	N/A
4 GB ≤ max memory < 8 GB						4 GB			4 GB		4 GB		4 GB		4 GB	4 GB (4 slots)	4 GB (4 slots)	N/A
2 GB ≤ max memory < 4 GB						2 GB (8 chips)			2 GB		2 GB		2 GB			2 GB	2 GB	N/A
1 GB ≤ max memory < 2 GB			1 GB (1 chip)	dual channel min	dual channel min	N/A		single channel min	1 GB		1 GB		1 GB					1 GB (4 slots)
512 MB ≤ max memory < 1 GB	N/A	N/A	N/A	single channel min	single channel min	N/A	dual channel min	half channel min	512 MB (8 chips)		512 MB (8 chips)		512 MB					512 MB
256 MB ≤ max memory < 512 MB	N/A	N/A	N/A	256 MB (1 chip)	256 MB (1 chip)	N/A	single channel min	256 MB (1 chip)	N/A	single channel min	N/A	single channel min	256 MB					
128 MB ≤ max memory < 256 MB	N/A	N/A	N/A	N/A	N/A	N/A	128 MB (1 chip)	N/A	N/A	half channel min	N/A	half channel min						
64 MB ≤ max memory < 128 MB	N/A	N/A	N/A	N/A	N/A	N/A	N/A	N/A	N/A	64 MB (1 chip)	N/A	64 MB (1 chip)						
max memory < 64 MB	N/A	N/A	N/A	N/A	N/A	N/A	N/A	N/A	N/A	N/A	N/A	N/A						

=== 2010 ===
The L series laptops were launched in 2010 to replace the R series. The first two L series models – the ThinkPad L412 and the ThinkPad L512 laptops – were predicted to be launched on Earth Day in 2010. The L410 and L510 models ships only in an India market.

==== L412 and L512 ====
The L412 and L512 laptops met eight military specifications, including parameters for high and low temperature, vibration, altitude and dust. However, the L-series laptops remained relatively lightweight starting at 5.2 lbs (≈2.36 kg). The L-series models were also reputed to be Lenovo's greenest laptops. Lenovo indicated that they were 40% more power efficient than other laptops, and were made from recycled plastic from office water jugs and miscellaneous used equipment.

The L-series laptops were made available with a variety of options, allowing them to be customized to handle business demands, or used as entry-level laptops. The laptops could be equipped with Intel Core i3 or i5 processors, integrated graphics, or discrete AMD Radeon graphics. Alternatively, the L-series entry-level model included a Celeron P4500 CPU, GB hard disk, and 1 GB RAM.

The L series was designed to improve on the features of the R series laptops. L-series laptops were reputed to increase performance over the R series by 150% and improve boot and shutdown times on Windows by 57%. The laptop chassis was also 11% thinner and 12% lighter than the R-series models it was introduced to replace.

Upon release, the ThinkPad L412 was praised by reviewers, with Laptop Magazine calling it a "value-priced business notebook". The review also praised the laptop for green features, performance, and ergonomic design.

The L412 was well received by Laptop Magazine, with the reviewer giving the laptop a score of 4 out of 5 stars. Similarly, NOTEBOOKCHECK gave the ThinkPad L412 laptop a score of 75% (good) from an average of five scores from seven reviews. PCWorld listed the pros of the ThinkPad L412 laptop as being eco-friendly and affordable, while stating that the cons were the loud keyboard and low battery life.

The ThinkPad L512 also received positive reviews, with reviewers comparing it with both the ThinkPad T series and the ThinkPad SL series. NotebookReview.com noted that the L512 was almost identical to comparable SL-series laptops in appearance, with "a consumer take on the rugged, business-oriented T-series ThinkPad". The review also indicated that the chassis flex was less than the Edge 15, but more than the T-series laptops. The L512 was praised for its screen protection with no distortion on the LCD despite heavy pressure applied to the cover, and the easy access to internal components. The green features of the L512 also received notice, with Notebook Review stating that "The L series offers up to 30% post-consumer content, LED-backlit screens and green packaging that takes up 20% less space."

===== 14" (L412) =====
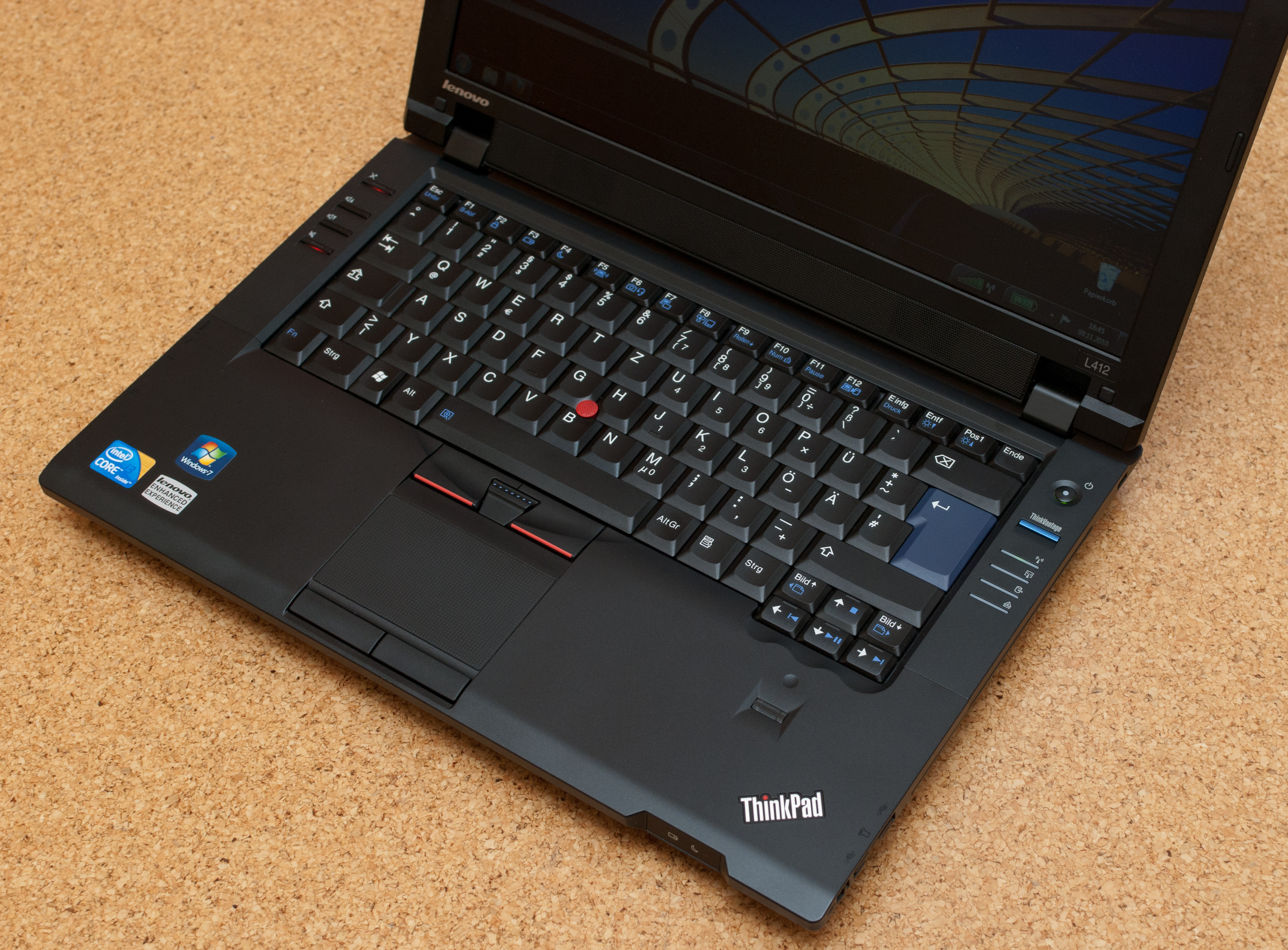
ThinkPad L412

The L412 has a 14.0-inch display.

===== 15" (L512) =====
The L512 has a 15.6-inch display.

Model	Release (US)	Dimensions	Weight ^{(min)}	CPU	Chipset	Memory ^{(max)}	Graphics	Storage	Networking	Screen	Battery	Other
14"
L412	2010		2.23 kg (4.9 lb)	Celeron or 1st Gen Intel Core	Intel HM55	8 GB DDR3 — 1333 MHz (2 slots)	Intel HD Graphics	One 2.5" SATA; One DVD Drive	Gigabit Ethernet; Wi-Fi Half Mini PCIe Card; Optional BT 2.1 Module; Optional WWAN Mini PCIe Card (exclusive)	Anti-glare: 1366×768 TN	M(9)	
L410	2010 (Only in India)		2.15 kg (4.7 lb)	Penryn Celeron, Pentium or Core 2 Duo	Intel GM45 or GL40	8 GB DDR3 — 1333 MHz (2 slots)	Intel GMA or AMD Radeon Graphics	One 2.5" SATA; One DVD Drive	Gigabit Ethernet; Wi-Fi Half Mini PCIe Card; Optional BT 2.1 Module; Optional WWAN Mini PCIe Card	Anti-glare: 1366×768 TN	M(9)	
15.6"
L512	2010		2.49 kg (5.5 lb)	Celeron or 1st Gen Intel Core	Intel HM55	8 GB DDR3 — 1333 MHz (2 slots)	Intel HD Graphics	One 2.5" SATA; One DVD Drive	Gigabit Ethernet; Wi-Fi Half Mini PCIe Card; Optional BT 2.1 Module; Optional WWAN Mini PCIe Card (exclusive)	Anti-glare: 1366×768 TN	M(9)	

=== 2011 ===
In February 2011, the ThinkPad L420 and L520 were announced by Lenovo.

==== L420 and L520 ====
Continuing the naming convention, the L420 has a 14" display, while the L520 has a 15" display.

The 2011 line of L-series laptops included up to second generation Intel i7 processors, Intel HD Graphics or options for AMD Radeon discrete graphics, Lenovo Enhanced Experience 2.0 for Windows 7, and solid-state storage drives. The L420 and L520 laptops offered battery life of up to 11.5 hours and 10.8 hours respectively with the optional 9-cell battery. Lenovo also indicated that the L-series laptops are lighter than similar, competing products.

The L420 and L520 continued the series trend of environmentally friendly features. The L series offered savings on operating costs of 40% annually, as compared to previous generation ThinkPads. The L420 and L520 also featured up to 30% post-consumer recycled content. According to Lenovo, office jugs and used IT equipment had been recycled into different L-series parts including the screen cover, the palm rest, and the top and bottom case. As with most ThinkPad laptops, the L-series models featured certifications from Energy Star and EPEAT Gold.

The Laptop Magazine review of the ThinkPad L420 indicated the pros as being the "great keyboard, affordable price, good battery life, and quick boot time". The battery life marked an improvement over the ThinkPad L412, which was criticized for its low battery life. Laptop Magazine indicated that the cons were weak audio, multitouch gestures, and bland design. Other reviews did not raise similar comments about design. For example, Zimbio only indicated that the L420 comes in a "simple, all-black design". However, the audio was criticized by Zimbio as well, with the reviewer indicating that the sound was slightly muffled.

The L520 was awarded a Business Buy award from Expert Reviews, which indicated in its review that the laptop would appeal to users who preferred "function over form". The review praised the laptop for performance. Points raised about the display were that the backlight was suitably bright and even, and while colors were clear, they were not as vibrant as those found on a glossy screen. This was suggested by the reviewer to be due to the matte finish on the screen, meant to reduce glare from overhead lighting. The keyboard was lauded, with the reviewers praising the large, molded keys that gave 'great feedback'. The only point of contention was the function key, replacing the Control key at the bottom left corner of the keyboard.

===== 14" (L420) =====
The L420 has a 14.0-inch display.

===== 15" (L520) =====
The L520 has a 15.6-inch display.

Model	Release (US)	Dimensions	Weight ^{(min)}	CPU	Chipset	Memory ^{(max)}	Graphics	Storage	Networking	Screen	Battery	Other	Operating System
14"
L420	2011		2.24 kg (4.9 lb)	Celeron or 2nd Gen Intel Core	Intel HM65	16 GB DDR3 — 1333 MHz (2 slots)	Intel HD Graphics 3000	One 2.5" SATA; One DVD Drive	Gigabit Ethernet; Wi-Fi Half Mini PCIe Card; Optional BT 3.0 Module; Optional WWAN mSATA Card	Anti-glare: 1366×768 TN	M(9)		
L421	2011		2.3 kg								Warning icon		
15.6"													
L520	2011		2.51 kg (5.5 lb)	Celeron or 2nd Gen Intel Core	Intel HM65	16 GB DDR3 — 1333 MHz (2 slots)	Intel HD Graphics 3000	One 2.5" SATA; One DVD Drive	Gigabit Ethernet; Wi-Fi Half Mini PCIe Card; Optional BT 3.0 Module; Optional WWAN mSATA Card	Anti-glare: 1366×768 TN; 1600×900 TN	M(9)		

=== 2012 ===
In May 2012, the ThinkPad L430 and L530 were announced by Lenovo.

==== L430 and L530 ====
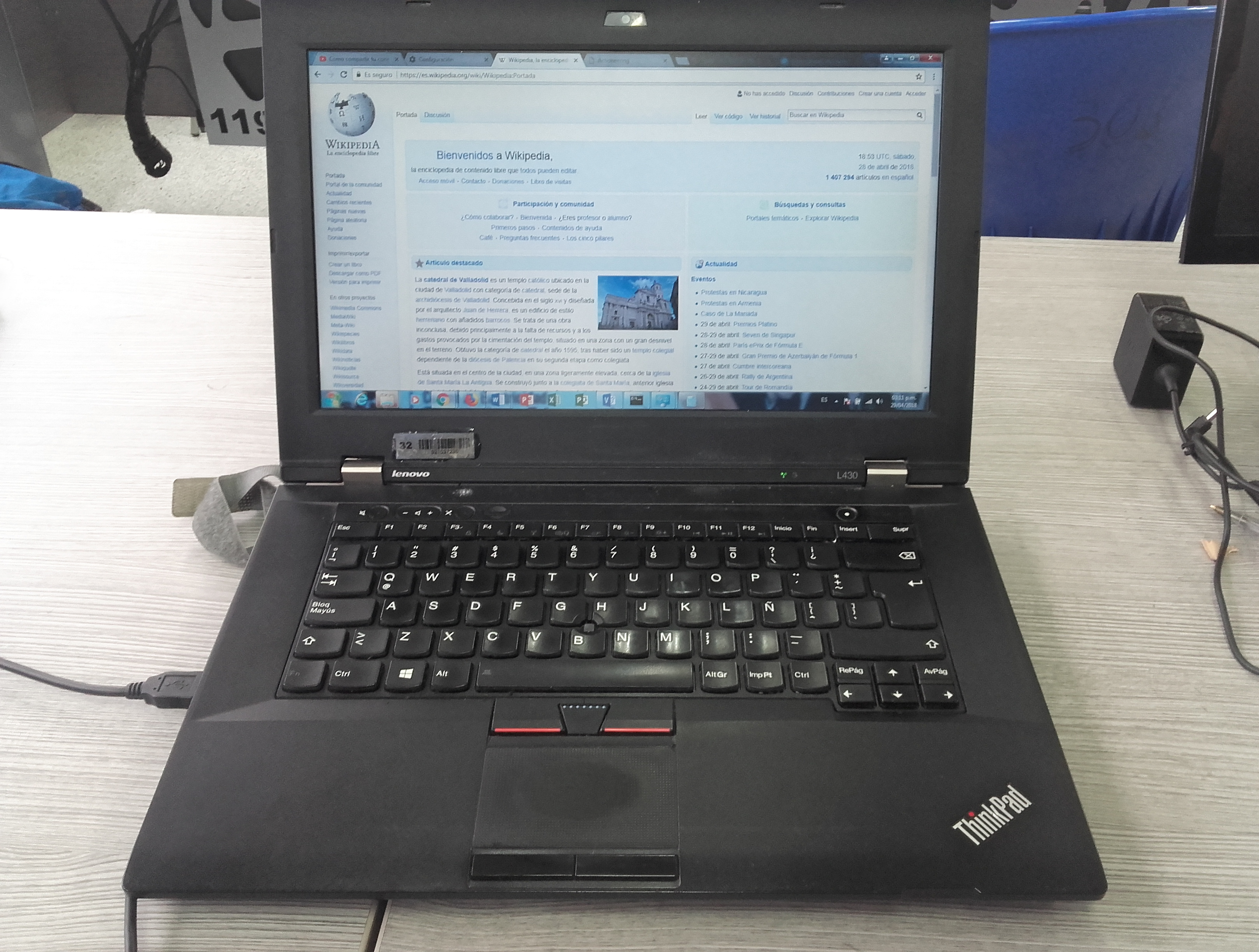
ThinkPad L430

The L430 and L530 replaced the L420 and L520. They have the new, island type keyboard.

===== 14" (L430) =====
The L430 has a 14.0-inch display.

===== 15" (L530) =====
The L530 has a 15.6-inch display.

Model	Release (US)	Dimensions	Weight ^{(min)}	CPU	Chipset	Memory ^{(max)}	Graphics	Storage	Networking	Screen	Battery	Other
14"
L430	2012		2.32 kg (5.1 lb)	Celeron, or 2nd or 3rd Gen Intel Core	Intel HM76	16 GB DDR3L — 1600 MHz (2 slots)	Intel HD Graphics 3000 OR 4000	One 2.5" SATA; One DVD Drive	Gigabit Ethernet; Wi-Fi Half Mini PCIe Card; Optional BT 4.0 Module; Optional WWAN mSATA Card	Anti-glare: 1366×768 TN; 1600×900 TN	M(9)	
15.6"
L530	2012		2.58 kg (5.7 lb)	Celeron, or 2nd or 3rd Gen Intel Core	Intel HM76	16 GB DDR3L — 1600 MHz (2 slots)	Intel HD Graphics 3000 OR 4000	One 2.5" SATA; One DVD Drive	Gigabit Ethernet; Wi-Fi Half Mini PCIe Card; Optional BT 4.0 Module; Optional WWAN mSATA Card	Anti-glare: 1366×768 TN; 1600×900 TN	M(9)	

=== 2013 ===
==== L440 and L540 ====
Introduced in October 2013, these feature the new 4th-gen Haswell Intel CPUs, and the new press-to-click 5-point touchpad, integrating the trackpoint's buttons with the top of the touchpad.

===== 14" (L440) =====
The L440 has a 14.0-inch display.

===== 15" (L540) =====
The L540 has a 15.6-inch display.

Model	Release (US)	Dimensions	Weight ^{(min)}	CPU	Chipset	Memory ^{(max)}	Graphics	Storage	Networking	Screen	Battery	Other
14"
L440	2013		2.25 kg (5.0 lb)	Celeron or 4th Gen Intel Core		16 GB DDR3L — 1600 MHz (2 slots)	Intel HD Graphics or Intel HD Graphics 4600	One 2.5" SATA; One DVD Drive	Gigabit Ethernet; Wi-Fi + BT M.2 Card; Optional WWAN M.2 SATA Card	Anti-glare: 1366×768 TN; 1600×900 TN	M(9)	
15.6"
L540	2013		2.52 kg (5.6 lb)	Celeron or 4th Gen Intel Core		16 GB DDR3L — 1600 MHz (2 slots)	Intel HD Graphics or Intel HD Graphics 4600	One 2.5" SATA; One DVD Drive	Gigabit Ethernet; Wi-Fi + BT M.2 Card; Optional WWAN M.2 SATA Card	Anti-glare: 1366×768 TN; 1920×1080 TN	M(9)	

=== 2014 ===
==== L450 ====
Features the 4th-gen Haswell Intel CPUs and the 5th-gen Broadwell Intel CPUs.

===== 14" (L450) =====
The L450 has a 14.0-inch display.

Model	Release (US)	Dimensions	Weight ^{(min)}	CPU	Chipset	Memory ^{(max)}	Graphics	Storage	Networking	Screen	Battery	Other
14"
L450	2014		1.93 kg (4.3 lb)	Celeron, or 4th or 5th Gen Intel Core		32 GB DDR3L — 1600 MHz (2 slots)	Intel HD Graphics, or Intel HD Graphics 4400 or 5500	One 2.5" SATA	Gigabit Ethernet; Wi-Fi + BT M.2 Card; Optional WWAN M.2 SATA Card	Anti-glare: 1366×768 TN; 1920×1080 IPS	M(6)	

=== 2016 ===
==== L460 and L560 ====
Introduced in first quarter 2016, these feature the new 6th-gen Skylake Intel CPUs.

===== 14" (L460) =====
The L460 has a 14.0-inch display.

===== 15" (L560) =====
The L560 has a 15.6-inch display.

Model	Release (US)	Dimensions	Weight ^{(min)}	CPU	Chipset	Memory ^{(max)}	Graphics	Storage	Networking	Screen	Battery	Other
14"
L460	2016		1.93 kg (4.3 lb)	Celeron or 6th Gen Intel Core		32 GB DDR3L — 1600 MHz (2 slots)	Intel HD 510 or 520	One 2.5" SATA	Gigabit Ethernet; Wi-Fi + BT M.2 Card; Optional WWAN M.2 Card (exclusive)	Anti-glare: 1366×768 TN; 1920×1080 IPS	M(6)	
15.6"
L560	2016		2.38 kg (5.2 lb)	Celeron or 6th Gen Intel Core		32 GB DDR3L — 1600 MHz (2 slots)	Intel HD 510 or 520	One 2.5" SATA; Optional One DVD Drive	Gigabit Ethernet; Wi-Fi + BT M.2 Card; Optional WWAN M.2 Card (exclusive)	Anti-glare: 1366×768 TN; 1920×1080 IPS	M(6)	

=== 2017 ===
==== L470 and L570 ====
Introduced in first quarter 2017, these feature the new 7th-gen Kabylake Intel CPUs.

===== 14" (L470) =====
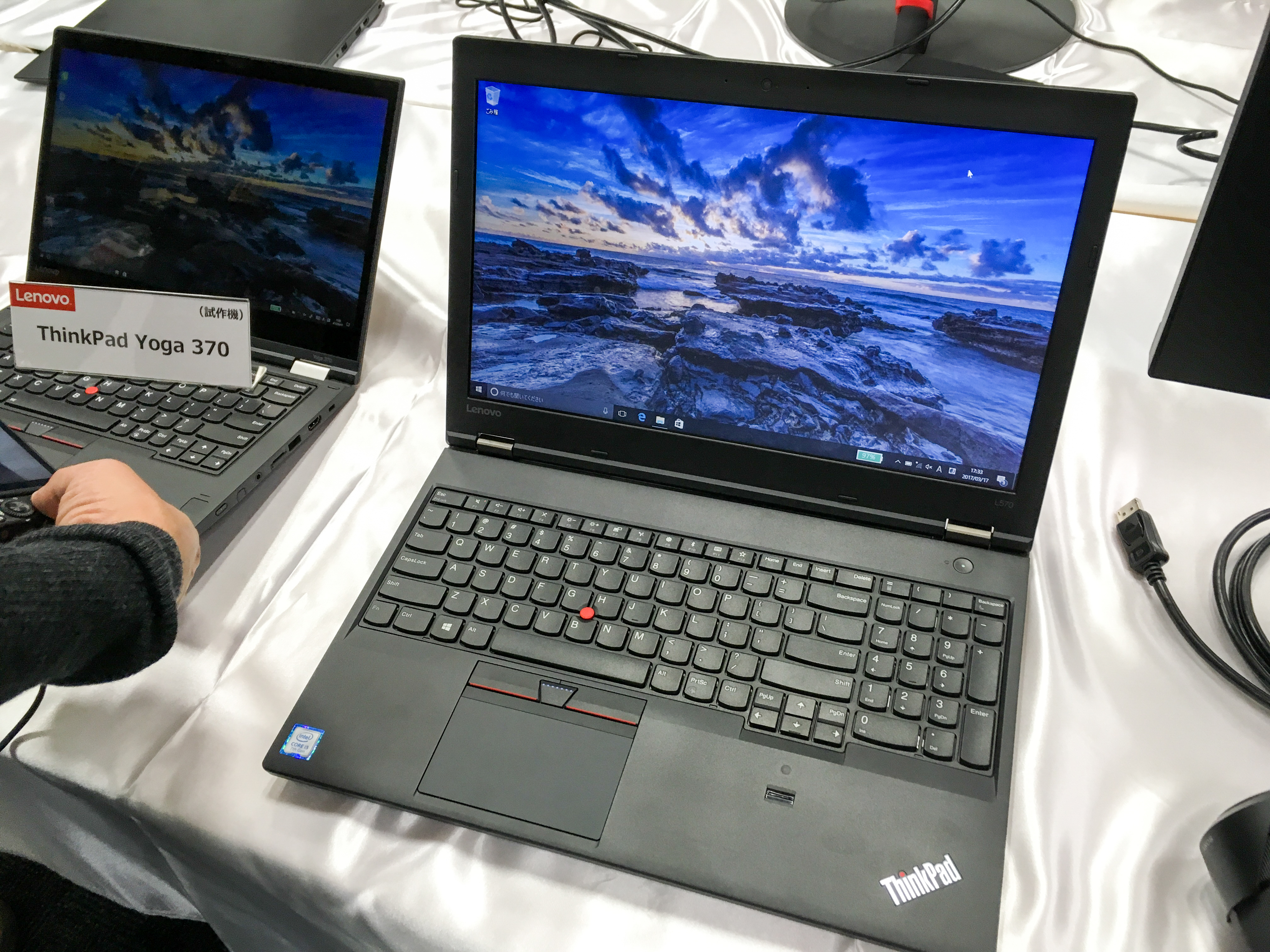
ThinkPad L570

The L470 has a 14.0-inch display.

===== 15" (L570) =====
The L570 has a 15.6-inch display.

Model	Release (US)	Dimensions	Weight ^{(min)}	CPU	Chipset	Memory ^{(max)}	Graphics	Storage	Networking	Screen	Battery	Other
14"
L470	2017		1.87 kg (4.1 lb)	Celeron, or 6th or 7th Gen Intel Core		64 GB DDR4 — 2133 MHz (2 slots)	Intel HD 520, 610 or 620	One 2.5" SATA or One M.2 x2	Gigabit Ethernet; Wi-Fi + BT M.2 Card; Optional WWAN M.2 SATA Card	Anti-glare: 1366×768 TN; 1920×1080 IPS	M(6)	
15.6"
L570	2017		2.38 kg (5.2 lb)	Celeron, or 6th or 7th Gen Intel Core		64 GB DDR4 — 2133 MHz (2 slots)	Intel HD 520, 610 or 620	One 2.5" SATA or One M.2 x2 Optional One DVD Drive	Gigabit Ethernet; Wi-Fi + BT M.2 Card; Optional WWAN M.2 SATA Card	Anti-glare: 1366×768 TN; 1920×1080 TN; 1920×1080 IPS	M(6)	

=== 2018 ===
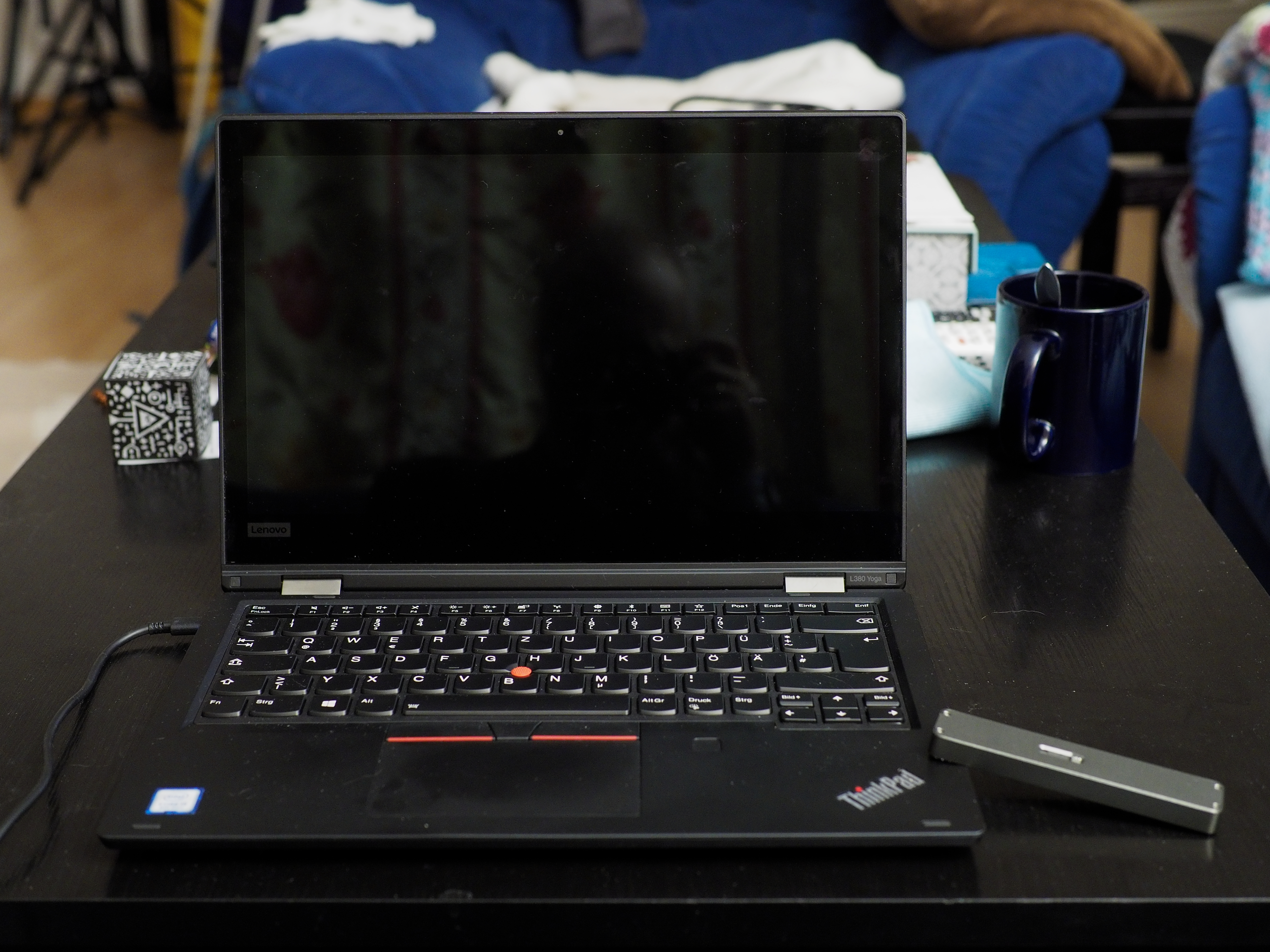
ThinkPad L380 Yoga

==== L380, L380 Yoga, L480, and L580 ====
Introduced in first quarter 2018, these feature Celeron, 7th-gen, or the new 8th-gen Kaby Lake-R Intel CPUs.

===== 13" (L380, L380 Yoga) =====
The L380 and L380 Yoga have a 13.3-inch display. The Yoga is convertible.

===== 14" (L480) =====
The L480 has a 14.0-inch display.

===== 15" (L580) =====
The L580 has a 15.6-inch display.

Model	Release (US)	Dimensions	Weight ^{(min)}	CPU	Chipset	Memory ^{(max)}	Graphics	Storage	Networking	Screen	Battery	Other
13.3"
L380	2018		1.46 kg (3.2 lb)	Celeron, or 7th or 8th Gen Intel Core		64 GB DDR4 — 2133 or 2400 (8th Gen) MHz (2 slots)	Intel HD 610, 620, or UHD 620	One M.2 x4	Mini Gigabit Ethernet; Wi-Fi + BT M.2 Card	Anti-glare: 1366×768 TN; 1920×1080 IPS; 1920×1080 IPS Touch (on-cell)	m	
L380 Yoga	2018		1.56 kg (3.4 lb)	7th or 8th Gen Intel Core		64 GB DDR4 — 2133 or 2400 (8th Gen) MHz (2 slots)	Intel HD 620 or UHD 620	One M.2 x4	Mini Gigabit Ethernet; Wi-Fi + BT M.2 Card	Anti-glare: 1920×1080 IPS; 1920×1080 IPS Touch	m	Soldered charging port
14"
L480	2018		1.68 kg (3.7 lb)	Celeron, or 7th or 8th Gen Intel Core		64 GB DDR4 — 2133 or 2400 (8th Gen) MHz (2 slots)	Intel HD 610, 620, or UHD 620	One 2.5" SATA 7mm or One M.2 x2	Gigabit Ethernet; Wi-Fi + BT M.2 Card; Optional WWAN M.2 x2 Card	Anti-glare: 1366×768 TN; 1920×1080 IPS; 1920×1080 IPS Touch (on-cell)	m	ThinkShutter; Soldered charging port
15.6"
L580	2018		2.0 kg (4.4 lb)	Celeron, or 7th or 8th Gen Intel Core		64 GB DDR4 — 2133 or 2400 (8th Gen) MHz (2 slots)	Intel HD 610, 620, or UHD 620	One 2.5" SATA 7mm or One M.2 x2	Gigabit Ethernet; Wi-Fi + BT M.2 Card; Optional WWAN M.2 x2 Card	Anti-glare: 1366×768 TN; 1920×1080 IPS	m	ThinkShutter; Soldered charging port

=== 2019 ===
==== L390, L390 Yoga, L490, and L590 ====
Introduced in first quarter 2019, these feature Celeron or the new 8th-gen Whiskey Lake Intel CPUs.

===== 13" (L390, L390 Yoga) =====
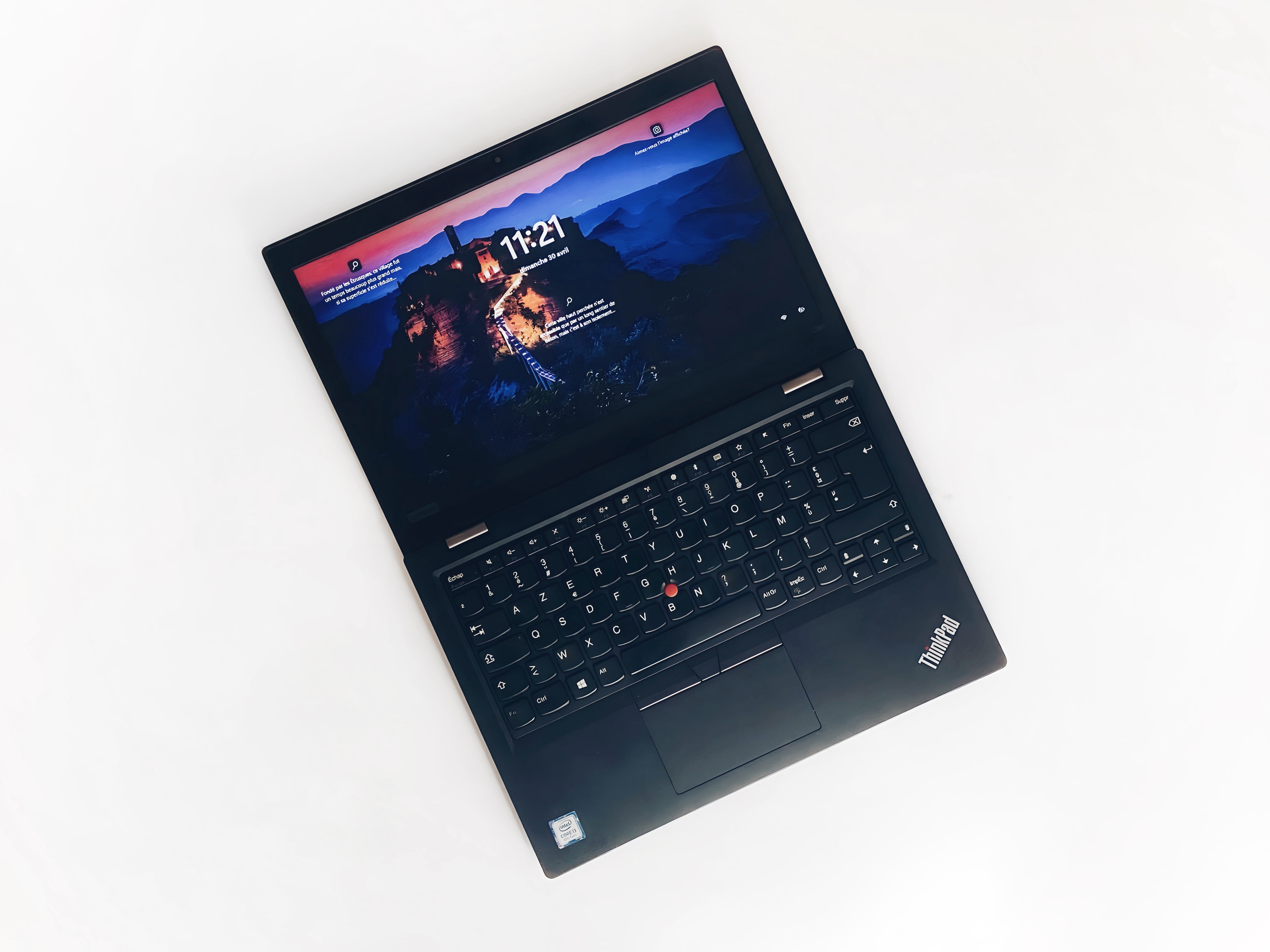
ThinkPad L390

The L390 and L390 Yoga have a 13.3-inch display. The Yoga is convertible.

===== 14" (L490) =====
The L490 has a 14.0-inch display.

===== 15" (L590) =====
The L590 has a 15.6-inch display.

Model	Release (US)	Dimensions	Weight ^{(min)}	CPU	Chipset	Memory ^{(max)}	Graphics	Storage	Networking	Screen	Battery	Other
13.3"
L390	2019		1.46 kg (3.2 lb)	Celeron or 8th Gen Intel Core		64 GB DDR4 — 2400 MHz (2 slots)	Intel UHD Graphics	One M.2 x4	Mini Gigabit Ethernet; Wi-Fi + BT M.2 Card	Anti-glare: 1366×768 TN; 1920×1080 IPS; 1920×1080 IPS Touch (on-cell)	m	
L390 Yoga	2019		1.56 kg (3.4 lb)	8th Gen Intel Core		64 GB DDR4 — 2400 MHz (2 slots)	Intel UHD Graphics	One M.2 x4	Mini Gigabit Ethernet; Wi-Fi + BT M.2 Card	Anti-glare: 1920×1080 IPS Touch	m	
14"
L490	2019		1.69 kg (3.7 lb)	Celeron or 8th Gen Intel Core		64 GB DDR4 — 2400 MHz (2 slots)	Intel UHD Graphics	One 2.5" SATA 7mm or One M.2 x2	Gigabit Ethernet; Wi-Fi + BT M.2 Card; Optional WWAN M.2 x2 Card	Anti-glare: 1366×768 TN; 1920×1080 IPS; 1920×1080 IPS Touch (on-cell)	m	ThinkShutter
15.6"
L590	2019		2.03 kg (4.5 lb)	Celeron or 8th Gen Intel Core		64 GB DDR4 — 2400 MHz (2 slots)	Intel UHD Graphics	One 2.5" SATA 7mm or One M.2 x2	Gigabit Ethernet; Wi-Fi + BT M.2 Card; Optional WWAN M.2 x2 Card	Anti-glare: 1366×768 TN; 1920×1080 IPS; 1920×1080 IPS Touch (on-cell)	m	ThinkShutter

=== 2020 ===
==== L13, L13 Yoga, L14, and L15 ====
Introduced between the last of quarter 2019 and the beginning of 2020, these feature Celeron, Pentium Gold, the new 10th-gen Intel Core CPUs, or 3rd-gen Ryzen Mobile.

===== 13" (L13, L13 Yoga) =====
The L13 and L13 Yoga have a 13.3-inch display. The Yoga is convertible.

===== 14" (L14) =====
The L14 has a 14.0-inch display.

===== 15" (L15) =====
The L15 has a 15.6-inch display.

Model	Release (US)	Dimensions	Weight ^{(min)}	CPU	Chipset	Memory ^{(max)}	Graphics	Storage	Networking	Screen	Battery	Other
13.3"
L13	2019		1.38 kg (3.0 lb)	Celeron or 10th Gen Intel Core		4/8/16 GB DDR4 — 2400 (Celeron) or 2666 MHz (soldered)	Intel UHD Graphics	One M.2 x4	Mini Gigabit Ethernet; Wi-Fi + BT M.2 Card	Anti-glare: 1366×768 TN; 1920×1080 IPS; 1920×1080 IPS Touch (on-cell)	m	ThinkShutter
L13 Yoga	2019		1.43 kg (3.2 lb)	10th Gen Intel Core		4/8/16 GB DDR4 — 2666 MHz (soldered)	Intel UHD Graphics	One M.2 x4	Mini Gigabit Ethernet; Wi-Fi + BT M.2 Card	Anti-glare: 1920×1080 IPS Touch	m	ThinkShutter
14"
L14 (Intel)	2019		1.61 kg (3.5 lb)	Pentium Gold or 10th Gen Intel Core		64 GB DDR4 — 2400 (Pentium) or 2666 MHz (2 slots)	Intel UHD Graphics	One 2.5" SATA 7mm or One M.2 x4	Gigabit Ethernet; Wi-Fi + BT M.2 Card; Optional WWAN M.2 x2 Card	Anti-glare: 1366×768 TN; 1920×1080 IPS; 1920×1080 IPS Touch (on-cell)	m	ThinkShutter
L14 (AMD)	2020		1.61 kg (3.5 lb)	3rd Gen AMD Ryzen Mobile		64 GB DDR4 — 3200 MHz (2 slots)	AMD Radeon 7 nm Vega 6 or 7	One M.2 x4	Gigabit Ethernet; Wi-Fi + BT M.2 Card; Optional WWAN M.2 x? Card (?)	Anti-glare: 1366×768 TN; 1920×1080 IPS; 1920×1080 IPS Touch (on-cell)	m	ThinkShutter
15.6"
L15 (Intel)	2019		1.98 kg (4.4 lb)	Celeron or 10th Gen Intel Core		64 GB DDR4 — 2400 (Celeron) or 2666 MHz (2 slots)	Intel UHD Graphics	One 2.5" SATA 7mm or One M.2 x4	Gigabit Ethernet; Wi-Fi + BT M.2 Card; Optional WWAN M.2 x2 Card	Anti-glare: 1366×768 TN; 1920×1080 IPS; 1920×1080 IPS Touch (on-cell)	m	ThinkShutter
L15 (AMD)	2020		1.98 kg (4.4 lb)	3rd Gen AMD Ryzen Mobile		64 GB DDR4 — 3200 MHz (2 slots)	AMD Radeon 7 nm Vega 6 or 7	One M.2 x4	Gigabit Ethernet; Wi-Fi + BT M.2 Card; Optional WWAN M.2 x? Card (?)	Anti-glare: 1366×768 TN; 1920×1080 IPS; 1920×1080 IPS Touch (on-cell)	m	ThinkShutter

=== 2021 ===
==== L15 Gen 2 (AMD) ====
Model	Release (US)	Dimensions (mm / in)	Weight ^{(min)}	CPU	Chipset	Memory ^{(max)}	Graphics	Storage	Networking	Screen	Battery	Other
13.3"
L13 Gen 2 (Intel)	Nov 2020	311.5 × 219 × 17.6; 12.26 × 8.62 × 0.69	1.39 kg (3.1 lb)	Celeron 6305 or 11th Gen Intel Core i3-1115G4 i5-1135G7 i5-1145G7 i7-1165G7 i7-1185G7		4/8/16 GB DDR4 — 3200 MHz ()	Intel UHD (Celeron/G4) or Intel Iris Xe G7	One M.2 x4 Drive	Mini Gigabit Ethernet Intel Wi-Fi 6 AX201 + BT 5.1 (); No WWAN	1366 × 768 TN; 1920 × 1080 IPS 250 nits 1920 × 1080 IPS Touch	m 46Wh	One TB4; One USB-C 3.2 Gen 2
L13 Gen 2 (AMD)	2021	311.5 × 219 × 17.6; 12.26 × 8.62 × 0.69	1.39 kg (3.1 lb)	4th Gen AMD Ryzen Mobile; Ryzen 3 5400U; Ryzen 5 5600U; Ryzen 5 Pro 5650U; Ryzen 7 Pro 5850U		8/16 GB DDR4 — 3200 MHz ()	AMD Radeon	One M.2 x4 Drive	Mini Gigabit Ethernet Intel Wi-Fi 6 AX200 + BT 5.1 (); No WWAN	1366 × 768 TN; 1920 × 1080 IPS 250 nits 1920 × 1080 IPS Touch	m 46Wh	One USB-C 3.2 Gen 1 One USB-C 3.2 Gen 2
L13 Yoga Gen 2 (Intel)	Aug 2021	311.5 × 219 × 17.6; 12.26 × 8.62 × 0.69	1.44 kg (3.2 lb)	11th Gen Intel Core i3-1115G4 i5-1135G7 i5-1145G7 i7-1165G7 i7-1185G7		4/8/16 GB DDR4 — 3200 MHz ()	Intel UHD (G4) or Intel Iris Xe G7	One M.2 x4 Drive	Mini Gigabit Ethernet Intel Wi-Fi 6 AX201 + BT 5.1 (); No WWAN	1920 × 1080 IPS Touch 300 nits	m 46Wh	One TB4; One USB-C 3.2 Gen 2
L13 Yoga Gen 2 (AMD)	Aug 2021	311.5 × 219 × 17.6; 12.26 × 8.62 × 0.69	1.44 kg (3.2 lb)	4th Gen AMD Ryzen Mobile; Ryzen 3 5400U; Ryzen 5 5600U; Ryzen 5 Pro 5650U; Ryzen 7 Pro 5850U		8/16 GB DDR4 — 3200 MHz ()	AMD Radeon	One M.2 x4 Drive	Mini Gigabit Ethernet Intel Wi-Fi 6 AX200 + BT 5.1 (); No WWAN	1920 × 1080 IPS Touch 300 nits	m 46Wh	One USB-C 3.2 Gen 1 One USB-C 3.2 Gen 2
14"
L14 Gen 2 (Intel)	Jan 2021	331 × 235 × 19.1–20.4; 13.03 × 9.25 × 0.75–0.80	1.59–1.74 kg (3.5–3.8 lb)	Pentium Gold 7505 or 11th Gen Intel Core i3-1115G4 i5-1135G7 i5-1145G7 i7-1165G7 i7-1185G7		64 GB DDR4 — 3200 MHz	Intel UHD (Pentium/G4) or Intel Iris Xe G7; Optional NVIDIA GeForce MX450 (2 GB GDDR6)	One M.2 x4 Drive + One 2.5" HDD OR One M.2 x4 Drive	Gigabit Ethernet Wi-Fi 6, 802.11ax + BT 5.1 (); Optional WWAN M.2 Card	1366 × 768 TN; 1920 × 1080 IPS 250 nits 1920 × 1080 400 nits Low Power; 1920 × 1080 IPS Touch	m 45Wh	One TB4; One USB-C 3.2 Gen 1
L14 Gen 2 (AMD)	Aug 2021	331 × 235 × 20.4; 13.03 × 9.25 × 0.80	1.59 kg (3.5 lb)	4th Gen AMD Ryzen Mobile; Ryzen 3 5400U; Ryzen 3 Pro 5450U; Ryzen 5 5600U; Ryzen 5 Pro 5650U; Ryzen 7 Pro 5850U		64 GB DDR4 — 3200 MHz	AMD Radeon	One M.2 x4 Drive	Gigabit Ethernet Wi-Fi 6, 802.11ax + BT 5.1 (); Optional WWAN M.2 Card	1366 × 768 TN; 1920 × 1080 IPS 250 nits 1920 × 1080 400 nits Low Power; 1920 × 1080 IPS Touch	m 45Wh	One USB-C 3.2 Gen 1 One USB-C 3.2 Gen 2
15.6"
L15 Gen 2 (Intel)	Feb 2021	366.5 × 250 × 21; 14.43 × 9.84 × 0.83	1.99 kg (4.4 lb)	Celeron 6305 or 11th Gen Intel Core i3-1115G4 i5-1135G7 i5-1145G7 i7-1165G7 i7-1185G7		64 GB DDR4 — 3200 MHz	Intel UHD (Pentium/G4) or Intel Iris Xe G7; Optional NVIDIA GeForce MX450 (2 GB GDDR6)	One M.2 x4 Drive + One 2.5" HDD OR One M.2 x4 Drive	Gigabit Ethernet Wi-Fi 6, 802.11ax + BT 5.1 (); Optional WWAN M.2 Card	1366 × 768 TN; 1920 × 1080 IPS 250 nits 1920 × 1080 IPS Touch	m 45Wh	One TB4; One USB-C 3.2 Gen 1
L15 Gen 2 (AMD)	Jul 2021	366.5 × 250 × 21; 14.43 × 9.84 × 0.83	1.99 kg (4.4 lb)	4th Gen AMD Ryzen Mobile; Ryzen 3 5400U; Ryzen 3 Pro 5450U; Ryzen 5 5600U; Ryzen 5 Pro 5650U; Ryzen 7 Pro 5850U		64 GB DDR4 — 3200 MHz	AMD Radeon	One M.2 x4 Drive	Gigabit Ethernet Wi-Fi 6, 802.11ax + BT 5.1 (); Optional WWAN M.2 Card	1366 × 768 TN; 1920 × 1080 IPS 250 nits 1920 × 1080 IPS Touch	m 45Wh	One USB-C 3.2 Gen 1 One USB-C 3.2 Gen 2

=== 2022 ===
==== L15 Gen 3 (AMD) ====
Model	Release (US)	Dimensions (mm / in)	Weight ^{(min)}	CPU	Chipset	Memory ^{(max)}	Graphics	Storage	Networking	Screen	Battery	Other
13.3"
L13 Gen 3 (Intel)	May 2022	305 × 218 × 17.3; 12.01 × 8.58 × 0.68	1.26 kg (2.8 lb)	12th Gen Intel Core i3-1215U i5-1235U i5-1245U i7-1255U i7-1265U		8/16/32 GB DDR4 — 3200 MHz ()	Intel UHD (1215U) or Intel Iris Xe	One M.2 x4 Drive	No onboard Ethernet Intel Wi-Fi 6E AX211 + BT 5.1 (); Optional WWAN M.2 Card	1920 × 1200 IPS 300 nits 1920 × 1200 500 nits Privacy Guard; 1920 × 1080 IPS Touch	m 46Wh	One TB4; One USB-C 3.2 Gen 2
L13 Gen 3 (AMD)	May 2022	305 × 218 × 17.3; 12.01 × 8.58 × 0.68	1.26 kg (2.8 lb)	4th Gen AMD Ryzen Mobile; Ryzen 3 5425U; Ryzen 5 5625U; Ryzen 5 Pro 5675U; Ryzen 7 5825U; Ryzen 7 Pro 5875U		8/16/32 GB DDR4 — 3200 MHz ()	AMD Radeon	One M.2 x4 Drive	No onboard Ethernet AMD Wi-Fi 6E RZ616/QC NFA725A + BT 5.1 (); Optional WWAN M.2 Card	1920 × 1200 IPS 300 nits 1920 × 1200 500 nits Privacy Guard; 1920 × 1080 IPS Touch	m 46Wh	Two USB-C 3.2 Gen 2
L13 Yoga Gen 3 (Intel)	May 2022	305 × 218 × 17.1; 12.01 × 8.58 × 0.67	1.32 kg (2.9 lb)	12th Gen Intel Core i3-1215U i5-1235U i5-1245U i7-1255U i7-1265U		8/16/32 GB DDR4 — 3200 MHz ()	Intel UHD (1215U) or Intel Iris Xe	One M.2 x4 Drive	No onboard Ethernet Intel Wi-Fi 6E AX211 + BT 5.1 (); Optional WWAN M.2 Card	1920 × 1200 IPS Touch 300/500 nits	m 46Wh	One TB4; One USB-C 3.2 Gen 2
L13 Yoga Gen 3 (AMD)	May 2022	305 × 218 × 17.1; 12.01 × 8.58 × 0.67	1.31 kg (2.9 lb)	4th Gen AMD Ryzen Mobile; Ryzen 3 5425U; Ryzen 5 5625U; Ryzen 5 Pro 5675U; Ryzen 7 5825U; Ryzen 7 Pro 5875U		8/16/32 GB DDR4 — 3200 MHz ()	AMD Radeon	One M.2 x4 Drive	No onboard Ethernet AMD Wi-Fi 6E RZ616/QC NFA725A + BT 5.1 (); Optional WWAN M.2 Card	1920 × 1200 IPS Touch 300/500 nits	m 46Wh	Two USB-C 3.2 Gen 2
14"
L14 Gen 3 (Intel)	May 2022	325.4 × 217 × 18.73–19.83; 12.81 × 8.54 × 0.74–0.78	1.39 kg (3.1 lb)	Pentium Gold 8505; 12th Gen Intel Core i3-1215U i5-1235U i5-1245U i7-1255U i7-1265U i5-1240P i5-1250P i7-1260P		64 GB DDR4 — 3200 MHz	Intel UHD (Pentium/1215U) or Intel Iris Xe	One M.2 x4 Drive	Gigabit Ethernet Intel Wi-Fi 6 AX201 + BT 5.1 (); Optional WWAN M.2 Card	1366 × 768 TN; 1920 × 1080 IPS 250 nits 1920 × 1080 400 nits Low Power; 1920 × 1080 IPS Touch	m 42Wh; 57Wh; 63Wh	One TB4; One USB-C 3.2 Gen 1
L14 Gen 3 (AMD)	Apr 2022	325.4 × 217 × 18.73–19.83; 12.81 × 8.54 × 0.74–0.78	1.39 kg (3.1 lb)	4th Gen AMD Ryzen Mobile; Ryzen 3 5425U; Ryzen 3 Pro 5475U; Ryzen 5 5625U; Ryzen 5 Pro 5675U; Ryzen 7 5825U; Ryzen 7 Pro 5875U		64 GB DDR4 — 3200 MHz	AMD Radeon	One M.2 x4 Drive	Gigabit Ethernet AMD Wi-Fi 6E RZ616 / QCNFA765 + BT 5.1 (); Optional WWAN M.2 Card	1366 × 768 TN; 1920 × 1080 IPS 250 nits 1920 × 1080 400 nits Low Power; 1920 × 1080 IPS Touch	m 42Wh; 57Wh; 63Wh	One USB-C 3.2 Gen 1 One USB-C 3.2 Gen 2
15.6"
L15 Gen 3 (Intel)	May 2022	360.2 × 237 × 19.93; 14.18 × 9.33 × 0.78	1.76 kg (3.9 lb)	Pentium Gold 8505; 12th Gen Intel Core i3-1215U i5-1235U i5-1245U i7-1255U i7-1265U i5-1240P i5-1250P i7-1260P		64 GB DDR4 — 3200 MHz	Intel UHD (Pentium/1215U) or Intel Iris Xe	One M.2 x4 Drive	Gigabit Ethernet Intel Wi-Fi 6 AX201 + BT 5.1 (); Optional WWAN M.2 Card	1920 × 1080 IPS 250 nits 1920 × 1080 IPS Touch	m 42Wh; 57Wh; 63Wh	One TB4; One USB-C 3.2 Gen 1
L15 Gen 3 (AMD)	Apr 2022	360.2 × 237 × 19.93; 14.18 × 9.33 × 0.78	1.76 kg (3.9 lb)	4th Gen AMD Ryzen Mobile; Ryzen 3 5425U; Ryzen 3 Pro 5474U; Ryzen 5 5625U; Ryzen 5 Pro 5675U; Ryzen 7 5825U; Ryzen 7 Pro 5875U		64 GB DDR4 — 3200 MHz	AMD Radeon	One M.2 x4 Drive	Gigabit Ethernet AMD Wi-Fi 6E RZ616 / QCNFA765 + BT 5.1 (); Optional WWAN M.2 Card	1920 × 1080 IPS 250 nits 1920 × 1080 IPS Touch	m 42Wh; 57Wh; 63Wh	One USB-C 3.2 Gen 1 One USB-C 3.2 Gen 2

=== 2023 ===
==== L15 Gen 4 (AMD) ====
Model	Release (US)	Dimensions (mm / in)	Weight ^{(min)}	CPU	Chipset	Memory ^{(max)}	Graphics	Storage	Networking	Screen	Battery	Other
13.3"
L13 Gen 4 (Intel)	Apr 2023	305 × 218 × 17.23; 12.01 × 8.58 × 0.68	1.26 kg (2.8 lb)	13th Gen Intel Core i3-1315U i5-1335U i5-1345U i5-1355U i5-1365U		8/16/32 GB DDR4 — 3200 MHz ()	Intel UHD (i3-1315U) or Intel Iris Xe	One M.2 x4 Drive	No onboard Ethernet Intel Wi-Fi 6E AX211 + BT 5.1 (); Optional WWAN M.2 Card	1920 × 1200 IPS 300 nits 1920 × 1200 IPS 400 nits Low Power; 1920 × 1080 IPS Touch	m 46Wh	One TB4; One USB-C 3.2 Gen 2
L13 Gen 4 (AMD)	Apr 2023	305 × 218 × 17.23; 12.01 × 8.58 × 0.68	1.26 kg (2.8 lb)	6th Gen AMD Ryzen Mobile; Ryzen 3 Pro 7330U; Ryzen 5 Pro 7530U; Ryzen 7 Pro 7730U		8/16/32 GB DDR4 — 3200 MHz ()	AMD Radeon	One M.2 x4 Drive	No onboard Ethernet Intel Wi-Fi 6E AX211 + BT 5.1 (); Optional WWAN M.2 Card	1920 × 1200 IPS 300 nits 1920 × 1200 IPS 400 nits Low Power; 1920 × 1080 IPS Touch	m 46Wh	Two USB-C 3.2 Gen 2
L13 Yoga Gen 4 (Intel)	Jul 2023	305 × 218 × 17.06; 12.01 × 8.58 × 0.67	1.32 kg (2.9 lb)	13th Gen Intel Core i3-1315U i5-1335U i5-1345U i5-1355U i5-1365U		8/16/32 GB LPDDR5 — 4800 MHz ()	Intel UHD (i3-1315U) or Intel Iris Xe	One M.2 x4 Drive	No onboard Ethernet Intel Wi-Fi 6E AX211 + BT 5.1 (); Optional WWAN M.2 Card	1920 × 1200 IPS Touch 300 nits 1920 × 1200 IPS Touch 400 nits Low Power	m 46Wh	One TB4; One USB-C 3.2 Gen 2
L13 Yoga Gen 4 (AMD)	Jul 2023	305 × 218 × 17.06; 12.01 × 8.58 × 0.67	1.31 kg (2.9 lb)	6th Gen AMD Ryzen Mobile; Ryzen 3 Pro 7330U; Ryzen 5 Pro 7530U; Ryzen 7 Pro 7730U		8/16/32 GB DDR4 — 3200 MHz ()	AMD Radeon	One M.2 x4 Drive	No onboard Ethernet Intel Wi-Fi 6E AX211 + BT 5.1 (); Optional WWAN M.2 Card	1920 × 1200 IPS Touch 300 nits 1920 × 1200 IPS Touch 400 nits Low Power	m 46Wh	Two USB-C 3.2 Gen 2
14"
L14 Gen 4 (Intel)	May 2023	325.4 × 217 × 18.73–19.83; 12.81 × 8.54 × 0.74–0.78	1.4 kg (3.1 lb)	13th Gen Intel Core U300 i3-1315U i5-1335U i5-1340P i5-1345U i5-1350P i5-1355U i5-1360P i5-1365U		64 GB DDR4 — 3200 MHz	Intel UHD (U300/i3-1315U) or Intel Iris Xe Optional NVIDIA GeForce MX550 (2 GB GDDR6)	One M.2 x4 Drive	Gigabit Ethernet Intel Wi-Fi 6E AX211 + BT 5.1 (); Optional WWAN M.2 Card	1366 × 768 TN; 1920 × 1080 IPS 250 nits 1920 × 1080 IPS 400 nits Low Power; 1920 × 1080 IPS Touch	m 46.5Wh; 57Wh; 63Wh	One TB4; One USB-C 3.2 Gen 2
L14 Gen 4 (AMD)	May 2023	325.4 × 217 × 18.73–19.83; 12.81 × 8.54 × 0.74–0.78	1.4 kg (3.1 lb)	6th Gen AMD Ryzen Mobile; Ryzen 3 Pro 7330U; Ryzen 5 Pro 7530U; Ryzen 7 Pro 7730U		64 GB DDR4 — 3200 MHz	AMD Radeon	One M.2 x4 Drive	Gigabit Ethernet AMD Wi-Fi 6E RZ616 + BT 5.1 (); Optional WWAN M.2 Card	1366 × 768 TN; 1920 × 1080 IPS 250 nits 1920 × 1080 IPS 400 nits Low Power; 1920 × 1080 IPS Touch	m 46.5Wh; 57Wh; 63Wh	Two USB-C 3.2 Gen 2
15.6"
L15 Gen 4 (Intel)	May 2023	360.2 × 237 × 19.93; 14.18 × 9.33 × 0.78	1.77 kg (3.9 lb)	13th Gen Intel Core U300 i3-1315U i5-1335U i5-1340P i5-1345U i5-1350P i5-1355U i5-1360P i5-1365U		64 GB DDR4 — 3200 MHz	Intel UHD (U300/i3-1315U) or Intel Iris Xe Optional NVIDIA GeForce MX550 (2 GB GDDR6)	One M.2 x4 Drive	Gigabit Ethernet Intel Wi-Fi 6E AX211 + BT 5.1 (); Optional WWAN M.2 Card	1920 × 1080 IPS 250 nits 1920 × 1080 IPS Touch	m 46.5Wh; 57Wh; 63Wh	One TB4; One USB-C 3.2 Gen 2
L15 Gen 4 (AMD)	May 2023	360.2 × 237 × 19.93; 14.18 × 9.33 × 0.78	1.77 kg (3.9 lb)	6th Gen AMD Ryzen Mobile; Ryzen 3 Pro 7330U; Ryzen 5 Pro 7530U; Ryzen 7 Pro 7730U		64 GB DDR4 — 3200 MHz	AMD Radeon	One M.2 x4 Drive	Gigabit Ethernet AMD Wi-Fi 6E RZ616 + BT 5.1 (); Optional WWAN M.2 Card	1920 × 1080 IPS 250 nits 1920 × 1080 IPS Touch	m 46.5Wh; 57Wh; 63Wh	Two USB-C 3.2 Gen 2
