= International K and KB series =

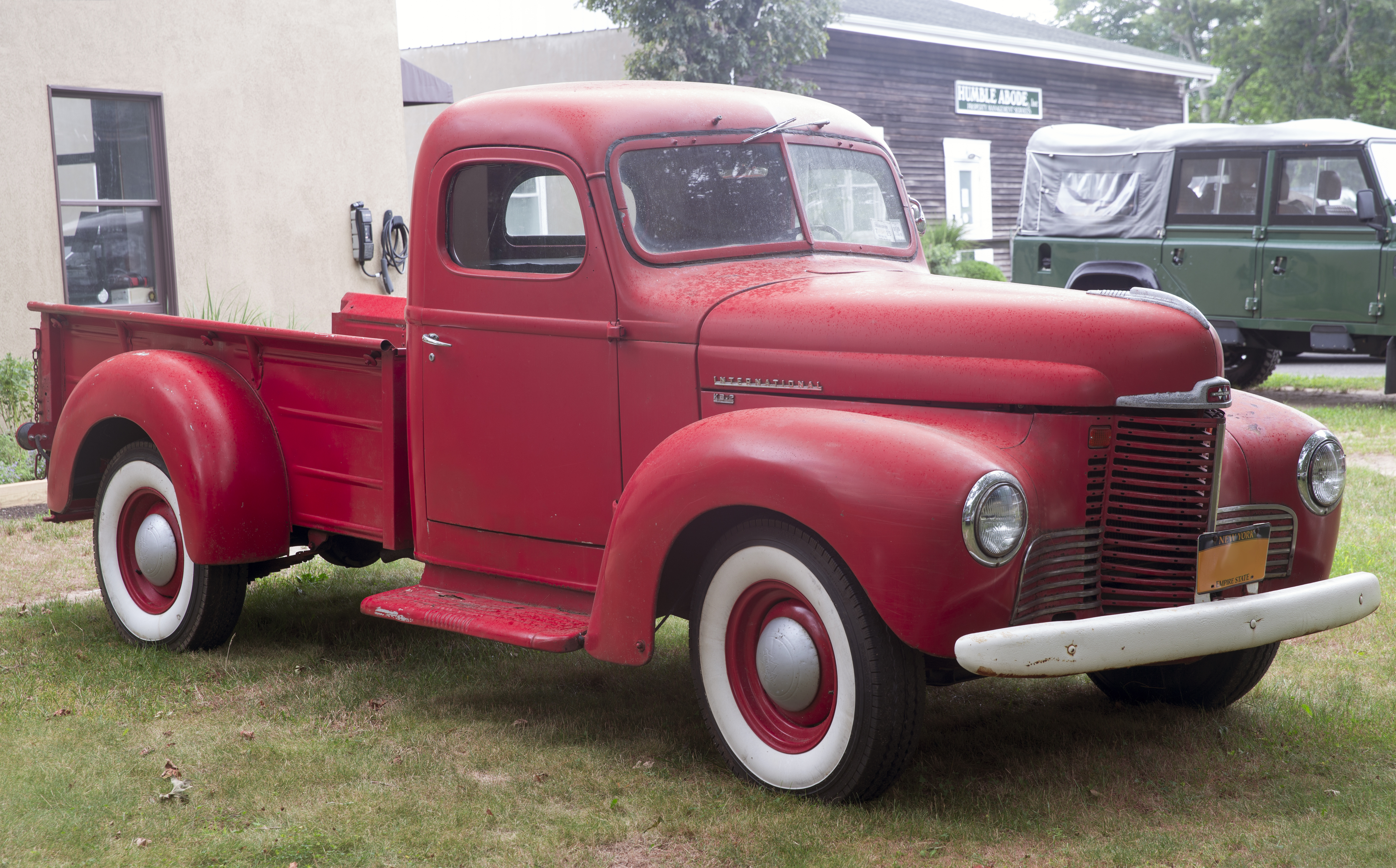

Overview
- Manufacturer: International Harvester
- Production: 1940–1949

Body and chassis
- Class: Full-size pickup truck

Chronology
- Predecessor: International D2
- Successor: International L series

The International K and KB series are trucks that were produced by International Harvester, the first being the K introduced in mid 1940. In total there were 42 models, 142 different wheelbase lengths and load ratings ranging from 1/2 ton to 90,000 lbs. They are best known for their durability, prewar design in a postwar era, and low price. The follow up to the K, the KB, was introduced in 1947, with the characteristic difference being a widened lower grille appearing like "wings". Between 1947 and 1949 122,000 KB-1 and KB-2 trucks were sold. The KB series was subsequently replaced by the L series.

== K series ==
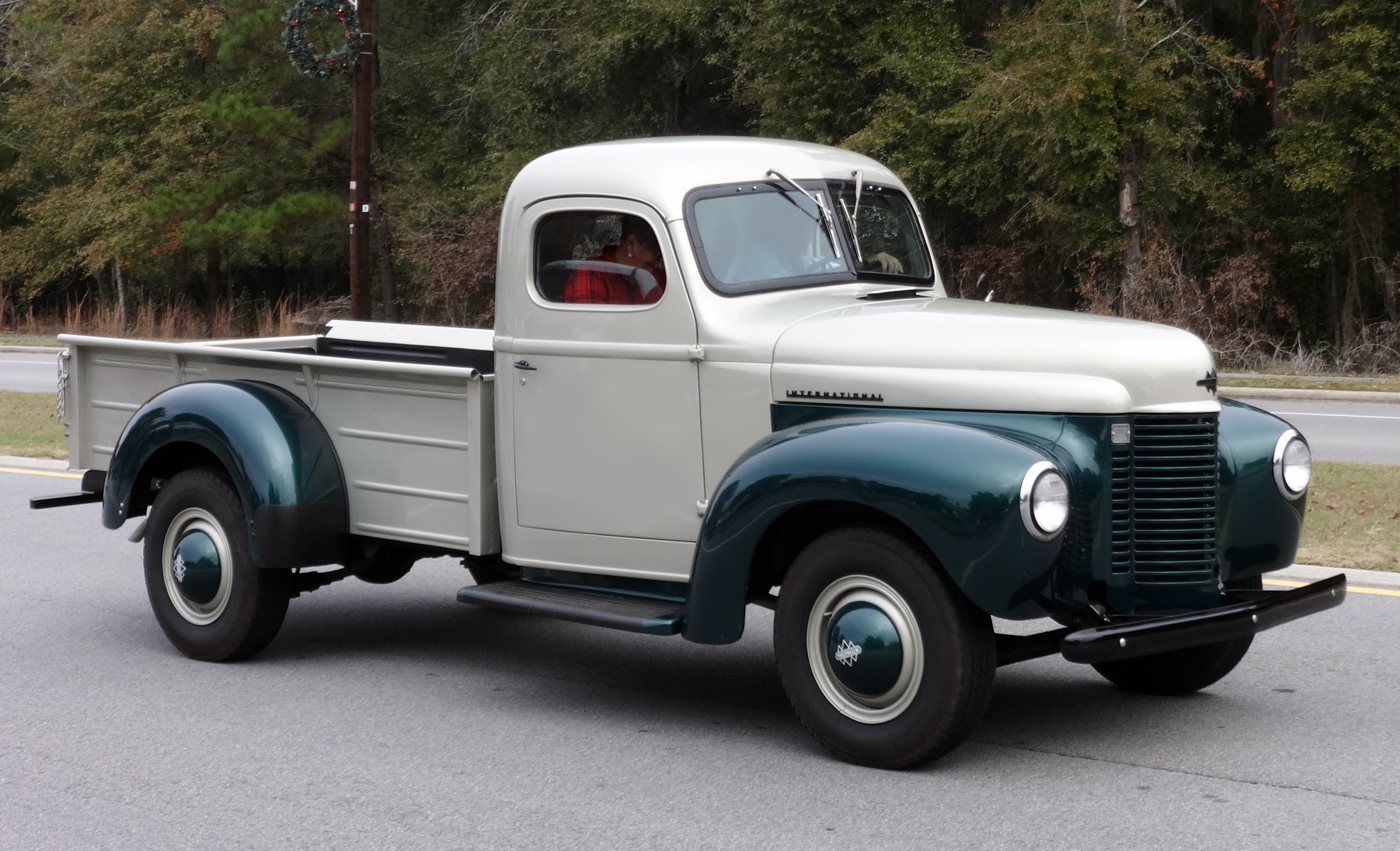
А wartime K-3 truck, with almost no brightwork at all

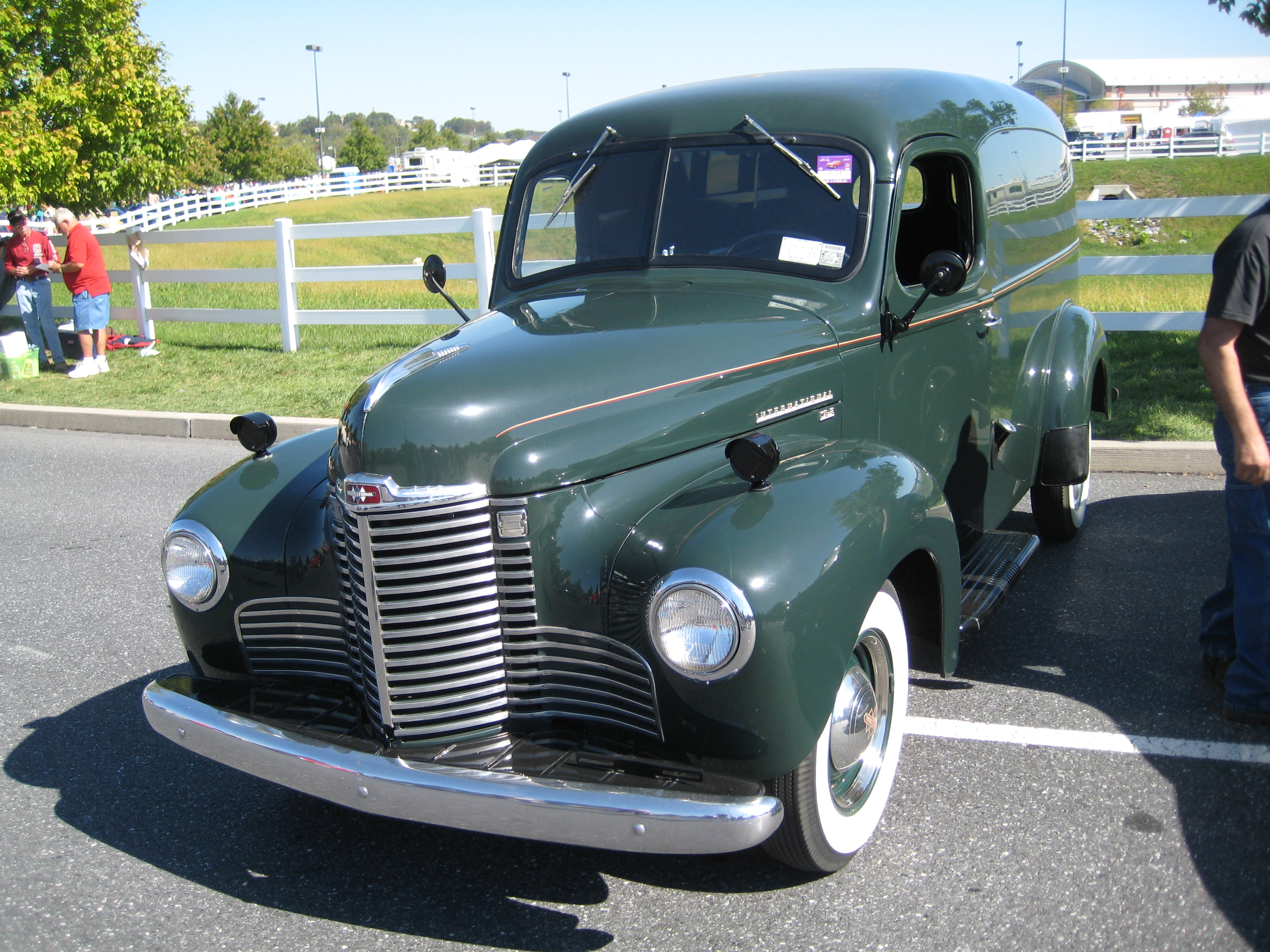
International K series panel van

=== Models ===
The K models progress from 1 to 14 based upon the load capacity (K1 = half ton, K2 = 3/4 ton, K3 = 1 ton, etc.).

There are no K-9 or K-13 model trucks.

==== Light duty ====
Few differences exist between K-1 and K-2 models as they share most of their mechanical and chassis components. The rear axles in these two models are supported by a single roller bearing. Their differences in load rating are due to the K-2's stronger suspension.

The K-3 has a heavier frame, larger brakes, and rear axles supported by two roller bearings on a free floating rear end. The heavier duty K-4 has artillery-style wheels.

==== Heavy duty ====
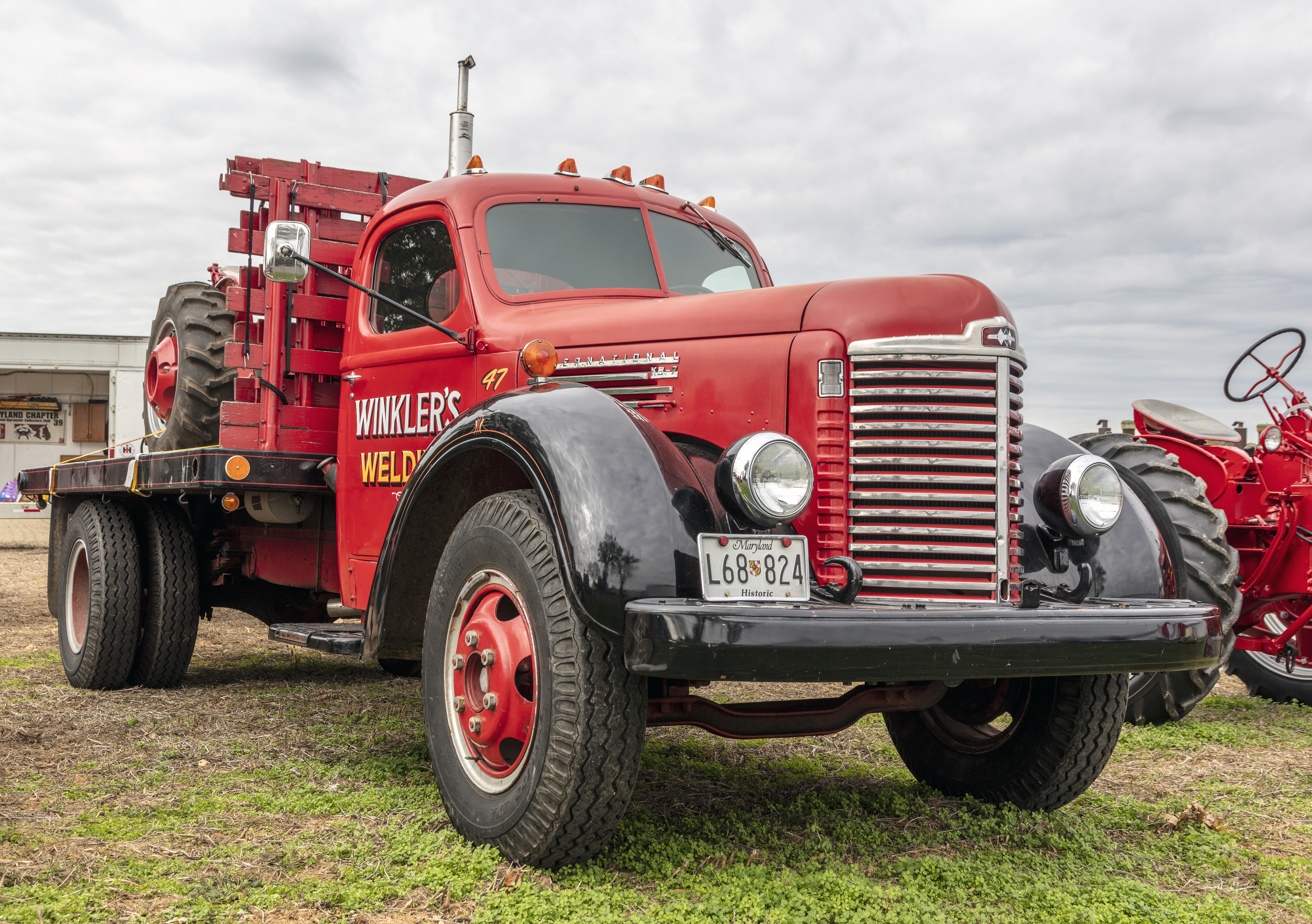
International KB-7 truck

The heavy duty K6 and larger use a center hinged butterfly hood rather than the rear hinged hood of the smaller trucks.

K6 and K7 share the same hood, fenders, and grille and use the smaller Blue Diamond engines.

K8 to K11 have a larger hood, fenders, and grille with fewer, but wider, grille bars. They use the larger FAB, Red, or RD series engines depending upon model year.

K12 has a longer hood to accommodate the larger Continental engine. They can either have the rounded nose common to the KB8 and larger or a flat nose grille.

K14 has flat top fenders rather than the rounded top of the smaller sizes.

=== Styling ===
The style of the truck involved headlamps that were integrated into the fenders. The hood opens alligator style. Heavy duty models (K6 and above) carried over the D-series cab and high crowned fenders.

== KB series ==
The lightly modernized KB-series was presented for the 1947 model year. For the KB-1 thru KB-5, chrome "wings" were added on the sides of the grille, a wrap-around chrome piece on the front hood, a hood ornament and chrome lettering indicating the model designation below the International nameplate on each side of the hood. For the KB-6 and larger trucks, the only external changes were that the Triple Diamond badge was moved to the top of the grille chrome-work, and the model designations were added to the hood-side chrome trim.
