= One Line =

One Line may refer to:

- "One Line", a track of the PJ Harvey album Stories from the City, Stories from the Sea
- One Line (film), a 2017 South Korean film

== See also ==
- First Line (disambiguation)
- Line 1 (disambiguation) including "1 Line"
- 1 Train (disambiguation)
