= 1 Train =

1 Train may refer to:

- 1 (New York City Subway service)
- "1 Train" (song), by ASAP Rocky

== See also ==
- One Line (disambiguation)
- Line 1 (disambiguation)
- I Train (disambiguation)
