= KMB Route 1 =

Bus route operated in Kowloon, Hong Kong

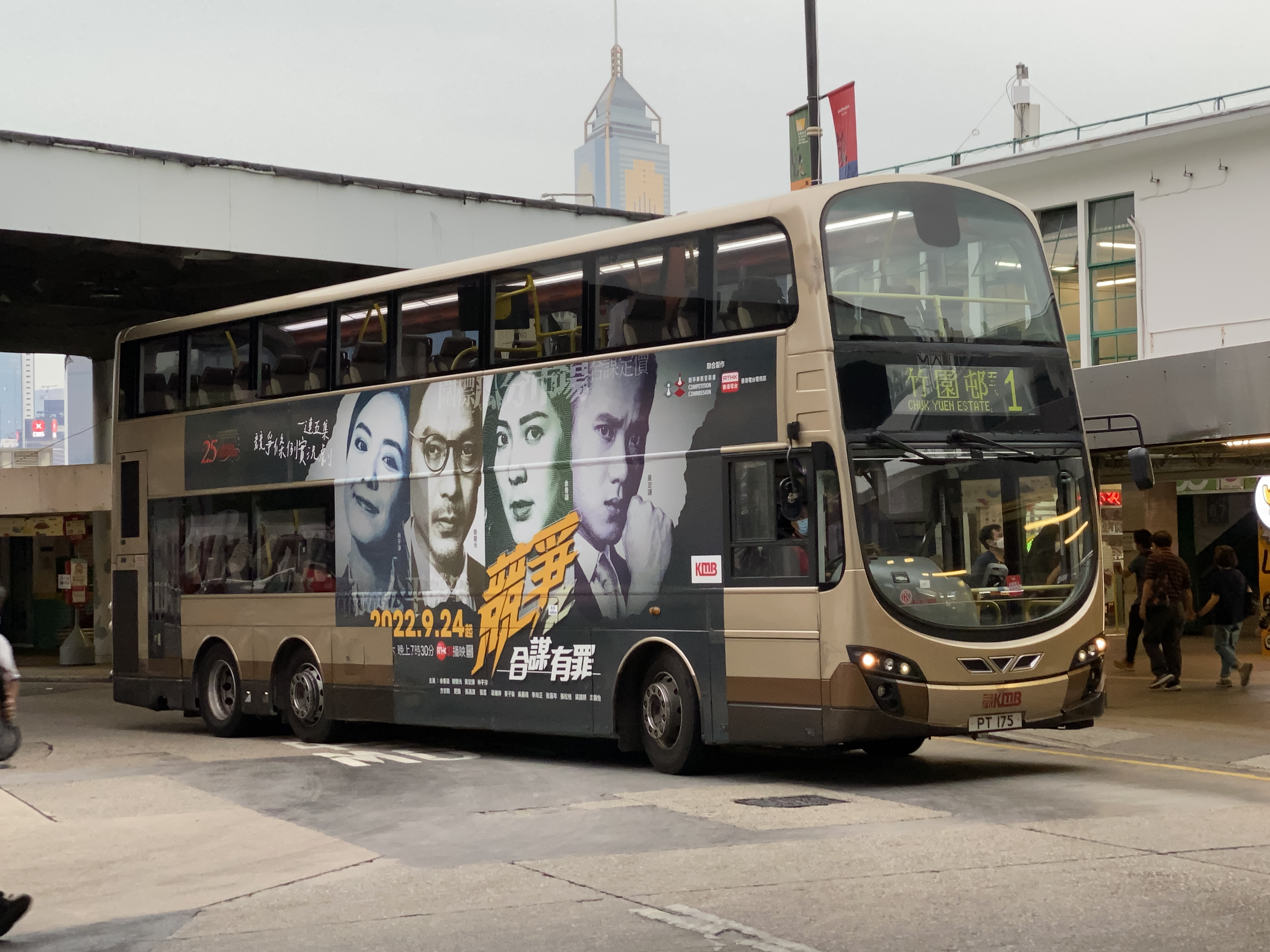

Overview
- Operator: Kowloon Motor Bus (KMB)
- Garage: Kowloon Bay depot
- Vehicle: Volvo B9TL 12m (AVBWU, AVG); Alexander Dennis Enviro500 12 m (ATENU); BYD B12A 12 m (BEB)

Route
- Start: Chuk Yuen Estate
- Via: Lok Fu, Kowloon City, Kowloon Tong, Mong Kok, Yau Ma Tei
- End: Tsim Sha Tsui Ferry Pier
- Length: 9.2 km
- Competition: Many KMB routes such as 1A, 3C and 7 MTR

Service
- Level: 0523 - 2340
- Alt. level: 0630 - 0045
- Frequency: Mondays to Fridays: 7-15 mins. Saturdays, Sundays and public holidays: 9-20 mins.
- Journey time: 65 mins.

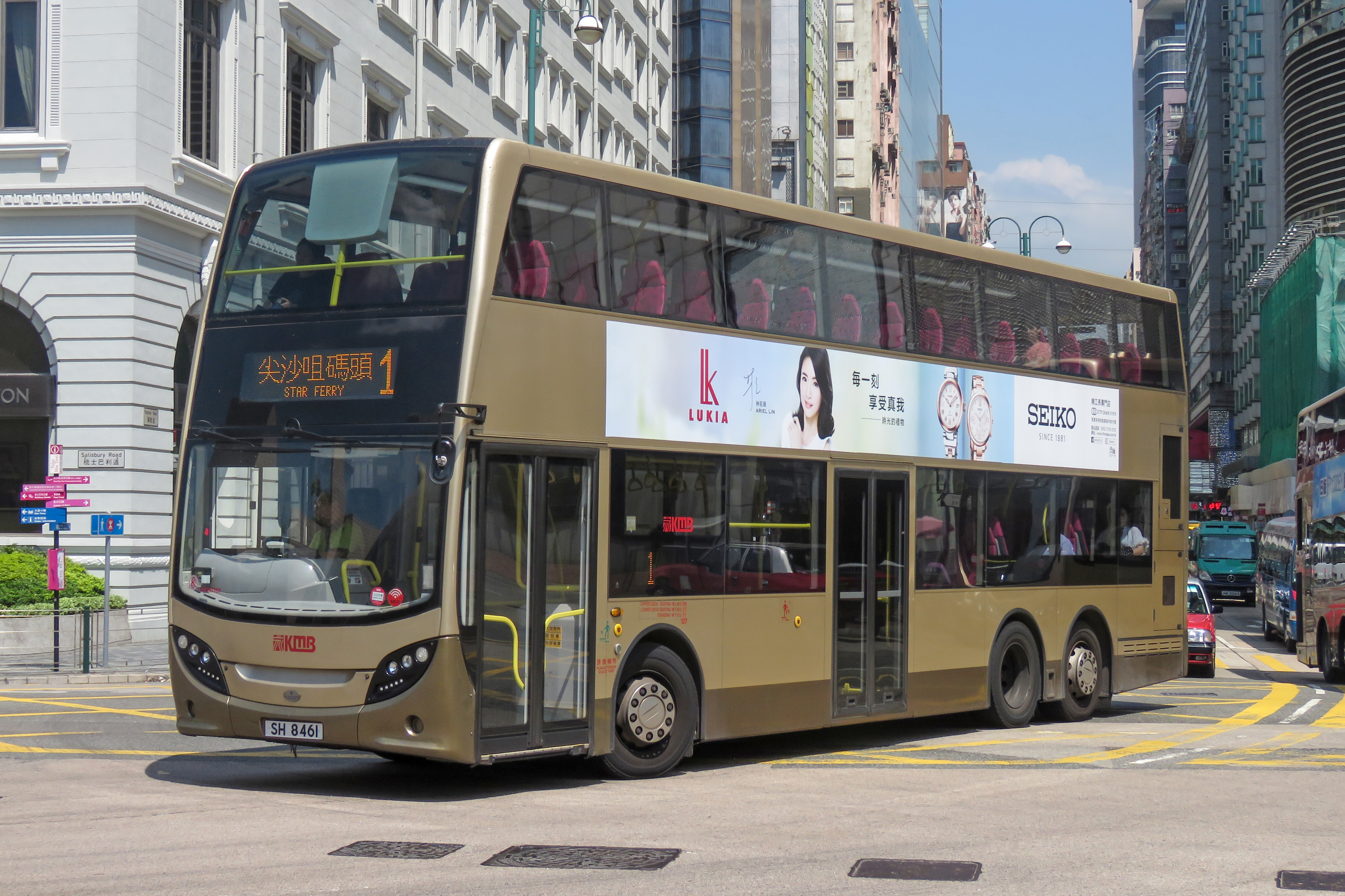
An Alexander Dennis Enviro500 MMC on route 1 at Tsim Sha Tsui in 2018

KMB Route 1 is a bus route operated in Kowloon, Hong Kong. It is run by Kowloon Motor Bus and connects the Star Ferry Pier and Chuk Yuen Estate in Wong Tai Sin. The bus runs via Tsim Sha Tsui, Yau Ma Tei, Mong Kok, Kowloon City and Lok Fu.

As the bus route goes through the centre of Kowloon Peninsula, buses on this route are usually full, with the route serving as one of Kowloon's major bus routes.

== Major milestones in the service history ==
- The route was started in the 1920s, then known as Route 6. The route served between Tsim Sha Tsui and Kowloon City. Fares were divided into first and second classes at that time.
- The route ceased operation during the Battle of Hong Kong in December 1941 and resumed January 10, 1942 as the Japanese military government in Hong Kong reorganized the bus services.
- The route was renumbered Route 1 in October, 1942.
- August 12, 1943, the route was shortened to serve between Tsim Sha Tsui and Waterloo Road due to shortage of fuel.
- During the final days of Japanese occupation, this route was the only bus route remaining in service in Kowloon.
- In mid-February, 1946 KMB resumed the route.
- The first four double decker buses in Hong Kong were allocated to this route on April 17, 1949, as the population in Yau Ma Tei, Mong Kok and Kowloon City increased rapidly.
- The route was one of only few routes still in service in Kowloon during the 1967 riots.
- In 1972 the route was extended to Wang Tau Hom to serve newly developed areas.
- In 1976 the route was extended to Lok Fu to serve newly developed areas.
- In 1984 the route was further extended to Chuk Yuen Estate, its current terminus.

== Fleet ==
Single decker buses were used before World War II, and double deckers joined the route from 1949. Air conditioned services started from 3 August 1992, and since 2014, more Volvo B9TL buses have been deployed in the route. However, the B9TLs have been replaced by 15 Enviro500 MMCs operating this route.

== Route information ==
- Journey distance: 9.1 km
- Journey time: 54 mins
- Goes past Tsim Sha Tsui, Yau Ma Tei, Mong Kok, Lok Fu, Wang Tau Hom and Wong Tai Sin.
- Goes past Yau Tsim Mong District, Kowloon City District and Wong Tai Sin District.
- Goes past major roads like Nathan Road, Prince Edward Road West and Junction Road, Hong Kong.

== Bus stops ==
From Chuk Un Estate to Star Ferry:

- There are 25 stops:
1. Chuk Yuen Estate Bus Terminus
2. Baptist Rainbow Primary School
3. Ma Chai Hang Recreation Park
4. Morse Park
5. Morse Park Sports Centre
6. Wai Tung House
7. Ying Tung House
8. Kowloon Walled City Park
9. Carpenter Road
10. Prince Edward Road West
11. La Salle Road
12. Earl Street
13. Knight Street
14. Diocesan Boys’ School
15. Heep Woh Primary School
16. Prince Edward Station
17. Nelson Street
18. Soy Street
19. Wing Sing Lane
20. Cheong Lok Street
21. Tak Shing Street
22. Cameron Road
23. Middle Road
24. Hong Kong Cultural Centre
25. Star Ferry Bus Terminus

From Star Ferry to Chuk Un Estate

- There are 25 stops:
1. Star Ferry Bus Terminus
2. Middle Road
3. Kimberley Road
4. Bowring Street
5. Kowloon Central Post Office
6. Man Ming Lane
7. Changsha Street
8. Nelson Street
9. Hong Kong and Kowloon Chiu Chow School
10. Queen Elizabeth School
11. Prince Edward Station
12. Fa Hui Park
13. Caritas Dormitory, Prince Edward
14. La Salle Primary School
15. St. Teresa's Hospital
16. Nga Tsin Wai Road
17. Dumbarton Road
18. Kowloon Walled City Park
19. Mei Tung House
20. Morse Park Open-Air Theatre
21. Hong Keung Court
22. Wang Yip House
23. Tin Wang Court
24. Baptist Rainbow Primary School
25. Chuk Un Estate Bus Terminus

== See also ==
- List of bus routes in Hong Kong
