= International L series =

Type of truck

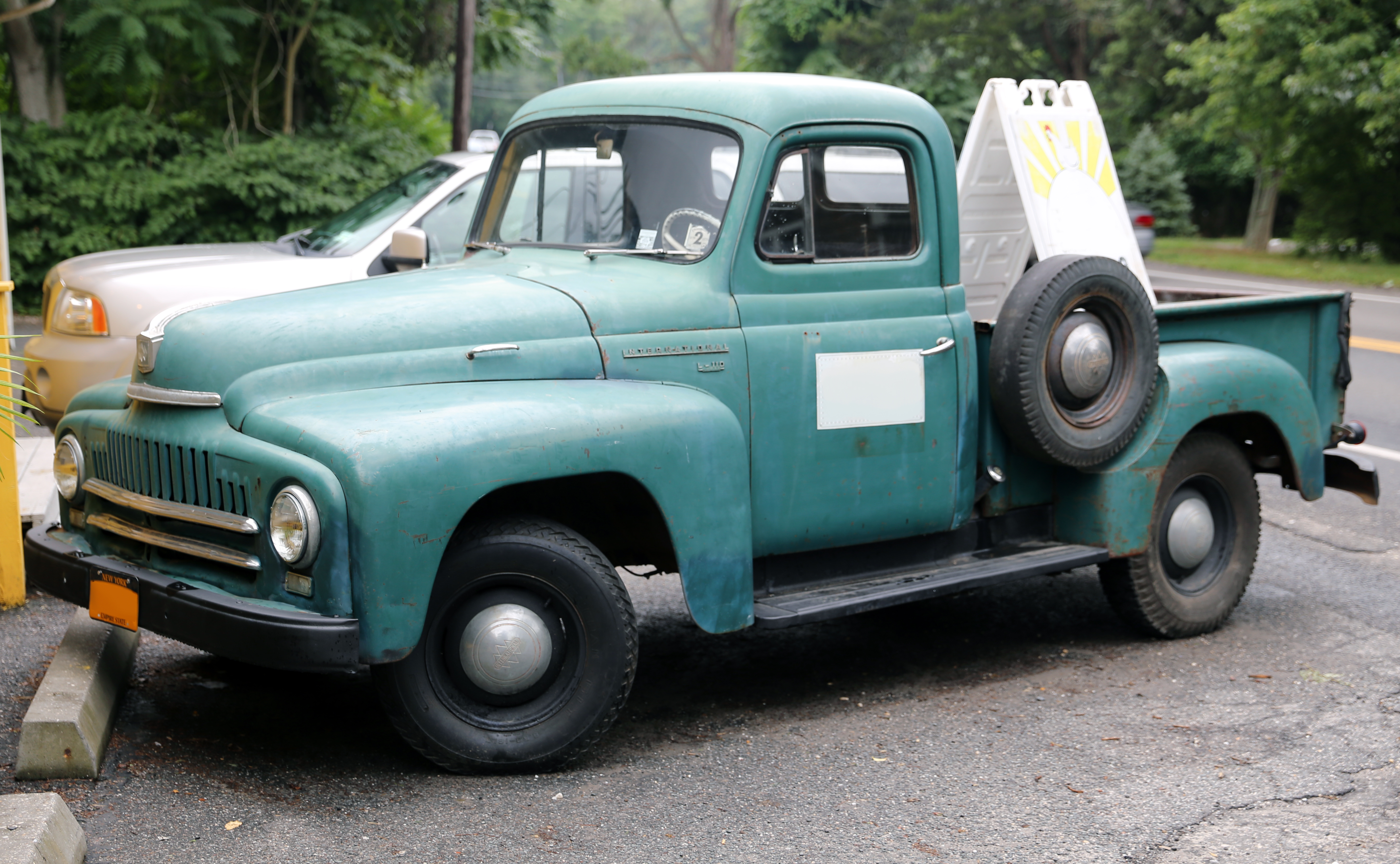

Overview
- Manufacturer: International Harvester
- Production: 1949–1952

Body and chassis
- Layout: FR layout

Powertrain
- Engine: 220 cu in (3.6 L) Silver Diamond I6; 240 cu in (3.9 L) Silver Diamond I6; 269 cu in (4.4 L) Super Blue Diamond I6
- Transmission: 3-speed manual Model T9 4-speed HD manual (non-synchro); 4-speed Model T98 manual

Dimensions
- Wheelbase: 115 in (2,921 mm) or 127 in (3,226 mm) (L-110/L1-111); 127 in (3,226 mm) (L-112); 134 in (3,404 mm) (L-130)

Chronology
- Predecessor: International KB series
- Successor: International R series

The International L series was introduced by International Harvester in fall 1949 as the replacement for the KB series and were available as everything from light pickup trucks and delivery vehicles to full-size tractor-trailers. Electric wipers, a radio, and a clock were optional. International would continue to produce the line until 1953 when it was replaced by the R series.

== Development ==
Heavier versions such as the L-150 to L-180 models had taller bodywork to accommodate a bigger engine, beefier chassis, and larger wheels. To hide this in appearance, they receive an extra, full-width chrome grille bar underneath the other two and the headlights. The L-185-L210 models had a longer, narrower hood and taller grille than all the smaller models, surrounded by oversized fenders. These trucks were a different look although they have the same cab as the smaller trucks. Of the pickup-type bodies, these were available in 6 ft and 8 ft lengths. On L-130 models, a 9-1/2 ft long pickup bed of same design was available and accommodated dual rear wheels. Two different styles of IH factory flatbeds with removable sides were also available for sizes up to L-180. Other bodies were designed around the basic truck chassis of each series, such as the "Metro" LM120-122 and LM150-152, the "bread trucks" used by bakeries or laundries for example. They hardly resembled the L-Line. The LB-140 Milk Delivery truck was also an oddity with its looks and revolutionary semi-automatic clutch, however it had the L-line face. The LC160-162 and LC180-182 cab-over trucks, or cab-forwards" as they were then called, were another oddity of their own.

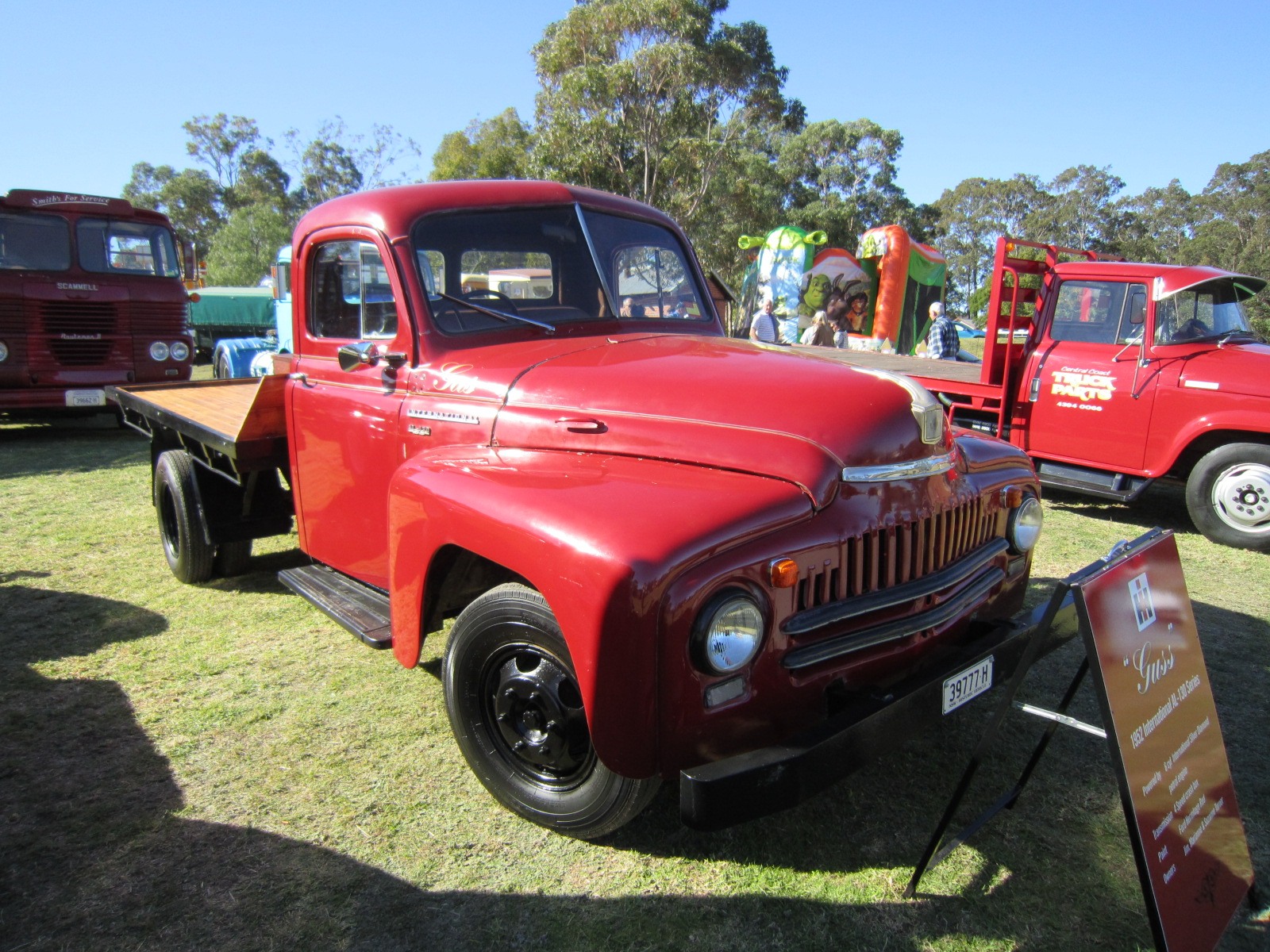
1952 International AL-130 (Australia)

The L series was also built in Australia, where it was called the AL series.

== The first of the marketing names ==
- The "Schoolmaster" : L-153, L-163, L-173, L-183, and L-193. The L-193 bus had the same nose style as the L190-up trucks.
- The "Loadstar" : First introduced in the L-Line, as the L-164, L-174, L-184, L-194, and L-204. It was the model with the heaviest capacity within each series. The "4's" were the only ones to have the "Loadstar" decal on the dash.
- The "Roadliner" : First introduced in the L-Line, assigned to the L-165, L-175, L-185, L-195, and L-205. The Roadliner was IH's specific "premier" tractor truck model "loaded" with comforts and work-ready, which means not all tractors are the "5's." It was common to see basic L-190 tractors or L-183 tractors, for example. The customer typically ordered the cab & chassis package they wanted and had a body or 5th-wheel installed elsewhere.

== Mining, construction, and industrial ==
To further bolster its presence alongside IH's own massive line of heavy construction equipment and meet highway weight limits, the LF-170, LF-190, and LF-210 series was built. These were tandem-axle 6x4 drivetrain trucks for hauling heavier loads than their 4x2 counterparts. For example, the GVW of a L-194 is 25,500 vs the 38,000 of the LF-194.

== Engines ==
The lighter-duty versions were equipped with the all-new OHV "Silver Diamond" engines in two different sizes (220cid & 240cid), while the medium-duty versions retained the older 269 ci "Blue Diamond", also an OHV engine, although it was now called the "Super Blue Diamond" after some detail improvements. The BD-269 has the same peak power as the smallest, but offers more torque, at 222 lb⋅ft (301 N⋅m) versus 192 lb⋅ft (260 N⋅m) for the Silver Diamond 240.

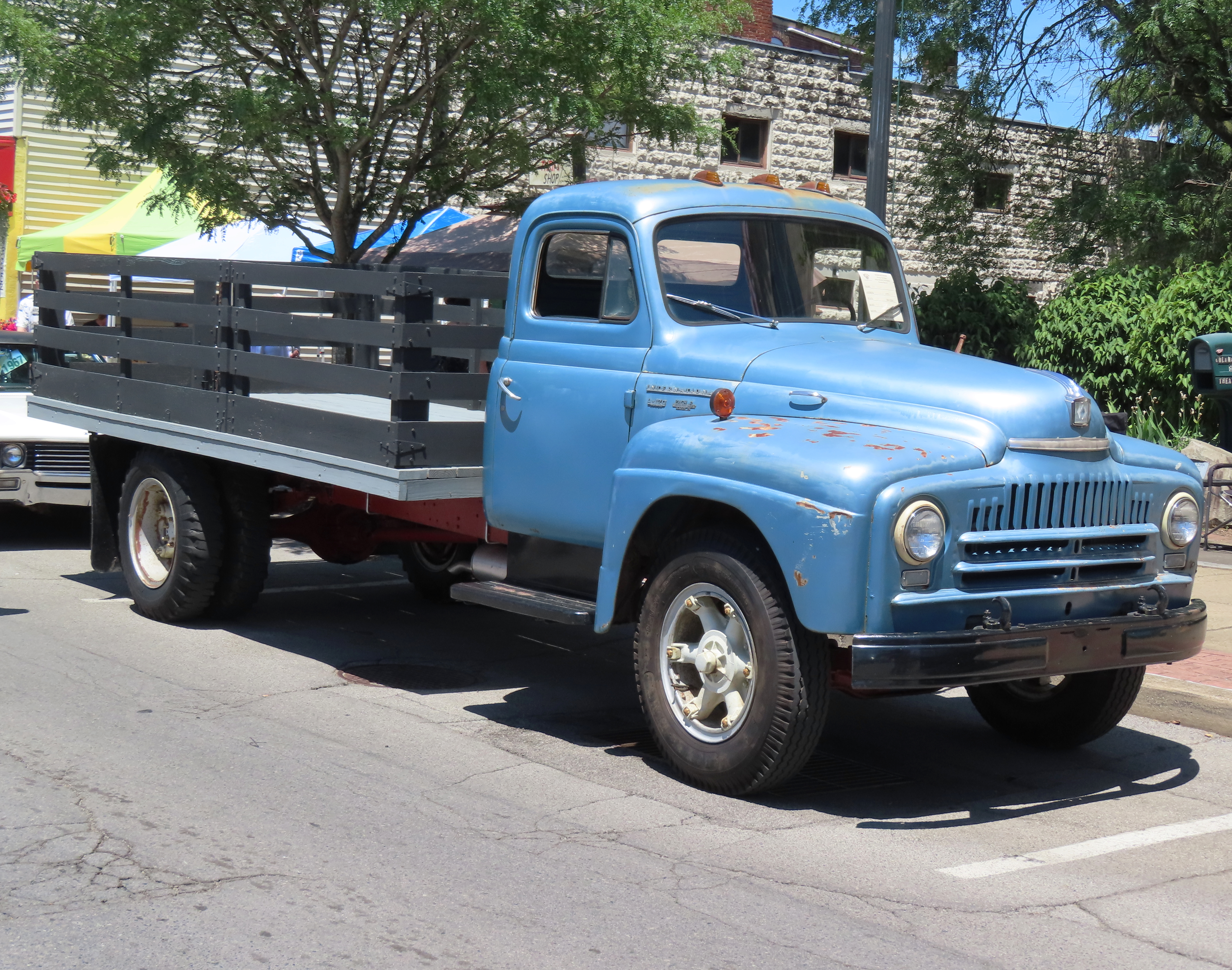
Medium-duty L-170

L-series specs (1949)

- Engine
  - Silver Diamond 220 OHV inline-six, 220.5 cu in (3,613 cc) and 100 hp (75 kW) (L-110/120/130/150)
  - Silver Diamond 240 OHV inline-six, 240.3 cu in (3,938 cc) and 108 hp (81 kW) (LB-140/L150/160)
  - Super Blue Diamond BD-269 OHV inline-six, 269.1 cu in (4,410 cc) and 100 hp (75 kW) (L-170/180)
  - Red Diamond 372 OHV inline-six (L-190)
  - Red Diamond 406 OHV inline-six (L-200/option in L-190)
  - Red Diamond 450 OHV inline-six (L-210/option in L-200)
- Transmission
  - Three speeds forward, one reverse, synchromesh column mounted
  - Four speeds forward, one reverse, non-synchromesh floor mounted, Model T9
  - Four speeds forward, one reverse, synchromesh floor mounted, model T98 (option in L120-L170 after 5/50)
  - Five speeds forward, one reverse, non-synchromesh floor mounted (L180 series, option in L160-L170)
  - Overdrive Five speeds forward, one reverse, non-synchromesh floor mounted (option in L160-L180 series)
  - Electric 2-speed rear axle (option in L160-up)
  - HD Five speeds forward, one reverse, synchromesh floor mounted (L190-up, overdrive optional)
  - Manual 3-speed Auxiliary transmission (option in L190-up)

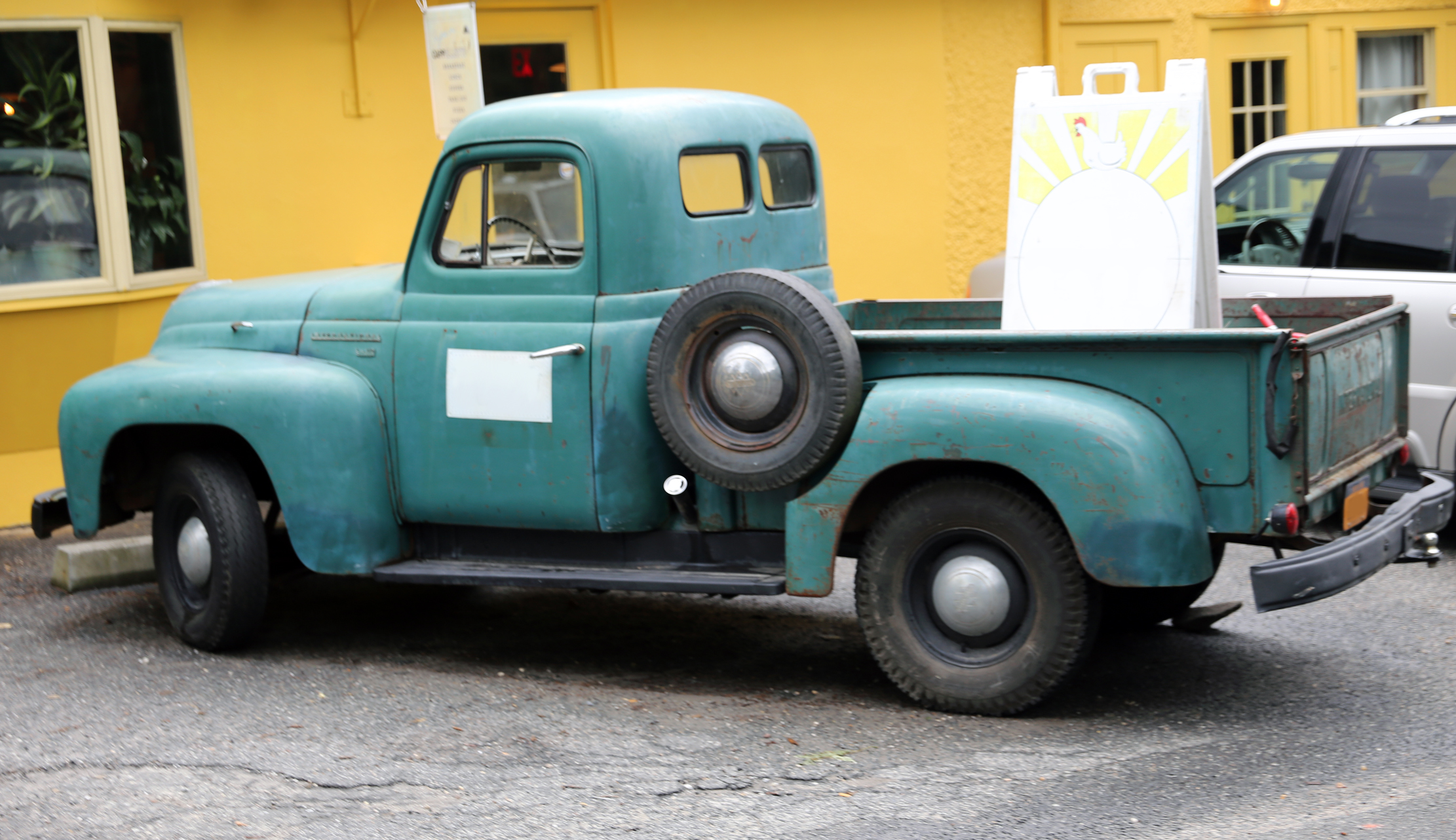
Rear view of L-110

| Model | GVWR (lbs) | Cargo Capacity (lbs) |
|---|---|---|
| L-110 | 4,200 | 1,600 |
| L-111 | 4,500 | 1,900 |
| L-112 | 4,800 | 2,200 |
| L-120 | 5,200 | 2,400 |
| L-121 | 5,700 | 2,800 |
| L-122 | 6,200 | 3,200 |
| L-130 | 6,800 | 3,700 |
| L-131 | Early: 7,400 Late: 7,700 | Early: 4,200 Late: 4,500 |
| L-132 | Early: 8,000 Late: 8,600 | Early: 4,700 Late: 5,300 |
| LB-140 | 9,000 | |
| L-150 | 9,000 | |
| L-151 | 10,750 | |
| L-152 | 12,500 | |
| L-160 | 14,000 | |
| L-161 | 15,000 | |
| L-162 | 16,000 | |
| L-164 | 16,500 | 8,000 |
| L-165 | 16,000 / 29,000 w/semitrailer | depends on trailer weight |
| L-170 | 16,000 | |
| LF-170 6x4 | 22,000 | |
| L-171 | 17,000 | |
| LF-171 6x4 | 24,000 | |
| L-172 | 18,000 | |
| LF-172 6x4 | 26,000 | |
| L-174 | 18,500 | 10,000 |
| LF-174 6x4 | 27,000 | |
| L-175 | 18,000 / 33,000 w/semitrailer | depends on trailer weight |
| L-180 | 17,000 | |
| L-181 | 19,000 | |
| L-182 | 21,000 | |
| L-184 | 21,500 | 13,000 |
| L-185 | 21,000 / 42,000 w/semitrailer | depends on trailer weight |
| L-190 | 21,000 | |
| LF-190 6x4 | 30,000 | |
| L-191 | 23,000 | |
| LF-191 6x4 | 32,500 | |
| L-192 | 25,000 | |
| LF-192 6x4 | 35,000 | |
| L-194 | 25,500 | |
| LF-194 6x4 | 38,000 | |
| L-195 | 24,000 / 48,000 w/semitrailer | depends on trailer weight |
| LF-195 6x4 | 35,000 / 55,000 w/semitrailer | depends on trailer weight |
| L-200 | 24,000 | |
| L-201 | 27,000 | |
| L-202 | 29,000 | |
| L-204 | 29,500 | |
| L-205 | 28,000 / 52,000 w/semitrailer | depends on trailer weight |
| L-210 | 30,000 | |
| LF-210 6x4 | 37,000 | |
| L-211 | 34,000 | |
| LF-211 6x4 | 41,000 | |
| L-212 | 38,000 | |
| LF-212 6x4 | 45,000 | |

== See also ==
- List of International Harvester vehicles
