= Sony Vaio FE series =

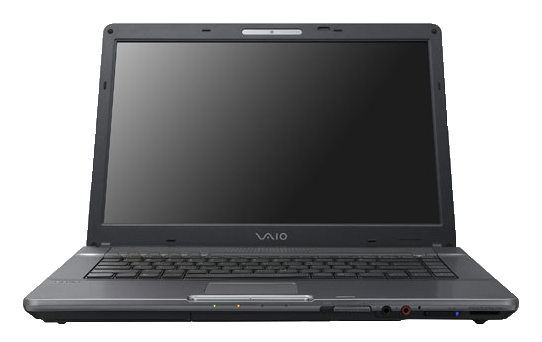
The Current FE41

Sony Vaio FE series started in 2006 with the FE11 and ends in 2007 with the FE41.

The FE series was designed as an entertainment notebook that is suitably portable. The FE series includes FE11, FE21, FE28, FE31, FE41 and FE48 models. They possess various types of a 15.4-inch 1280×800 X-Black screen, either with one or two backlight lamps. It is not widely known that the type and quality of the LCD matrix has also widely varied. The FE11 (and supposedly FE21) series has a rare type of 72% TrueColor screen, whose colour reproduction quality makes it suitable for graphics applications. FE31 series possesses a low quality screen whose colour reproduction is of the market average level at best. Some improvements have been made to the FE41 series screens, which have become better but do not reach the FE11 screen quality.

It was superseded by the Sony VAIO FZ series in July 2007.

FE Series Model Number	Display	Processor	Graphics	RAM	Storage	Networking	Audio	OS	Spec Level
FE11
FE11H	15.4" 1280×800 X-Black	Intel Core Duo T2300	Nvidia GeForce Go 7400 (256 MB TurboCache)	1 GB (1 GiB) @ 533 MHz (DDR2)	100 GB SATA HDD			Windows XP Media Centre Edition	Entry Level
FE11M	15.4" 1280×800 X-Black	Intel Core Duo T2300	Nvidia GeForce Go 7400 (256 MB TurboCache)	1 GB (1 GiB) @ 533 MHz (DDR2)	100 GB SATA HDD			Windows XP Media Centre Edition	Mid-range
FE11S	15.4" 1280×800 X-Black	Intel Core Duo T2400	Nvidia GeForce Go 7400 (256 MB TurboCache)	1 GB (1 GiB) @ 533 MHz (DDR2)	160 GB			Windows XP Media Centre Edition	High Spec
FE21
FE21B		Intel Core Duo T2300	Nvidia GeForce Go 7400 (256 MB TurboCache)	1 GB @ 533 MHz (DDR2)	80 GB			Windows XP Media Centre Edition	Basic Level
FE21H		Intel Core Duo T2300	Nvidia GeForce Go 7400 (256 MB TurboCache)	1 GB @ 533 MHz (DDR2)	100 GB			Windows XP Media Centre Edition	Entry Level
FE21M		Intel Core Duo T2300	Nvidia GeForce Go 7600 (128 MB)	1 GB @ 533 MHz (DDR2)	160 GB			Windows XP Media Centre Edition	Mid-range
FE21S		Intel Core Duo T2400	Nvidia GeForce Go 7600 (128 MB)	1 GB @ 533 MHz (DDR2)	160 GB			Windows XP Media Centre Edition	High Spec
FE31
FE31B		Intel Core 2 Duo T5500	Nvidia GeForce Go 7400 (256 MB TurboCache)	1 GB @ 533 MHz (DDR2)	80 GB			Windows XP Media Centre Edition	Basic Level
FE31H		Intel Core 2 Duo T5500	Nvidia GeForce Go 7400 (256 MB TurboCache)	1 GB @ 533 MHz (DDR2)	120 GB			Windows XP Media Centre Edition	Entry Level
FE31M		Intel Core 2 Duo T5600	Nvidia GeForce Go 7600 (128 MB)	1 GB @ 533 MHz (DDR2)	160 GB			Windows XP Media Centre Edition	Mid-range
FE31Z		Intel Core 2 Duo T5500	Nvidia GeForce Go 7600 (128 MB)	2 GB @ 533 MHz (DDR2)	200 GB			Windows XP Media Centre Edition	Full Spec
FE41
FE41E		Intel Core 2 Duo T5500	Nvidia GeForce Go 7400 (256 MB TurboCache)	1 GB @ 667 MHz (DDR2)	120 GB			Windows Vista Home Premium	Entry Level
FE41M		Intel Core 2 Duo T5500	Nvidia GeForce Go 7400 (256 MB TurboCache)	2 GB @ 667 MHz (DDR2)	120 GB			Windows Vista Home Premium	Mid-range
FE41S		Intel Core 2 Duo T5500	Nvidia GeForce Go 7600 (128 MB)	2 GB @ 667 MHz (DDR2)	160 GB			Windows Vista Home Premium	High spec
FE41Z		Intel Core 2 Duo T7200	Nvidia GeForce Go 7600 (128 MB)	2 GB @ 667 MHz (DDR2)	200 GB			Windows Vista Home Premium	Full Spec

Nearly all the FE series machines contain a VGA (640×480) webcam, wireless A/B/G, memory stick reader and later models have Bluetooth. The VGN-FE28B does not contain a webcam.
