= Samsung Galaxy Tab S series =

Flagship & high-end series of tablet computers

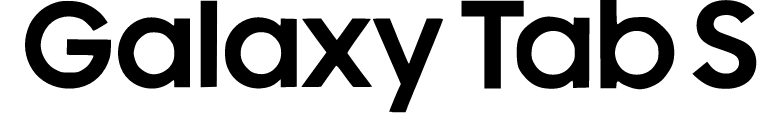

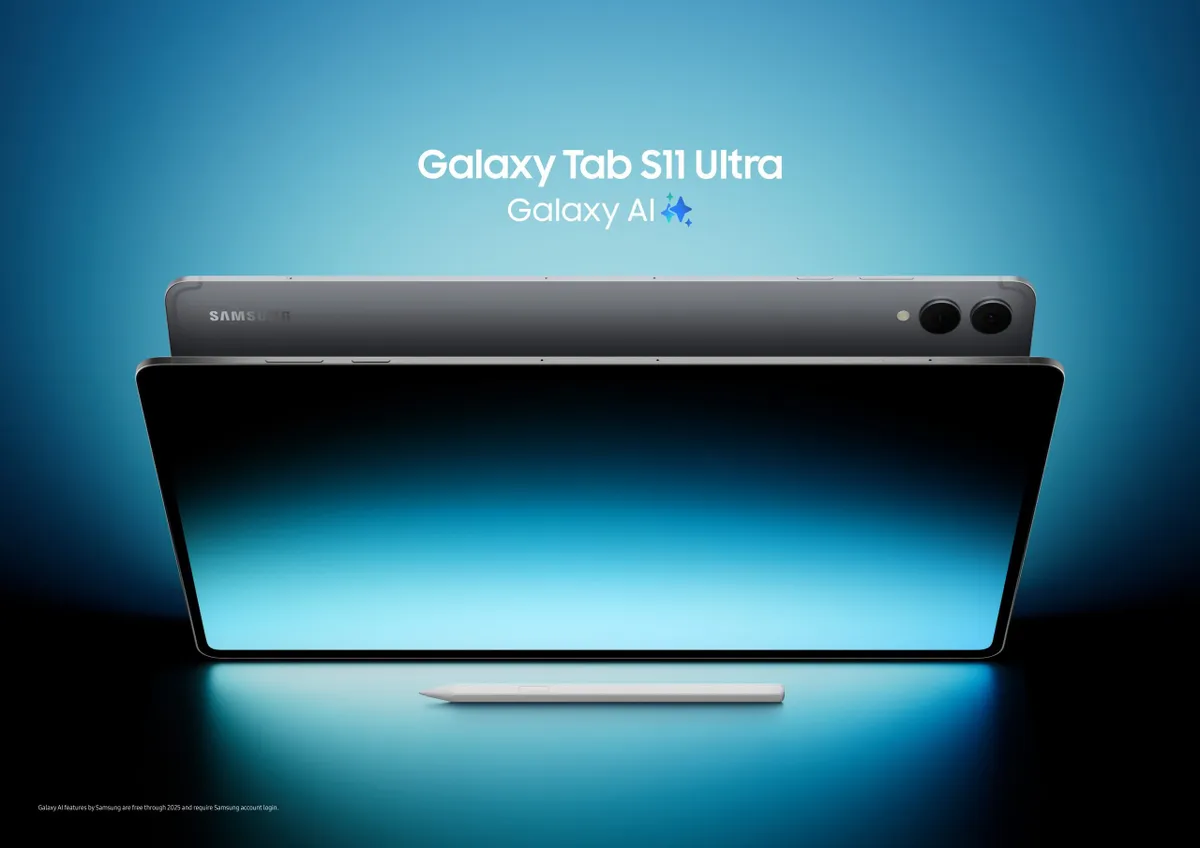
- Samsung Galaxy Tab S11 Ultra, the 2025 flagship model
- Developer: Samsung Electronics
- Product family: Samsung Galaxy
- Type: Tablet computers
- Released: June 27, 2014; 12 years ago
- Operating system: Android
- System on a chip: Samsung Exynos (2014–2015, 2020, 2023–); Qualcomm Snapdragon (2014–2023); Mediatek (2024–)
- Input: Touchscreen; Stylus (since Galaxy Tab S3)
- Predecessor: Samsung Galaxy Tab (original devices); Samsung Galaxy Note (tablet) (2012–2014)
- Related: Samsung Galaxy S series Samsung Galaxy Note; Samsung Galaxy Z series

The Samsung Galaxy Tab S series is Samsung's flagship tablet line, running the Android operating system and mirroring the Galaxy S series of smartphones. It expanded in the mid-range line with the release of the Lite and FE models.

Galaxy Tab S series release timeline
2014	Samsung Galaxy Tab S 10.5
2014	Samsung Galaxy Tab S 8.4
2015	Samsung Galaxy Tab S2 9.7
2015	Samsung Galaxy Tab S2 8.0
2016	Samsung Galaxy Tab S2 9.7 2016
2016	Samsung Galaxy Tab S2 8.0 2016
2017	Samsung Galaxy Tab S3
2018	Samsung Galaxy Tab S4
2019	Samsung Galaxy Tab S5e
2019	Samsung Galaxy Tab S6
2020	Samsung Galaxy Tab S6 Lite
2020	Samsung Galaxy Tab S7 / S7+
2021	Samsung Galaxy Tab S7 FE
2022	Samsung Galaxy Tab S8 / S8+ / S8 Ultra
2022	Samsung Galaxy Tab S6 Lite 2022
2023	Samsung Galaxy Tab S9 / S9+ / S9 Ultra
2023	Samsung Galaxy Tab S9 FE / S9 FE+
2024	Samsung Galaxy Tab S6 Lite 2024
2024	Samsung Galaxy Tab S10+ / S10 Ultra
2025	Samsung Galaxy Tab S10 FE / S10 FE+
2025	Samsung Galaxy Tab S10 Lite
2025	Samsung Galaxy Tab S11 / S11 Ultra
2026	Samsung Galaxy Tab S12+ / S12 Ultra

== History ==
The Galaxy Tab S series was first introduced in June 2014 with the release of a 8.4-inch and a 10.5-inch version. The initial release marked the return of the SuperAMOLED display on a tablet after it was last used on the Galaxy Tab 7.7 in 2012. Since then, numerous changes and newer features were introduced to the series throughout the years.

The S Pen was reintroduced for tablets with the release of the Galaxy Tab S3, a few years after the last Galaxy Note tablet released in 2014. Samsung DeX also made its way to the Tab S lineup with the release of the Galaxy Tab S4 in 2018. The Galaxy Tab S5e, released in 2019, was introduced as a more streamlined version of the Galaxy Tab S line. The lineup later expanded with the introduction of the Lite, Fan Edition (FE), and Ultra models.

The lineup unofficially served as a successor to the Galaxy Tab Pro and Galaxy Note Tab models, later incorporating their features into the Tab S lineup.

== Devices ==
=== 2022–present ===
Model		Tab S8	Tab S8+	Tab S8 Ultra	Tab S6 Lite 2022	Tab S9	Tab S9+	Tab S9 Ultra	Tab S9 FE	Tab S9 FE+	Tab S6 Lite 2024	Tab S10+	Tab S10 Ultra	Tab S10 FE	Tab S10 FE+	Tab S10 Lite	Tab S11	Tab S11 Ultra
Support status		Security only			Unsupported	Supported												
Dates	Announced	09 February 2022			14 May 2022	26 July 2023			04 October 2023		26 March 2024	26 September 2024		02 April 2025		25 August 2025	4 September 2025	
Dates	Released	March 2022	April 2022		23 May 2022	11 August 2023			16 October 2023		28 March 2024	03 October 2024		03 April 2025		25 August 2025	4 September 2025	
OS	Initial	One UI 4.0; Android 12				One UI 5.1; Android 13					One UI 6.0; Android 14	One UI 6.1; Android 14		One UI 7.0; Android 15			One UI 8.0; Android 16	
OS	Latest	One UI 8.0; Android 16			One UI 6.0; Android 14	One UI 8.5; Android 16												
Dimensions mm (in)	Height	253.8 (9.99)	285 (11.2)	326.4 (12.85)	244.5 (9.63)	254.3 (10.01)	285.4 (11.24)	326.4 (12.85)	254.3 (10.01)	285.4 (11.24)	244.5 (9.63)	285.4 (11.24)	326.4 (12.85)	254.3 (10.01)	300.6 (11.83)	254.3 (10.01)	253.8 (9.99)	326.3 (12.85)
Dimensions mm (in)	Width	165.3 (6.51)	185 (7.3)	208.6 (8.21)	154.3 (6.07)	165.8 (6.53)	185.4 (7.30)	208.6 (8.21)	165.8 (6.53)	185.4 (7.30)	154.3 (6.07)	185.4 (7.30)	208.6 (8.21)	165.8 (6.53)	194.7 (7.67)	165.8 (6.53)	165.3 (6.51)	208.5 (8.21)
Dimensions mm (in)	Depth	6.3 (0.25)	5.7 (0.22)	5.5 (0.22)	7 (0.28)	5.9 (0.23)	5.7 (0.22)	5.5 (0.22)	6.5 (0.26)		7 (0.28)	5.6 (0.22)	5.4 (0.21)	6 (0.24)		6.6 (0.26)	5.5 (0.22)	5.1 (0.20)
Weight g (lb)	WiFi only variant	503 (1.11)	567 (1.25)	726 (1.60)	465 (1.03)	498 (1.10)	581 (1.28)	732 (1.61)	523 (1.15)	627 (1.38)	465 (1.03)	571 (1.26)	718 (1.58)	497 (1.10)	664 (1.46)	524 (1.16)	469 (1.03)	692 (1.53)
Weight g (lb)	with Cellular variant	507 (1.12)	572 (1.26)	728 (1.60)	467 (1.03)	498 (1.10)	586 (1.29)	732 (1.61)	524 (1.16)	628 (1.38)	467 (1.03)	576 (1.27)	723 (1.59)	500 (1.10)	668 (1.47)	524 (1.16)	471 (1.04)	695 (1.53)
Colors																		
Display	Size	11 in (280 mm)	12.4 in (310 mm)	14.6 in (370 mm)	10.4 in (260 mm)	11 in (280 mm)	12.4 in (310 mm)	14.6 in (370 mm)	10.9 in (280 mm)	12.4 in (310 mm)	10.4 in (260 mm)	12.4 in (310 mm)	14.6 in (370 mm)	10.9 in (280 mm)	13.1 in (330 mm)	10.9 in (280 mm)	11 in (280 mm)	14.6 in (370 mm)
Display	Resolution	1600 × 2560	1752 × 2800	1848 × 2960	1200 × 2000	1600 × 2560	1752 × 2800	1848 × 2960	1440 × 2304	1600 × 2560	1200 × 2000	1752 × 2800	1848 × 2960	1440 × 2304	1800 × 2880	1320 × 2112	1600 × 2560	1848 × 2960
Display	Aspect Ratio	16:10			5:3	16:10					5:3	16:10						
Display	Refresh Rate	120 Hz			60 Hz	120 Hz			90 Hz		60 Hz	120 Hz		90 Hz			120 Hz	
Display	Type	TFT LCD	Super AMOLED		TFT LCD	Super AMOLED			IPS LCD		TFT LCD	Super AMOLED		IPS LCD		TFT LCD	Super AMOLED	
Connectivity	Wi-Fi	Wi-Fi 6e			Wi-Fi 5	Wi-Fi 6e			Wi-Fi 6		Wi-Fi 5	Wi-Fi 6e	Wi-Fi 7	Wi-Fi 6e		Wi-Fi 6	Wi-Fi 6e	Wi-Fi 7
Connectivity	Cellular	5G			LTE	5G					LTE	5G						
Connectivity	Bluetooth	5.2			5.0	5.3											5.4	
Connectivity	Positioning	GPS, GLONASS, BDS, GALILEO							Adds; QZSS									
Connectivity	MicroSD	YES																
Connectivity	3.5 mm headphone jack	No			Yes	No					Yes	No						
Connectivity	USB	USB Type-C 3.2			USB Type-C 2.0	USB Type-C 3.2			USB Type-C 2.0			USB Type-C 3.2		USB Type-C 2.0			USB Type-C 3.2	
Rear camera(s)	Main	13 MP			8 MP	13 MP			8 MP			13 MP		13 MP		8 MP	13 MP	
Rear camera(s)	Ultrawide	6 MP			—N/a		8 MP		—N/a	8 MP	—N/a	8 MP		—N/a				8 MP
Front camera(s)	Main	—N/a		12 MP	5 MP	—N/a		12 MP	—N/a		5 MP	—N/a	12 MP	—N/a		5 MP	—N/a	
Front camera(s)	Ultrawide	12 MP			—N/a	12 MP					—N/a	12 MP				—N/a	12 MP	
RAM		8 GB; 12 GB	8 GB; 12 GB; 16 GB		4 GB	8 GB; 12 GB	12 GB; 16 GB		6 GB; 8 GB	6 GB; 8 GB; 12 GB	4 GB	12 GB	12 GB; 16 GB	8 GB; 12 GB		6 GB; 8 GB	12 GB	12 GB; 16 GB
Storage		128 GB; 256 GB	128 GB; 256 GB; 512 GB		64 GB; 128 GB	128 GB; 256 GB	256 GB; 512 GB	256 GB; 512 GB; 1 TB	128 GB; 256 GB		64 GB; 128 GB	256 GB; 512 GB	256 GB; 512 GB; 1 TB	128 GB; 256 GB		128 GB; 256 GB	128 GB; 256 GB; 512 GB	256 GB; 512 GB; 1 TB
Processor		Qualcomm; Snapdragon 8 Gen 1			Qualcomm; Snapdragon 720G; Qualcomm; Snapdragon 732G	Qualcomm; Snapdragon 8 Gen 2			Samsung; Exynos 1380		Samsung; Exynos 1280	MediaTek; Dimensity 9300+		Samsung; Exynos 1580		Samsung; Exynos 1380	MediaTek; Dimensity 9400+	
Battery	Capacity (mAh)	8000	10090	11200	7040	8400	10090	11200	8000	10090	7040	10090	11200	8000	10090	8000	8400	11600
Battery	Fast Charging	45W			15W	45W					15W	45W				25W	45W	
IP rating		No				IP68					No	IP68				IP42	IP68	

=== 2014–2021 ===
Model		Tab S 8.4	Tab S 10.5	Tab S2 8.0		Tab S2 9.7		Tab S3	Tab S4	Tab S5e	Tab S6		Tab S6 Lite (2020)	Tab S7	Tab S7+	Tab S7 FE
Support status		Unsupported														
Dates	Announced	12 June 2014		20 July 2015	12 April 2016	20 July 2015	12 April 2016	26 February 2017	1 August 2018	15 February 2019	31 July 2019	29 January 2020	02 April 2020	05 August 2020		25 May 2021
Dates	Released	July 2014		3 September 2015	12 April 2016	3 September 2015	12 April 2016	24 March 2017	10 August 2018	26 April 2019	August 2019	30 January 2020	16 May 2020	21 August 2020		18 June 2021
OS	Initial	TouchWiz; Android 4.4.2		TouchWiz; Android 5.0.2	TouchWiz; Android 6.0.1	TouchWiz; Android 5.0.2	TouchWiz; Android 6.0.1	Samsung Experience; Android 7.0	Samsung Experience; Android 8.1	One UI 1.0; Android 9.0			One UI 2.0; Android 10			One UI 3.0; Android 11
OS	Latest	TouchWiz; Android 6.0.1			Samsung Experience; Android 7.0	TouchWiz; Android 6.0.1	Samsung Experience; Android 7.0	One UI 1.0; Android 9.0	One UI 2.0; Android 10	One UI 3.0; Android 11	One UI 4.0; Android 12		One UI 5.0; Android 13	One UI 5.1; Android 13		One UI 6.0; Android 14
Dimensions mm (in)	Height	212.8 (8.38)	247.3 (9.74)	198.6 (7.82)		273.3 (10.76)		237 (9.3)	249.3 (9.81)	245 (9.6)	244.5 (9.63)			253.8 (9.99)	285 (11.2)	284.8 (11.21)
Dimensions mm (in)	Width	125.6 (4.94)	177.3 (6.98)	134.8 (5.31)		169 (6.65)		169 (6.7)	164.3 (6.47)	160 (6.3)	159.5 (6.28)		154.3 (6.07)	165.3 (6.51)	185 (7.3)	
Dimensions mm (in)	Depth	6.6 (0.26)		5.6 (0.22)				6.0 (0.24)	7.1 (0.28)	5.5 (0.22)	5.7 (0.22)		7 (0.28)	6.3 (0.25)	5.7 (0.22)	6.3 (0.25)
Weight g (lb)	WiFi only variant	294 (0.65)	465 (1.03)	265 (0.58)		389 (0.86)		429 (0.95)	482 (1.06)	400 (0.88)	420 (0.93)		467 (1.03)	498 (1.10)	575 (1.27)	608 (1.34)
Weight g (lb)	with Cellular variant	298 (0.66)	467 (1.03)	272 (0.60)		392 (0.86)		434 (0.96)	483 (1.06)	400 (0.88)	420 (0.93)		467 (1.03)	LTE: 500 (1.10); 5G: 502 (1.11)	575 (1.27)	608 (1.34)
Colors																
Display	Size	8.4 in (210 mm)	10.5 in (270 mm)	8 in (200 mm)		9.7 in (250 mm)			10.5 in (270 mm)				10.4 in (260 mm)	11 in (280 mm)	12.4 in (310 mm)	
Display	Resolution	2560 × 1600		1536 × 2048					1600 × 2560				1200 × 2000	1600 × 2560	1752 × 2800	1600 × 2560
Display	Aspect Ratio	16:10		4:3					16:10				5:3	16:10		
Display	Refresh Rate	60 Hz												120 Hz		60 Hz
Display	Type	Super AMOLED											TFT LCD		Super AMOLED	TFT LCD
Connectivity	Wi-Fi	Wi-Fi 5												Wi-Fi 6		
Connectivity	Cellular	LTE								LTE	LTE	5G	LTE	LTE/5G	5G	
Connectivity	Bluetooth	4.0		4.1				4.2	5.0							5.2
Connectivity	Positioning	GPS, GLONASS, BDS		Drops; BDS				Adds; BDS, GALILEO								
Connectivity	MicroSD	Yes														
Connectivity	3.5 mm headphone jack	Yes								No			Yes	No		
Connectivity	USB	Micro-USB 2.0						USB Type-C 3.1					USB Type-C 2.0	USB Type-C 3.2		
Rear camera(s)	Main	8 MP						13 MP					8 MP	13 MP		8 MP
Rear camera(s)	Ultrawide	—N/a									5 MP		—N/a	5 MP		—N/a
Front camera(s)	Main	2.1 MP						5 MP	8 MP				5 MP	8 MP		5 MP
Front camera(s)	Ultrawide	—N/a														
RAM		3 GB						4 GB	4 GB; 6 GB		6 GB; 8 GB		4 GB	6 GB; 8 GB		
Storage		16 GB; 32 GB		32 GB; 64 GB		16 GB; 32 GB; 64 GB		32 GB; 128 GB	64 GB; 256 GB	64 GB; 128 GB	128 GB; 256 GB		64 GB; 128 GB	128 GB; 256 GB; 512 GB		128 GB; 256 GB
Processor		Qualcomm; Snapdragon 800; Samsung; Exynos 5420 Octa		Samsung; Exynos 5433	Qualcomm; Snapdragon 652	Samsung; Exynos 5433	Qualcomm; Snapdragon 652	Qualcomm; Snapdragon 820	Qualcomm; Snapdragon 835	Qualcomm; Snapdragon 670	Qualcomm; Snapdragon 855	Qualcomm; Snapdragon 855+	Samsung; Exynos 9611	Qualcomm; Snapdragon 865+		Qualcomm; Snapdragon 750G; Qualcomm; Snapdragon 778G
Battery	Capacity (mAh)	4900	7900	4000	5870	4000	5870	6000	7300	7040				8000	10090	
Battery	Fast Charging	No						18W			15W			45W		
IP rating		No														

== See also ==
- Samsung Electronics
- Samsung Galaxy S series
- Samsung Galaxy Tab
- Samsung Galaxy Note
