= Galaxy Tab S =

Galaxy Tab S may refer to:

- Samsung Galaxy Tab S 8.4
- Samsung Galaxy Tab S 10.5
