= Samsung Galaxy Book (2017) =

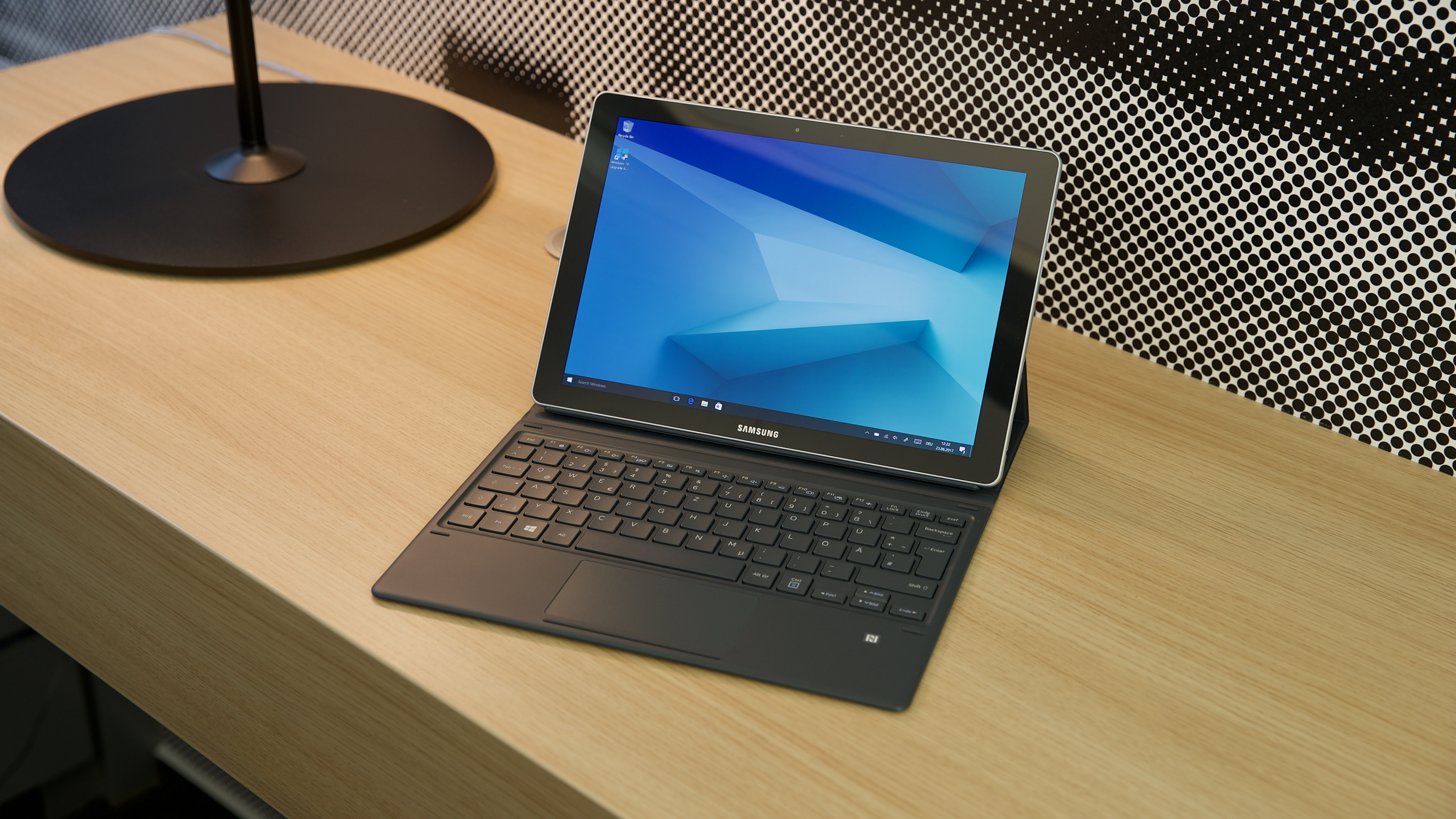
- Brand: Samsung
- Manufacturer: Samsung Electronics
- Type: Tablet
- Series: Galaxy Book
- Family: Samsung Galaxy
- First released: February 2017
- Predecessor: Galaxy TabPro S
- Successor: Galaxy Book 2
- Dimensions: 261.2 x 179.1 x 8.9 mm metal body; 291.3x199.8x7.4 mm metal body;
- Weight: 10.6" [640g(Wi-Fi) / 650g(LTE)], 12.0" [754g (Wi-Fi and LTE)]
- Operating system: Original: Windows 10 1607; Current: One UI Book 4 (Windows 11 21H2)
- CPU: Intel 7th Gen i5 Dual Core (Kaby Lake), 3.1 GHz Intel Core m3
- Memory: 4 GB or 8GB RAM
- Storage: 64/128/256 GB
- Removable storage: microSD, up to 256 GB
- Battery: 30.4 Wh, 7.7 V w/Fast Charging (10.6"), 39.04 Wh, 7.7 V w/Fast Charging (12.0")
- Rear camera: 13 MP Auto focus
- Front camera: 5 MP
- Display: 1920x1280 3:2 TFT FHD (10.6") and 2160x1440 3:2 AMOLED (12.0")
- Connectivity: Wi-Fi 802.11 a/b/g/n/ac, 2X2 MIMO; LTE Cat. 6; Bluetooth® 4.1 BLE; GPS + GLONASS; USB 3.1(Type-C)(2 ports)

The Samsung Galaxy Book is a Windows 10-based 2-in-1 PC produced and marketed by Samsung Electronics. It is the successor of the Galaxy TabPro S and comes in 2 models: a 10.6-inch model and a 12-inch model. It was the first model of the Samsung Galaxy Book line.

Its successor, the Galaxy Book 2, was announced in October 2018. On 7 August 2019, the Galaxy Book S was announced. On 28 April 2021, the Galaxy Book Pro and Galaxy Book Pro 360 were announced. The follow-on Samsung Galaxy Book 3 series, including an Ultra, Pro, and Pro 360 were released 17 February 2023

== History ==
On 27 February 2017, Samsung unveiled the Galaxy Book alongside the Samsung Galaxy Tab S3 at MWC 2017.

The introductory price for the 12-inch model was $1,130 (Wi-Fi only) and $1,300 (LTE via Verizon). The 10-inch model started at $630.

== Specifications ==
The Galaxy Book 10 shares the same fanless design (the 12" model includes a fan), and the right side of the device houses a USB-C connection. The device weight around 650 grams for the 10.6 model, and 750 grams for the 12-inch model. Compared to the Tab S3, the camera is now located horizontally instead vertically, and there is no home button. There are two stereo speakers located at the top and bottom. The top bezel houses a power button, volume controls, and two microphones.

The device retains several features that are typically found in the Samsung Galaxy Note series, such as Air Command, Smart Select, Samsung Notes, etc. Both models include an S Pen (its first appearance on a Windows product), and a detachable folio keyboard case with a kickstand. The Galaxy Book also supports quick-charge technology, which allows the tablet to charge fully in a shorter amount of time. In terms of battery life, the 10.6-inch option is claimed to last 10 hours, and the 12-inch model slightly longer at 10.5 hours.

It has 1920x1280 TFT FHD (10.6-inch) and 2160x1440 AMOLED (12.0-inch) resolution display with an aspect ratio of 3:2. The S-pen provides 4096 levels of sensitivity.

== Reception ==
The Galaxy Book was generally well received with regards to the AMOLED screen, the S-pen input response, strong CPU performance, and the full support of Windows 10. However, criticism has been aimed towards the battery life, issues with heating while multitasking, and the fragility of the keyboard attachment.

Preceded by Samsung Galaxy TabPro S	Samsung Galaxy Book; 2017	Succeeded by Samsung Galaxy Book2
