= Samsung Galaxy Tab S4 =

2018 flagship tablet by Samsung Electronics

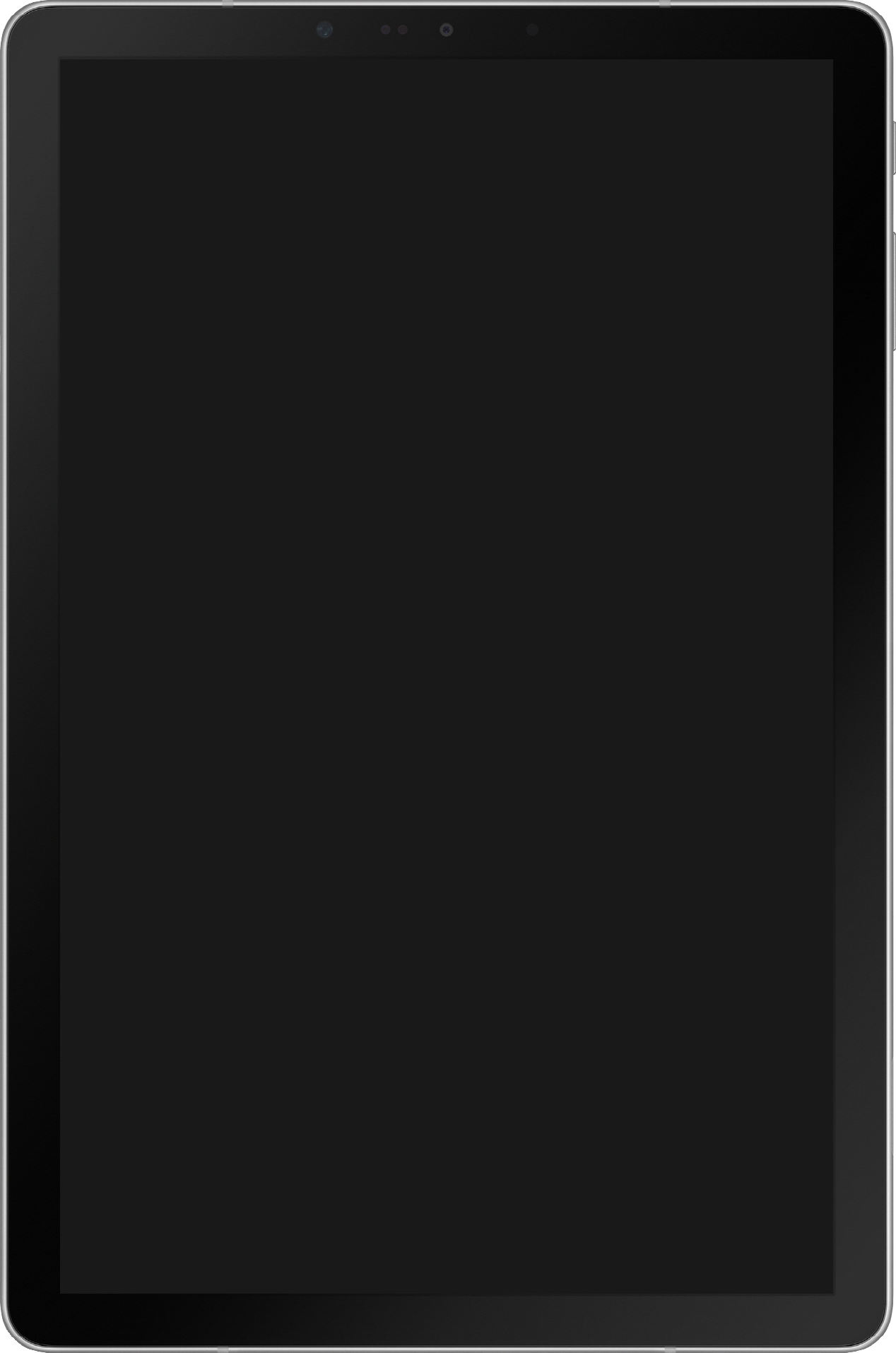
- Samsung Galaxy Tab S4 (10.5-inch)
- Brand: Samsung
- Manufacturer: Samsung Electronics
- Type: Tablet computer
- Series: Galaxy Tab S
- Family: Samsung Galaxy
- First released: August 1, 2018; 8 years ago
- Predecessor: Samsung Galaxy Tab S3
- Successor: Samsung Galaxy Tab S6
- Related: Samsung Galaxy Tab A 10.5; Samsung Galaxy Tab S5e
- Form factor: Bar
- Dimensions: 249.3 mm (9.81 in) (h); 164.3 mm (6.47 in) (w); 7.1 mm (0.28 in) (d)
- Weight: Wi-Fi: 482 g (1.063 lb); Wi-Fi + Cellular: 483 g (1.065 lb)
- Operating system: Original: Android 8.1 "Oreo" with Samsung Experience 9.5; Current: Android 10 with One UI 2.0
- System-on-chip: Qualcomm MSM8998 Snapdragon 835
- CPU: Octa-core (4×2.35 GHz Kryo and 4×1.9 GHz Kryo)
- GPU: Adreno 540
- Memory: 4 GB LPDDR4X SDRAM
- Storage: 64 or 256 GB flash memory
- Removable storage: microSDXC, expandable up to 400 GB
- Battery: 7,300 mAh
- Rear camera: 13 megapixels 4K
- Front camera: 8 megapixels 1080p
- Display: 10.5 in (267.2 mm) diagonal, 2560×1600 px (287 ppi) (AMOLED panel), 16:10 aspect ratio
- Sound: Quad stereo speakers tuned by AKG, Dolby Atmos surround sound
- Connectivity: Wi-Fi 802.11 a/b/g/n/ac (2.4 and 5GHz), MIMO, Bluetooth 5.0, USB-C, 3.5mm headphone jack, location (GPS, Galileo, GLONASS, BeiDou)
- Data inputs: Accelerometer; Barometer; Iris scanner Magnetometer; Gyroscope; Hall sensor Proximity sensor
- Other: Price: (United States) $649.99 (WIFI/64G) $749.99 (WIFI/256G) $729.99 (LTE/64G) (UK) £599 (WIFI/64G) £649 (LTE/64G) (France/Germany); 699€ (WIFI/64G); 759€ (LTE/64G) (Korea); 792000₩ (WIFI/64G); 891000₩ (WIFI/256G); 880000₩ (LTE/64G); 990000₩ (LTE/256G); Samsung online store: 5888¥(CNY) (LTE/64G); 6388¥(CNY) (LTE/256G); 4888¥(CNY) (WIFI/64G)
- Website: Official website

The Samsung Galaxy Tab S4 is a Android-based tablet computer manufactured, developed and produced by Samsung Electronics. It is the successor of the Galaxy Tab S3, and was announced alongside the cheaper Samsung Galaxy Tab A 10.5.

== History ==
The Tab S4 was revealed online on August 1, 2018, with preorders for Wi-Fi and cellular models beginning on the same day. In the United States at launch, LTE models are available for purchase via Verizon, with support from other carriers arriving in Q3 2018.

== Specifications ==
=== Hardware ===
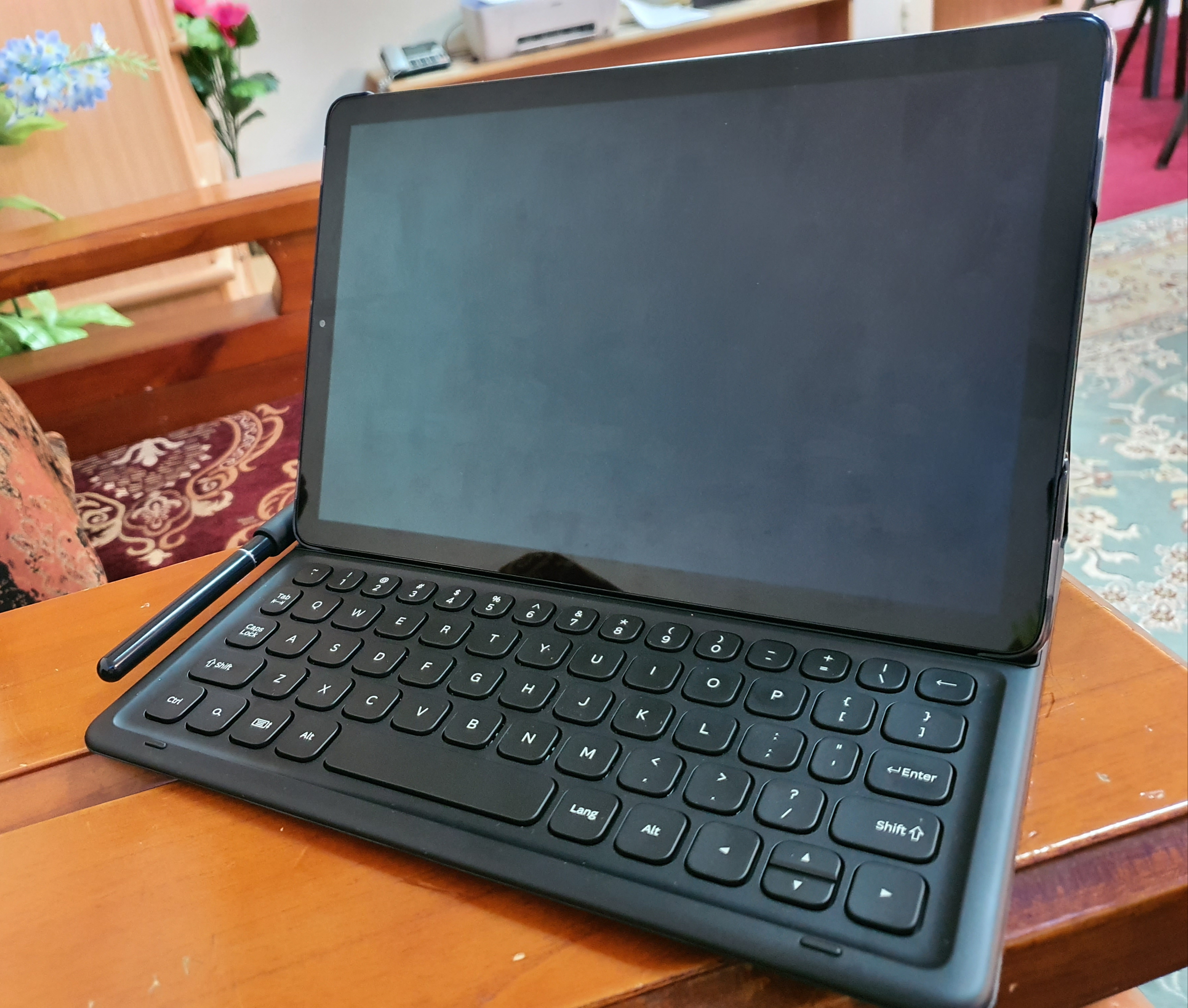
Samsung Galaxy Tab S4 with keyboard and pen

The Tab S4 features an octa-core Qualcomm Snapdragon 835 with 4 GB of LPDDR4X memory. It is available in 64 or 256 GB storage variants, with expandable microSD card support for up to 400 GB (as of Oct 2022 1TB mSD cards do work). The Tab S4 has Bluetooth 5.0 support and a larger 7,300 mAh battery with adaptive fast charging, and a claimed video playback time of up to 16 hours. The device has integrated far-field microphones that allow Google Assistant to be controlled from far distances.

Compared to the Galaxy Tab S3, the Tab S4 has a larger 10.5-inch 2560x1600 display with a 16:10 aspect ratio and slimmer bezels, allowing its footprint to be similar to its predecessor. As a result, the Tab S4 no longer features a fingerprint sensor or navigation and home buttons, and uses a facial and iris scanner instead. The front-facing selfie-camera has been upgraded to 8 megapixels and can record in 1080p resolution. The four stereo speakers have also been tuned by AKG and support Dolby Atmos surround sound.

The front and back glass uses Gorilla Glass 3 and the front doesn't have the Samsung logo.

=== Software ===
The Tab S4 comes with Samsung Experience 9.5, which is based on Android 8.1.0 Oreo. The device's firmware was made upgradable to One UI, which is based on Android 9, on a firmware upgrade rollout starting in April 2019.

New features include Samsung Knox protection and a Daily Board mode, that allows for the display of photos, and weather and calendar information. Bixby 2.0 will be added in a future software update in 2019.

Samsung DeX is also natively supported and is launched on the device when a keyboard cover is connected. The Tab S4 can run up to 20 multiple application windows simultaneously, and supports split screen, drag and drop, and right click functionality. When connected to an external monitor, the screen can be used as a touchpad.

=== Accessories ===
The Tab S4 is included with an improved S Pen stylus with a 0.7 mm tip and 4,096 pressure sensitivity levels, similar to the S Pen on the Galaxy Note 8. It weighs 9.1 grams (0.32 oz) and supports features such as air commands, translation of on-screen text, screen-off memos, and live messages.

A detachable keyboard accessory is also offered separately and magnetically latches onto the Tab S4. It has a holster for the S Pen but does not include a touchpad, requiring users to rely on the touchscreen, S Pen or a bluetooth mouse for input.
