= Samsung Galaxy Tab S9 =

2023 flagship tablets by Samsung Electronics

Samsung Galaxy Tab S9 series

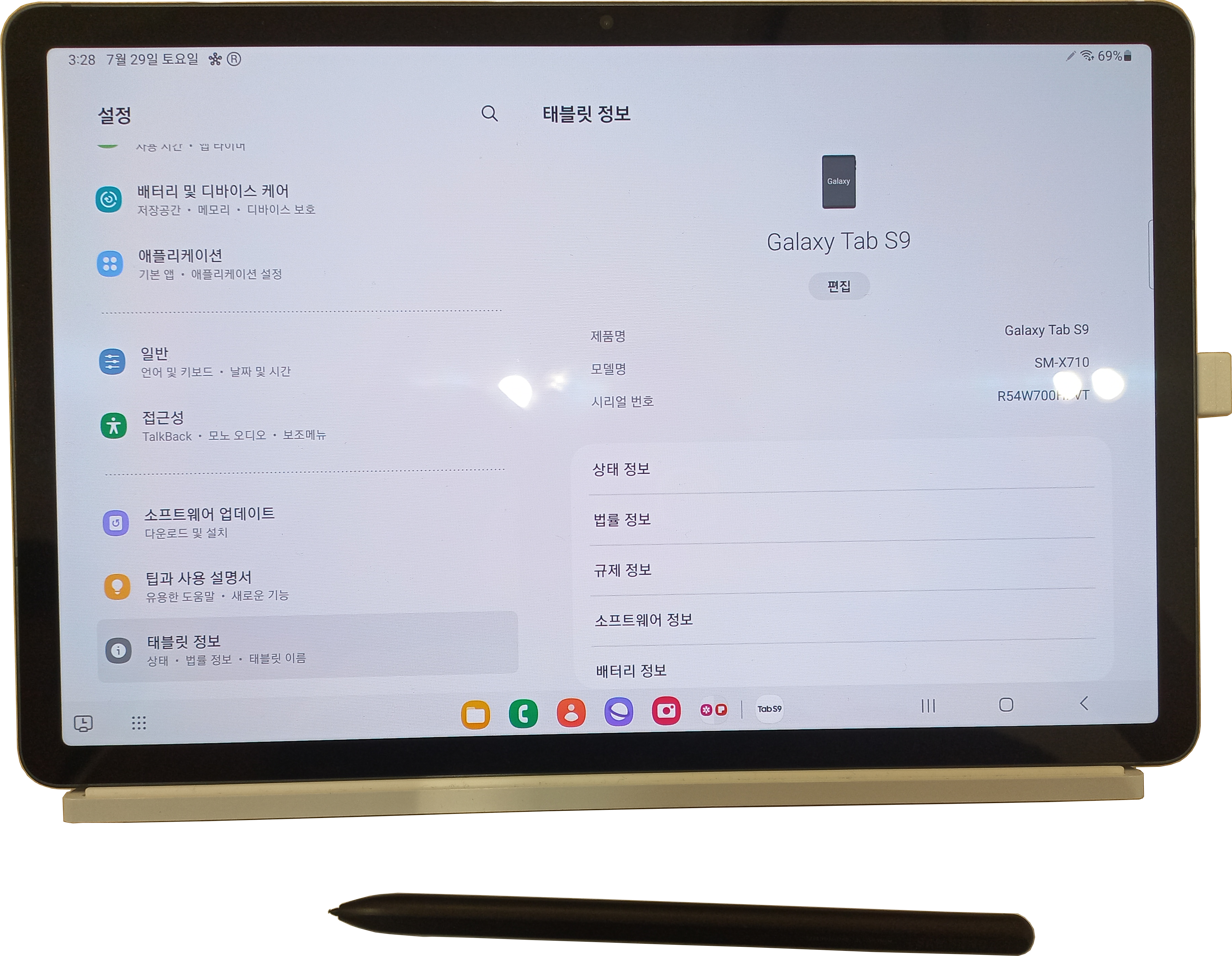
- Flat Galaxy Tab S9 model with the S-Pen Pro
- Brand: Samsung
- Manufacturer: Samsung Electronics
- Type: Tablet computer
- Series: Galaxy Tab S
- Family: Samsung Galaxy
- First released: Tab S9/S9+/S9 Ultra: July 26, 2023; 3 years ago Tab S9 FE/FE+: October 15, 2023; 3 years ago
- Availability by region: Tab S9/S9+/S9 Ultra: August 11, 2023; 3 years ago Tab S9 FE/FE+: October 15, 2023; 3 years ago
- Discontinued: Tab S9/S9+/S9 Ultra: September 27, 2024; 2 years ago Tab S9 FE/FE+: April 2, 2025; 19 months ago
- Predecessor: Samsung Galaxy Tab S7 FE; Samsung Galaxy Tab S8
- Successor: Samsung Galaxy Tab S10
- Compatible networks: 2G GSM / 3G HSPA / 4G LTE / 5G NR (only 5G models)
- Form factor: Bar
- Colors: Tab S9/S9+/S9 Ultra: Beige, Graphite; Tab S9 FE/FE+: Mint, Lavender, Grey, Silver
- Dimensions: Tab S9: 254.3 mm (10.01 in) H 165.8 mm (6.53 in) W 5.9 mm (0.23 in) D Tab S9+: 285.4 mm (11.24 in) H 185.4 mm (7.30 in) W 5.7 mm (0.22 in) D Tab S9 Ultra: 326.4 mm (12.85 in) H 208.6 mm (8.21 in) W 5.5 mm (0.22 in) D Tab S9 FE: 254.3 mm (10.01 in) H 165.8 mm (6.53 in) W 6.5 mm (0.26 in) D Tab S9 FE+: 285.4 mm (11.24 in) H 185.4 mm (7.30 in) W 6.5 mm (0.26 in) D
- Weight: Tab S9: 498 g (17.6 oz) (Wi-Fi); 500 g (18 oz) (5G); Tab S9+: 581 g (20.5 oz) (Wi-Fi); 586 g (20.7 oz) (5G); Tab S9 Ultra: 732 g (25.8 oz) (Wi-Fi); 737 g (26.0 oz) (5G); Tab S9 FE: 523 g (18.4 oz); Tab S9 FE+: 528 g (18.6 oz)
- Operating system: Original: Android 13 with One UI 5.1.1; Current: Android 16 with One UI 8.5
- System-on-chip: Tab S9/S9+/S9 Ultra: Qualcomm Snapdragon 8 Gen 2 for Galaxy (4 nm); Tab S9 FE/FE+: Exynos 1380 (4nm)
- CPU: Tab S9/S9+/S9 Ultra: Octa-core (1x3.36 GHz Cortex-X3 & 2x2.8 GHz Cortex-A715 & 2x2.8 GHz Cortex-A710 & 3x2.0 GHz Cortex-A510); Tab S9 FE/FE+: Octa-core (4x2.4 GHz Cortex-A78 & 4x2.0 GHz Cortex-A55)
- GPU: Tab S9/S9+/S9 Ultra: Adreno 740; Tab S9 FE/FE+: Mali-G68 MP5
- Modem: Qualcomm Snapdragon X73 5G
- Memory: Tab S9 and S9+: 8 GB, 12 GB RAM; Tab S9 Ultra: 8 GB, 12 GB, 16 GB RAM; Tab S9 FE: 6 GB, 8 GB RAM; Tab S9 FE+: 8 GB, 12 GB RAM
- Storage: Tab S9: 128 GB, 256 GB; Tab S9+: 256 GB, 512 GB; Tab S9 Ultra: 256 GB, 512 GB, 1 TB; Tab S9 FE/FE+: 128 GB, 256 GB
- Removable storage: microSDXC, up to 1 TB
- SIM: Nano-SIM (only 5G models)
- Battery: Tab S9: 8400 mAh; Tab S9+: 10090 mAh; Tab S9 Ultra: 11200 mAh; Tab S9 FE: 8000 mAh; Tab S9 FE+: 10090 mAh
- Charging: USB Power Delivery: 45W (PPS), 15W (non-PPS)
- Rear camera: 13 MP, f/2.0, 26mm (wide), 1/3.4", 1.0 μm, AF; 8 MP, f/2.2, (ultrawide); LED flash, HDR, panorama 4K@30/60fps, 1080p@30fps; FE, FE+: 8 MP, f/1.9 (ultrawide)
- Front camera: Tab S9 and S9+: 12 MP, f/2.4, 120° (ultrawide); Tab S9 Ultra: 12 MP, f/2.2, 26mm (wide) 12 MP, f/2.4, 120° (ultrawide)
- Display: Tab S9: 11.0 in (280 mm) Dynamic AMOLED 2X, 2560 × 1600 pixels, 16:10 aspect ratio (~274 ppi density), 120Hz refresh rate Tab S9+: 12.4 in (310 mm) Dynamic AMOLED 2X, 2800 × 1752 pixels, 16:10 aspect ratio (~266 ppi density), 120Hz refresh rate Tab S9 Ultra: 14.6 in (370 mm) Dynamic AMOLED 2X, 2960 × 1848 pixels, 16:10 aspect ratio (~240 ppi density), 120Hz refresh rate Tab S9 FE: 10.9 in (280 mm) PLS TFT, 2304 × 1440 pixels, 16:10 aspect ratio (249 ppi density), 90Hz refresh rate Tab S9 FE+: 12.4 in (310 mm) PLS TFT, 2560 × 1600 pixels, 16:10 aspect ratio (243 ppi density), 90Hz refresh rate
- Sound: Quad stereo loudspeakers tuned by AKG; FE, FE+: dual stereo speakers
- Connectivity: S9, S9+, S9 Ultra: USB Type-C 3.2 with Displayport; S9 FE, S9 FE+: USB Type-C 2.0; Wi-Fi 802.11 a/b/g/n/ac/ax, dual-band, Wi-Fi Direct, hotspot Bluetooth 5.3, A2DP, LE
- Data inputs: S Pen; Fingerprint scanner; Tab S9/S9+/S9 Ultra: (under display, optical); Tab S9 FE/FE+: in power button; Accelerometer; Gyroscope; Proximity sensor; Compass
- Water resistance: IP68, up to 1.5 m (4.9 ft) for 30 minutes
- Model: Tab S9: SM-X710, SM-X716; Tab S9+: SM-X810, SM-X816; Tab S9 Ultra: SM-X910, SM-X916; Tab S9 FE: SM-X510, SM-X516; Tab S9 FE+: SM-X610, SM-X616
- Website: www.samsung.com/us/tablets/galaxy-tab-s9/

The Samsung Galaxy Tab S9 is a series of Android-based tablet computers developed and marketed by Samsung Electronics. Unveiled at Samsung's Galaxy Unpacked event on July 26, 2023, in Seoul, South Korea, they serve as the successor to the Galaxy Tab S8 series. The tablet's announcement, alongside the Galaxy Z Fold 5, Galaxy Z Flip 5, and Galaxy Watch 6, marked the first Galaxy Unpacked to be held in Samsung's home country of South Korea. The tablets were released on August 11, 2023.

On October 3, 2023, Samsung announced the Galaxy Tab S9 FE and Galaxy Tab S9 FE+, alongside the Galaxy S23 FE, with notable differences include using LCD screens of lower resolutions and refresh rate, a mid-range Exynos 1380 chipset, two speakers, a slower USB 2.0 port without DisplayPort support (no external monitor), Wi-Fi 6 (2.4 GHz, 5 GHz), a different camera setup, and having fingerprint scanner on the power button.

This release marks the final iteration in which the flagship models (the Tab S9, S9+, and S9 Ultra) were released in three distinct screen sizes, succeeding flagship models would be released in two different screen sizes only (Ultra and a second model which would alternate between the Plus and base variants).

== Line-up ==
The Galaxy Tab S9 series includes five models: Galaxy Tab S9, Galaxy Tab S9+, Galaxy Tab S9 Ultra, Galaxy Tab S9 FE, and Galaxy Tab S9 FE+. It also marked the first time that Samsung released two FE models.

With the release of the first three models, it brings minor upgrades over its predecessor, such as Dynamic AMOLED 2X display on all models, introduction of an IP rating on a tablet, lower latency S Pen, under display fingerprint sensor, and slightly bigger battery (for the Tab S9).

== Features ==
=== Design ===
The tablets still use the same aluminum body from its predecessors, and only comes in two different colors (four for the FE models). For the first time, all tablets under this release now support IP68, a first for the overall Tab S series (and also to the FE models).

Model	Galaxy Tab S9, Galaxy Tab S9+ and Galaxy Tab S9 Ultra	Galaxy Tab S9 FE and Galaxy Tab S9 FE+
Base colors	Graphite; Beige	Mint; Gray; Lavender; Silver

=== Display ===
The first three tablets (Galaxy Tab S9, Galaxy Tab S9+, and the Galaxy Tab S9 Ultra) inherits the same screen size, the same display resolution (2560×1600, 1752×2800, and 1848×2960, respectively) and refresh rate (all 120 Hz) from its predecessors, but the former now has a Dynamic AMOLED 2X display, with the remaining tablets upgraded to a Dynamic AMOLED 2X display from its predecessors.

The Galaxy Tab S9 FE and Galaxy Tab S9 FE+, meanwhile, uses a TFT LCD display and a lower refresh rate (90 Hz).

=== Performance ===
The first three tablets uses the Qualcomm Snapdragon 8 Gen 2 for Galaxy chipset, which is a higher clocked version of the regular Snapdragon 8 Gen 2 chipset, with RAM variants ranging from 8 GB to 16 GB. It is also the last Samsung Galaxy Tab S series tablet to have a Qualcomm Snapdragon chipset, as its successors now use a Mediatek Dimensity chipset.

The FE models uses the older Exynos 1380 chipset, which was first used on the Galaxy A54 and was also used again on the Galaxy Tab S10 Lite. RAM variants range from 6 GB to 12 GB, with the latter being a first for the FE lineup.

=== Cameras ===
The rear camera for the Galaxy Tab S9 drops the ultrawide camera, but inherits the same primary and front cameras from its predecessor. The rear camera for the Galaxy Tab S9+ upgrades the ultrawide camera to a higher 8 MP resolution, with the front camera and the primary main camera having the same megapixels from its predecessor. The Galaxy Tab S9 Ultra also keeps the same cameras (both rear and front) from its predecessor.

The Galaxy Tab S9 FE only has a single 8 MP rear camera, but the larger model now have an additional 8 MP ultrawide camera, a first for the Tab FE series. The front cameras have a 12 MP sensor.

=== Battery ===
The Galaxy Tab S9+ and Galaxy Tab S9 Ultra keeps the same battery sizes (10090mAh and 11200mAh, respectively) and charging speeds (45W) from its predecessor, while the smaller Galaxy Tab S9, despite having the same 45W charging speed, now have a 8400mAh battery (compared to the 8000mAh from the Tab S8).

The Galaxy Tab S9 FE and Galaxy Tab S9 FE+ have a 8000mAh and 10090mAh battery, respectively. Charging speeds for both devices is at 45W.

=== Software ===
All of the Galaxy Tab S9 tablets have Android 13 and Samsung's One UI 5.1.1 pre-installed. Alongside the Galaxy S23, Galaxy Z Fold 5 and Galaxy Z Flip 5, they are the last Samsung flagships to support 32-bit applications and are set to receive 4 OS upgrades and 5 years of security updates (support ending within 2028). It also marks the last time these devices will receive this level of support, as its successors all had 7 years of support.

	Pre-installed OS	OS Upgrades history				End of support
	Pre-installed OS	1st	2nd	3rd	4th	End of support
Tab S9	Android 13 (One UI 5.1.1)	Android 14 (One UI 6.0); November 2023 (One UI 6.1.1); September 2024	Android 15 (One UI 7.0); April 2025	Android 16 (One UI 8.0); October 2025 (One UI 8.5); May 2026	Android 17 (One UI 9.0); November 2026	Expected within 2028
Tab S9+	Android 13 (One UI 5.1.1)	Android 14 (One UI 6.0); November 2023 (One UI 6.1.1); September 2024	Android 15 (One UI 7.0); April 2025	Android 16 (One UI 8.0); October 2025 (One UI 8.5); May 2026	Android 17 (One UI 9.0); November 2026	Expected within 2028
Tab S9 Ultra	Android 13 (One UI 5.1.1)	Android 14 (One UI 6.0); November 2023 (One UI 6.1.1); September 2024	Android 15 (One UI 7.0); April 2025	Android 16 (One UI 8.0); October 2025 (One UI 8.5); May 2026	Android 17 (One UI 9.0); November 2026	Expected within 2028
Tab S9 FE	Android 13 (One UI 5.1.1)	Android 14 (One UI 6.0); December 2023 (One UI 6.1.1); September 2024	Android 15 (One UI 7.0); May 2025	Android 16 (One UI 8.0); November 2025 (One UI 8.5); May 2026		Expected within 2028
Tab S9 FE+	Android 13 (One UI 5.1.1)	Android 14 (One UI 6.0); December 2023 (One UI 6.1.1); September 2024	Android 15 (One UI 7.0); May 2025	Android 16 (One UI 8.0); November 2025 (One UI 8.5); May 2026		Expected within 2028
