= Samsung Galaxy Tab S6 =

2019 flagship tablets by Samsung Electronics

Samsung Galaxy Tab S6 series

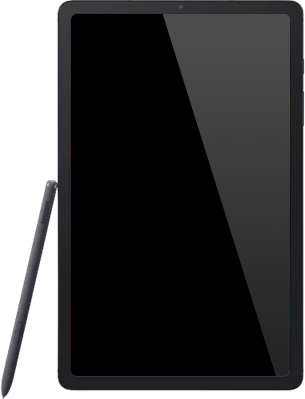
- Galaxy Tab S6 Lite
- Brand: Samsung
- Manufacturer: Samsung Electronics
- Type: Tablet computer
- Series: Galaxy Tab S
- Family: Samsung Galaxy
- First released: Tab S6: July 31, 2019; 7 years ago Tab S6 5G: January 29, 2020; 6 years ago Tab S6 Lite: April 2, 2020; 6 years ago Tab S6 Lite 2022: May 14, 2022; 4 years ago Tab S6 Lite 2024: March 26, 2024; 2 years ago
- Availability by region: Tab S6: July 31, 2019; 7 years ago Tab S6 5G: January 29, 2020; 6 years ago Tab S6 Lite: May 16, 2020; 6 years ago Tab S6 Lite 2022: May 23, 2022; 4 years ago Tab S6 Lite 2024: March 28, 2024; 2 years ago
- Discontinued: Tab S6 and S6 5G: August 5, 2020; 6 years ago
- Predecessor: Samsung Galaxy Tab S4; Samsung Galaxy Tab S5e
- Successor: Samsung Galaxy Tab S7; Samsung Galaxy Tab S10 Lite (for Tab S6 Lite)
- Related: Samsung Galaxy Tab S5e
- Compatible networks: Tab S6: GSM / HSPA / LTE; Tab S6 5G: GSM / HSPA / LTE / 5G
- Form factor: Bar
- Colors: Tab S6: Mountain Gray, Cloud Blue, Rose Blush; Tab S6 5G: Mountain Gray; Tab S6 Lite: Chiffon Pink, Angora Blue, Oxford Gray; Tab S6 Lite 2022: Chiffon Pink, Angora Blue, Oxford Gray; Tab S6 Lite 2024: Oxford Gray, Chiffon Pink, Mint
- Dimensions: 244.5 mm (9.63 in) H 159.5 mm (6.28 in) W 5.7 mm (0.22 in) D
- Weight: Tab S6 & Tab S6 5G: 420g Tab S6 Lite (2020, 2022 & 2024): 465/467g
- Operating system: S6 and S6 5G: Original: Android 9.0 Pie with One UI 1.5; Current: Android 12.1/12L with One UI 4.1.1; S6 Lite: Original: Android 10 with One UI 2.1; Current: Android 13 with One UI 5.1.1; S6 Lite 2022: Original: Android 12 with One UI 4.1; Current: Android 14 with One UI 6.1.1; S6 Lite 2024: Original: Android 14 with One UI 6.1; Current: Android 16 with One UI 8.5
- System-on-chip: Tab S6: Qualcomm Snapdragon 855 (7 nm); Tab S6 5G: Qualcomm Snapdragon 855+ (7 nm); Tab S6 Lite: Exynos 9611 (10nm); Tab S6 Lite 2022: Qualcomm Snapdragon 720G/732G (8nm); Tab S6 Lite 2024: Exynos 1280 (5nm)
- CPU: Tab S6: Octa-core (1x2.84 GHz Kryo 485 & 3x2.42 GHz Kryo 485 & 4x1.78 GHz Kryo 485); Tab S6 5G: Octa-core (1x2.96 GHz Kryo 485 & 3x2.42 GHz Kryo 485 & 4x1.8 GHz Kryo 485); Tab S6 Lite: Octa-core (4x2.3 GHz Cortex-A73 & 4x1.7 GHz Cortex-A53; Tab S6 Lite 2022: Octa-core (2x2.3 GHz Kyro 465/470 Gold & 6x1.8 GHz Kyro 465/470 Silver); Tab S6 Lite 2024: Octa-core (2x2.4 GHz Cortex-A78 & 6x2.0 GHz Cortex-A55)
- GPU: Tab S6/S6 5G: Adreno 640; Tab S6 Lite: Mali-G72 MP3; Tab S6 Lite 2022: Adreno 618; Tab S6 Lite 2024: Mali-G68 MP4
- Memory: Tab S6: 4 GB, 6 GB, 8 GB RAM; Tab S6 5G: 6 GB RAM; Tab S6 Lite (2020, 2022 & 2024): 4 GB RAM
- Storage: Tab S6: 64 GB, 128 GB, 256 GB UFS 3.0; Tab S6 5G: 128 GB UFS 3.0; Tab S6 Lite (2020, 2022 & 2024): 64 and 128 GB
- Removable storage: microSDXC (up to 1 TB)
- SIM: Nano-SIM (where applicable)
- Battery: Li-Po 7040 mAh, non-removable
- Charging: Wired fast charging up to 15W
- Rear camera: Tab S6: 13 MP, f/2.0, 26mm wide, 1/3.4", 1.0µm, AF; 5 MP, f/2.2, 12mm ultrawide, 1.12µm; HDR, panorama; 4K@30fps; Tab S6 Lite: 8 MP, (wide), 1/4.0", 1.12µm; 1080p@30fps
- Front camera: Tab S6: 8 MP, f/2.0, 26mm wide, 1/4", 1.12µm; Tab S6 Lite: 5 MP, (wide); All: 1080p@30fps
- Display: Tab S6: 10.5 in (270 mm); 1600 × 2560 px resolution, 16:10 ratio (~287 ppi density); Super AMOLED, HDR10+ Tab S6 Lite (2020, 2022 & 2024): 10.3 in (260 mm); 1200 × 2000 px resolution, 5:3 ratio (~224 ppi density); TFT LCD
- Sound: Loudspeaker; Tuned by AKG
- Connectivity: Wi-Fi 802.11 a/b/g/n/ac, dual-band, Wi-Fi Direct, hotspot Bluetooth 5.0, A2DP, LE
- Data inputs: USB Type-C 3.1; Fingerprint (under display, optical); Accelerometer; Gyroscope; Proximity sensor; Compass
- Water resistance: none
- Model: S6: SM-T860 (Wi-Fi) SM-T865 (LTE) SM-T866N (5G); S6 Lite: SM-P610N, SM-P615, SM-P610; S6 Lite 2022: SM-P613, SM-P619; S6 Lite 2024: SM-P620 (Wi-Fi), SM-P625 (4G)

The Samsung Galaxy Tab S6 is a series of Android-based tablet computers developed and marketed by Samsung Electronics. There were five models released in total: a base (Wi-Fi only/Wi-Fi and LTE) model (which was announced on July 31, 2019), 5G variant of the base model (which was announced on January 29, 2020), and the Lite model which was released in three variants (announced on April 2, 2020, May 13, 2022, and on March 26, 2024).

The base models were succeeded by the Galaxy Tab S7, while the Lite variants were succeeded by the Galaxy Tab S10 Lite.

== Features ==
=== Design ===
All models, just like its predecessors, continue to feature an aluminum body and glass for the screen. It also has a bundled S Pen, just like its predecessors.

Model	Galaxy Tab S6 Wi-Fi only and Wi-Fi + LTE models	Galaxy Tab S6 5G model	Galaxy Tab S6 Lite 2020 variant	Galaxy Tab S6 Lite 2022 variant	Galaxy Tab S6 Lite 2024 variant
Base colors	Cloud Blue; Mountain Gray; Rose Blush	Mountain Gray	Angora Blue; Oxford Gray; Chiffon Pink		Mint; Oxford Gray; Chiffon Pink

=== Display ===
The base models feature a 10.5-inch 2560 x 1600 Super AMOLED display with an aspect ratio of 16:10. The Lite variants feature a 10.4-inch 2000 × 1200 TFT LCD with a 5:3 aspect ratio.

=== Performance ===
The base models uses the Qualcomm Snapdragon 855 SoC, while the Lite models were featured with multiple SoCs such as the Samsung Exynos 9611 (for the 2020 variant), Qualcomm Snapdragon 720G or 732G (for the 2022 variant), and the Samsung Exynos 1280 (for the 2024 variant).

RAM options ranges from 4 GB to 8 GB for the base models, while the Lite models were only sold in a single 4 GB RAM option. Storage options ranges from 64 GB to 256 GB for the base models, while the Lite models were only available in 64 GB or 128 GB.

All models feature support for microSD cards. UFS 3.0 is used as its internal storage type for the base models, while the Lite models feature a slower UFS 2.0 storage type.

=== Camera ===
The base models includes dual rear-facing cameras: a 13 MP (f/2.0) primary 26 mm lens, and a 12 MP (f/2.2) ultrawide lens; the front-facing camera uses an 8-megapixel sensor. It is capable of recording 4K video at 30 fps.

The Lite models have a single wide 28mm f/1.9 lens 8-megapixel sensor; the front-facing camera uses a 32mm f/2.0 lens 5-megapixel sensor. It is capable of recording FHD video at 30 fps.

=== Battery ===
All models have a 7040 mAh battery, and is capable of fast charging at up to 15 W.

=== Software ===
The base models were shipped with Android Pie (9.0) out-of-the-box with One UI 1.5. The Lite variants had multiple pre-installed OS and One UI versions throughout its releases.

Software support also varied across models: the base models and the 2020 Lite variant have support for 3 OS upgrades and 4 years of security updates, while the 2022 Lite variant only had support for 2 OS upgrades and 3 years of security updates. All models of the Tab S6 include Samsung DeX.

	Pre-installed OS	OS Upgrades history				End of support
	Pre-installed OS	1st	2nd	3rd	4th	End of support
Tab S6	Android 9 Pie (One UI 1.5)	Android 10 (One UI 2.1); April 2020	Android 11 (One UI 3.0/3.1); March 2021	Android 12 (One UI 4.0); March 2022	—N/a	October 2023
Tab S6 Lite (2020)	Android 10 (One UI 2.0)	Android 11 (One UI 3.1); March 2021	Android 12 (One UI 4.0); March 2022	Android 13 (One UI 5.0); March 2023	—N/a	June 2025
Tab S6 Lite (2022)	Android 12 (One UI 4.0)	Android 13 (One UI 5.0); December 2022	Android 14 (One UI 6.1); April 2024	—N/a		June 2025
Tab S6 Lite (2024)	Android 14 (One UI 6.1)	Android 15 (One UI 7.0); May 2025	Android 16 (One UI 8.0); October 2025 (One UI 8.5); June 2026			
