= Samsung Galaxy Tab S7 =

2020 flagship tablets by Samsung Electronics

Samsung Galaxy Tab S7 series

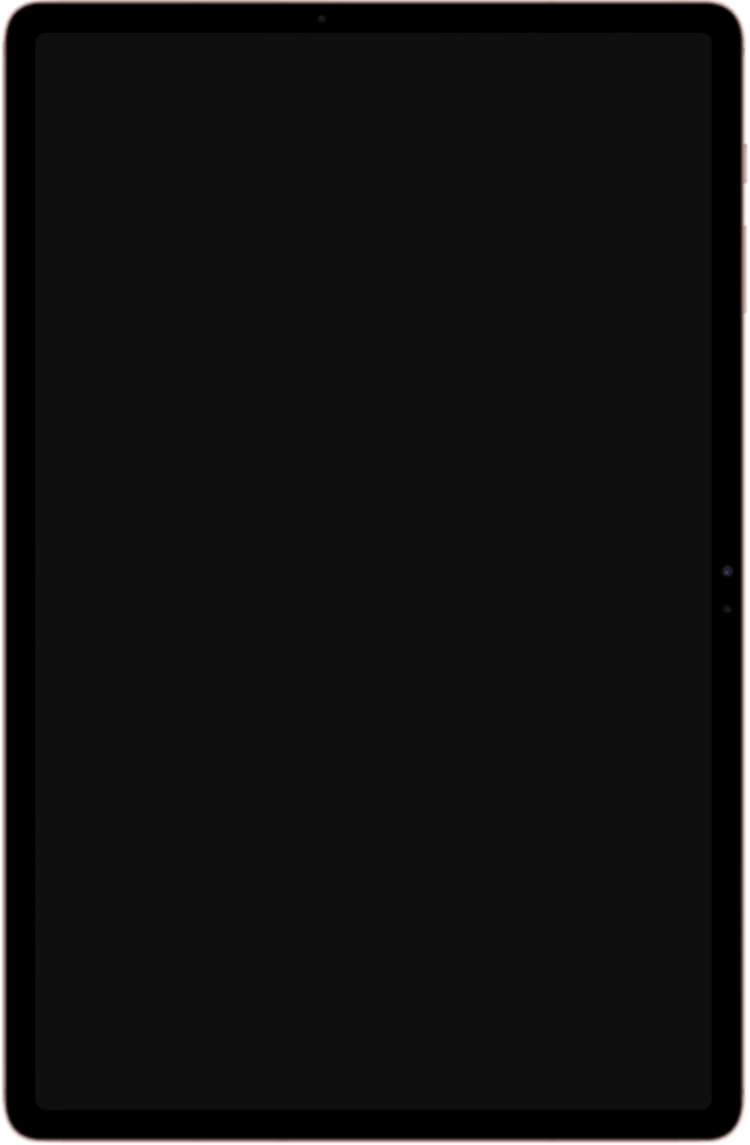
- Samsung Galaxy Tab S7+
- Brand: Samsung
- Manufacturer: Samsung Electronics
- Type: Tablet computer
- Series: Galaxy Tab S
- Family: Samsung Galaxy
- First released: Tab S7 and S7+: August 5, 2020; 6 years ago Tab S7 FE: May 25, 2021; 5 years ago
- Availability by region: Tab S7 and S7+: August 21, 2020; 6 years ago Tab S7 FE: June 18, 2021; 5 years ago
- Predecessor: Samsung Galaxy Tab S6
- Successor: Samsung Galaxy Tab S8; Samsung Galaxy Tab S9 FE & FE+
- Compatible networks: 2G, 3G, 3G, 5G
- Dimensions: Tab S7: 253.8 mm (9.99 in) (h); 165.3 mm (6.51 in) (w); 6.3 mm (0.25 in) (d); Tab S7+: 285.0 mm (11.22 in) (h); 185.0 mm (7.28 in) (w); 5.7 mm (0.22 in) (d); Tab S7 FE: 284.8 mm (11.21 in) (h); 185.0 mm (7.28 in) (w); 6.3 mm (0.25 in) (d)
- Weight: Tab S7: 498 g (1.098 lb) (Wi-Fi), 500 g (1.1 lb) (LTE), 502 g (1.107 lb) (5G); Tab S7+: 575 g (1.268 lb); Tab S7 FE: 608 g (1.340 lb)
- Operating system: Tab S7 and S7+: Original: Android 10 with One UI 2.5; Current: Android 13 with One UI 5.1.1; Tab S7 FE: Original: Android 11 with One UI 3.1; Current: Android 14 with One UI 6.1.1
- System-on-chip: Tab S7/S7+: Snapdragon 865+ Tab S7 FE Wi-Fi: Snapdragon 778G; Tab S7 FE 5G: Snapdragon 750G
- Memory: 4 (FE only), 6 or 8 GB
- Storage: UFS 3.0; 64 (FE only), 128 (CDMA), 256 or 512 GB models and microSDXC slot (dedicated)
- Display: Tab S7: 2560x1600 (274 PPI) IPS LCD, 11.0 in (280 mm) diagonal, 16:10 display Tab S7+: 2800×1752 (266 PPI) OLED display, 12.4 in (310 mm) diagonal, 16:10 display Tab S7 FE: 2560×1600 (243 PPI) TFT LCD, 12.4 in (310 mm) diagonal, 16:10 display
- Connectivity: GSM/CDMA/HSPA/EVDO/LTE/5G, WLAN, 802.11 a/b/g/n/ac/ax, dual band, Wi-Fi Direct & Hotspot, Bluetooth 5.0, A2DP, LE & aptX, A-GPS, GLONASS, BDS & GALILEO, USB 3.2, Type-C 1.0 reversible connector, USB On-The-Go
- Data inputs: Multi-touch screen
- Model: Tab S7: SM-T870 (Wi-Fi), SM-T875 (LTE), SM-T878U (LTE/5G); Tab S7+: SM-T970 (Wi-Fi), SM-T976 (LTE/5G); Tab S7 FE: SM-T730 (Wi-Fi), SM-T736B (LTE/5G), SM-T735 (LTE)
- Website: Samsung Galaxy Tab S7 and Tab S7+ – The Official Samsung Galaxy Site

The Samsung Galaxy Tab S7 is a series of Android-based tablet computers developed and marketed by Samsung Electronics. The Galaxy Tab S7 and Tab S7+ were announced on August 5, 2020, during Samsung's Galaxy Unpacked event in conjunction with the Galaxy Note20 series, Galaxy Z Fold2, Galaxy Watch3 and Galaxy Buds Live, all of which were released on August 21. The Galaxy Tab S7 Fan Edition was announced later, on May 25, 2021, and released on June 18, 2021.

== Design ==
The Galaxy Tab S7 and Tab S7+ maintained a similar design from their predecessor. However, the screen sizes were enlarged, with the 11-inch model replacing the 10.5 inch, and a new 12.4-inch model was introduced. The tablets also came in four colors: Mystic Black, Mystic Silver, Mystic Bronze and Mystic Navy.

== Specifications ==
=== Hardware ===
==== Display ====
The Galaxy Tab S7 features an 11-inch 2560 x 1600 LCD, while the Tab S7+ features a 12.4-inch 2800 x 1752 OLED display. Both models have a 120 Hz refresh rate.

==== Chipset ====
Both tablets feature a Qualcomm Snapdragon 865+ system on a chip. The SoC is based on the 7 nm+ processing technology node. The tablets also feature an Adreno 650 GPU.

==== Storage ====
The Galaxy Tab S7 and Tab S7+ are available in 128, 256, and 512 GB options, though in some regions, not all capacity variants are available. 1 TB of expansion can be added using a microSD card. The base amount of RAM is 6 GB, and is not upgradeable to 8 GB which is a separate model.

==== Battery ====
The Galaxy Tab S7 and Tab S7+ use non-removable Li-Ion batteries rated at 8,000 mAh and 10,090 mAh respectively. They are also capable of 45 W fast charging.

==== Connectivity ====
Both tablets come with 5G standard connectivity, though some regions may have LTE or sub-6 GHz only variants. There is also a Wi-Fi only variant.

==== Cameras ====
Both tablets feature a dual rear camera array. The wide-angle lens is 26mm 13 MP camera with an ƒ/2.0 aperture, while the ultra-wide lens is a 12mm 5 MP camera with an ƒ/2.2 aperture.

==== S-Pen ====
Similar to the Galaxy Note 20 series, the Galaxy Tab S7 and S7+ feature better latency at 9ms. It also gains new Air gestures.

=== Software ===
The Galaxy Tab S7 and S7+ shipped with Android 10 with One UI 2, can be upgraded up to Android 13 with One UI 5, and can be updated to Android 14 with One UI 6 on the Fan Edition only. It also supports Samsung DeX. Due to the Fan Edition release being delayed to 2021, Samsung promised 4 Android OS upgrades (till Android 14) and 5 years Tab of security updates (till 2025).

=== Support ===
The Yab S7 and S7+ tablets reached their end-of-life after support ended with the latest patch delivered in August 2024, whereas the Tab S7 FE continued to be maintained until 2025.

== Gallery ==
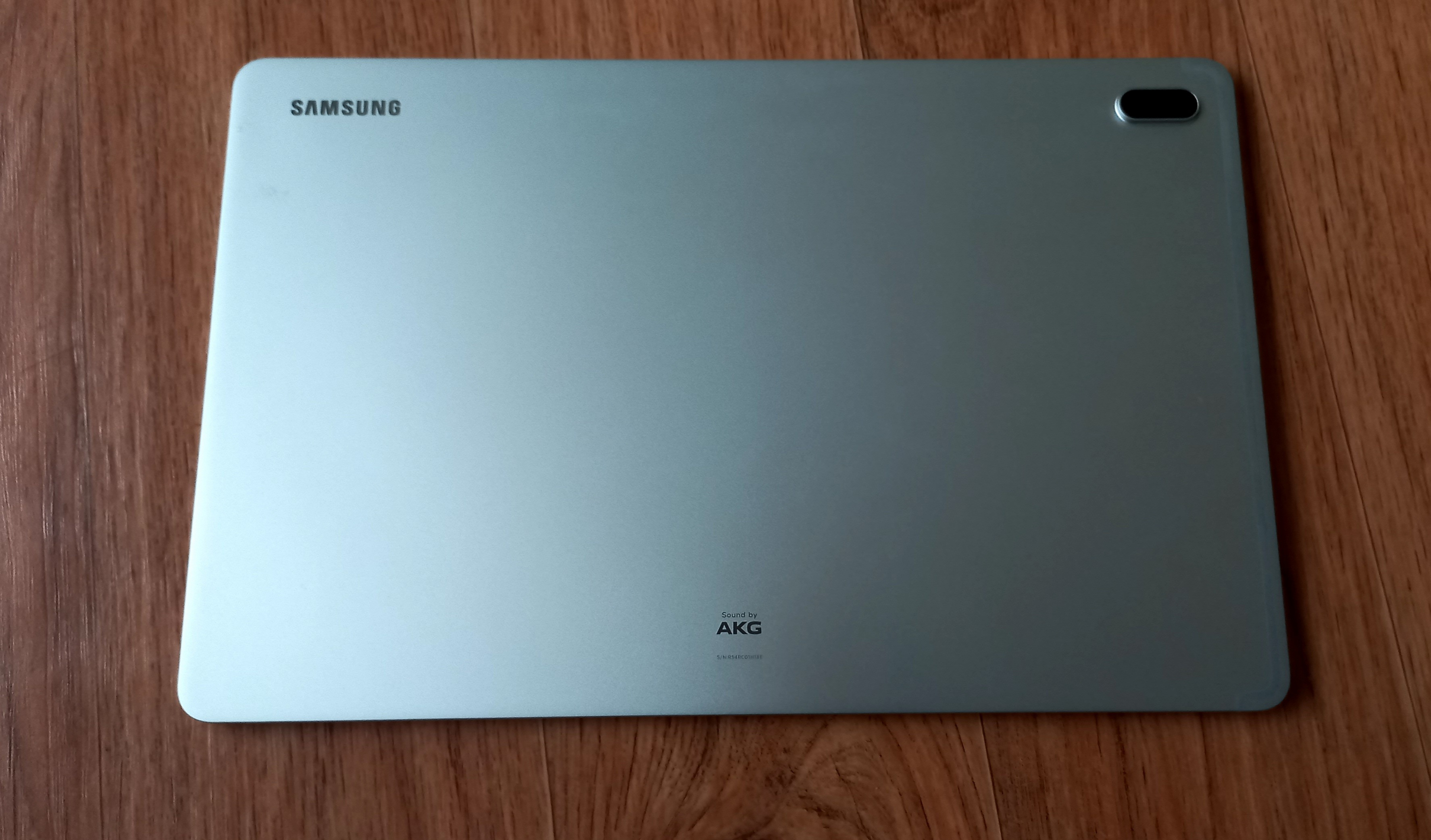
Back of the Samsung Galaxy Tab S7 FE
