= Samsung Galaxy Tab S8 =

2022 flagship tablets by Samsung Electronics

Samsung Galaxy Tab S8 series

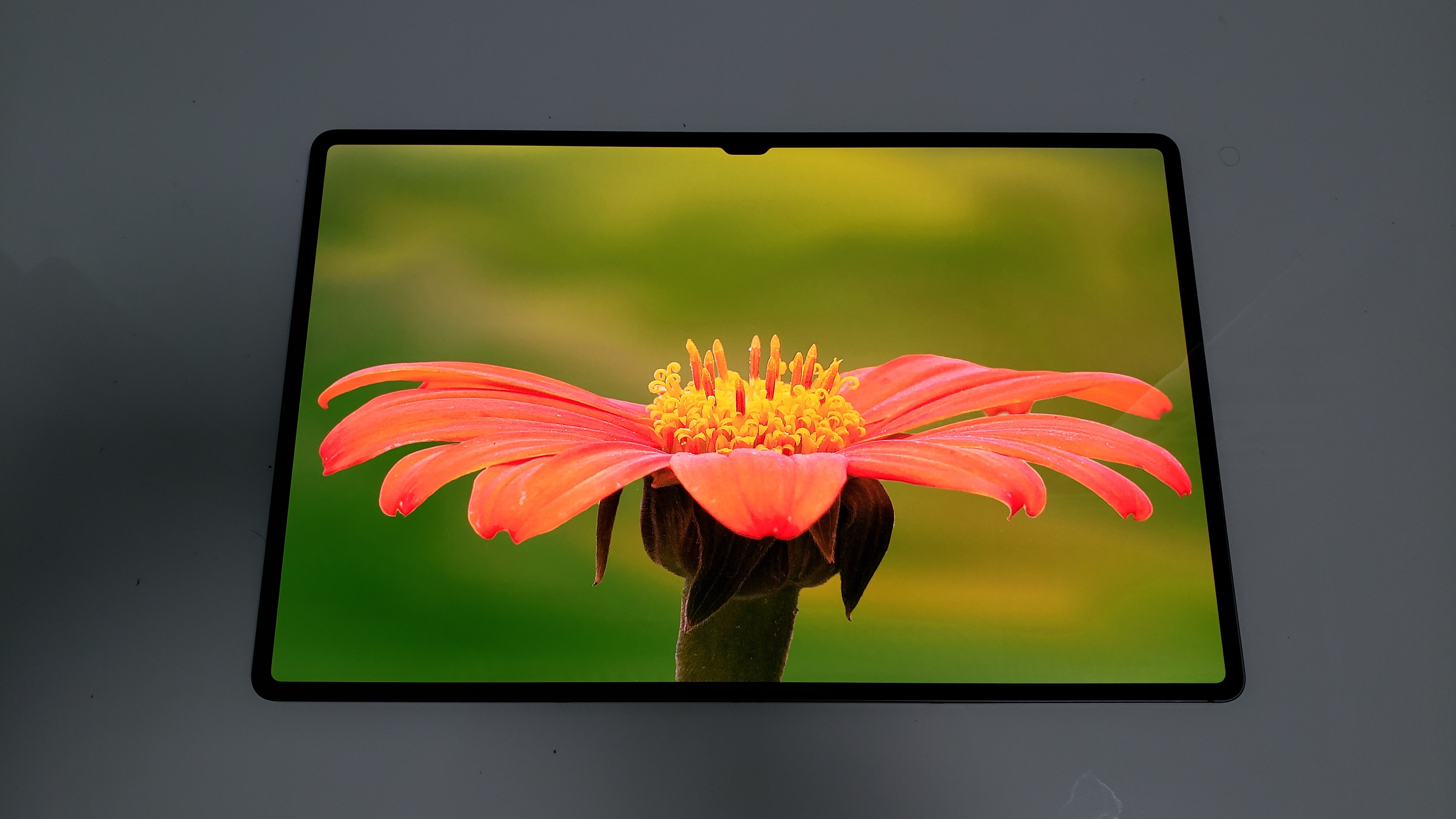
- Front of the Samsung Galaxy Tab S8 Ultra, showcasing its 14.6 inch display at full brightness, its bezels, and the small notch on the display containing 2 front facing cameras
- Brand: Samsung
- Manufacturer: Samsung Electronics
- Type: Tablet Computer
- Series: Galaxy Tab S
- Family: Samsung Galaxy
- First released: February 9, 2022; 4 years ago
- Availability by region: February 25, 2022; 4 years ago
- Discontinued: July 26, 2023; 3 years ago
- Predecessor: Samsung Galaxy Tab S7
- Successor: Samsung Galaxy Tab S9
- Compatible networks: GSM / HSPA / LTE / 5G
- Colors: Tab S8/Tab S8+: Graphite, Silver, Pink Gold; Tab S8 Ultra: Graphite
- Dimensions: Tab S8: 253.8 mm (9.99 in) H 165.3 mm (6.51 in) W 6.3 mm (0.25 in) D Tab S8+: 285 mm (11.2 in) H 185 mm (7.3 in) W 5.7 mm (0.22 in) D Tab S8 Ultra: 326.4 mm (12.85 in) H 208.6 mm (8.21 in) W 5.5 mm (0.22 in) D
- Weight: Tab S8: 503 g (17.7 oz) (Wi-Fi); 507 g (17.9 oz) (5G); Tab S8+: 567 g (20.0 oz) (Wi-Fi); 572 g (20.2 oz) (5G); Tab S8 Ultra: 726 g (25.6 oz) (Wi-Fi); 728 g (25.7 oz) (5G)
- Operating system: Original: Android 12 with One UI 4.1; Current: Android 16 with One UI 8
- System-on-chip: Qualcomm Snapdragon 8 Gen 1 (4 nm)
- CPU: Octa-core (1x3.00 GHz Cortex-X2 & 3x2.50 GHz Cortex-A710 & 4x1.80 GHz Cortex-A510)
- GPU: Adreno 730
- Memory: Tab S8 and S8+: 8 GB, 12 GB RAM; Tab S8 Ultra: 8 GB, 12 GB, 16 GB RAM
- Storage: Tab S8 and S8+: 128 GB, 256 GB; Tab S8 Ultra: 128 GB, 256 GB, 512 GB
- Removable storage: microSDXC, up to 1 TB
- SIM: Nano-SIM
- Battery: Tab S8: 8000 mAh; Tab S8+: 10090 mAh; Tab S8 Ultra: 11200 mAh
- Charging: USB PD: 45W (PPS), 15W (non-PPS)
- Rear camera: 13 MP, f/2.0, 26mm (wide), 1/3.4", 1.0 μm, AF; 6 MP, f/2.2, (ultrawide); LED flash, HDR, panorama 4K@30/60fps, 1080p@30fps
- Front camera: Tab S8 and S8+: 12 MP, f/2.4, 120˚ (ultrawide); Tab S8 Ultra: 12 MP, f/2.2, 26mm (wide); 12 MP, f/2.4, 120˚ (ultrawide)
- Display: Tab S8: 11.0 in (280 mm) TFT LCD, 2560 × 1600 pixels, 16:10 aspect ratio (~274 ppi density), 120Hz refresh rate Tab S8+: 12.4 in (310 mm) Super AMOLED, 2800 × 1752 pixels, 16:10 aspect ratio (~266 ppi density), 120Hz refresh rate Tab S8 Ultra: 14.6 in (370 mm) Super AMOLED, 2960 × 1848 pixels, 16:10 aspect ratio (~240 ppi density), 120Hz refresh rate
- Sound: Quad stereo loudspeakers tuned by AKG
- Connectivity: USB Type-C 3.2; Wi-Fi 802.11 a/b/g/n/ac/ax, dual-band, Wi-Fi Direct, hotspot Bluetooth 5.2, A2DP, LE
- Data inputs: S Pen; Fingerprint (side-mounted); Accelerometer; Gyroscope; Proximity sensor; Compass
- Model: Tab S8: SM-X700, SM-X706, SM-X706B, SM-X706U, SM-X706N; Tab S8+: SM-X800, SM-X806, SM-X806B, SM-X806U, SM-X806N; Tab S8 Ultra: SM-X900, SM-X906, SM-X906B, SM-X906U, SM-X906N
- Codename: Tab S8: Basquait 1 Tab S8+: Basquait 2 Tab S8 Ultra: Basquait 3
- SAR: 0.87 W/kg (body)
- Website: www.samsung.com/us/tablets/tab-s8/

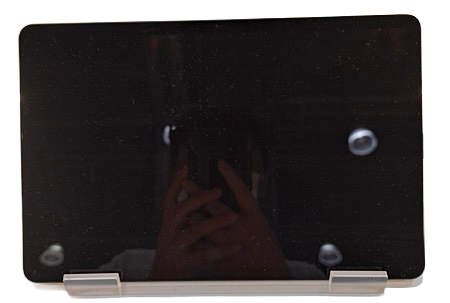
Front of the Samsung Galaxy Tab S8

The Samsung Galaxy Tab S8 is a series of Android-based tablet computers developed and marketed by Samsung Electronics, as part of its flagship Galaxy Tab S series. Unveiled at Samsung's Galaxy Unpacked event on 9 February 2022, alongside the Galaxy S22 series, they serve as the successor to the Galaxy Tab S7 series, and were succeeded by the Galaxy Tab S9 series, which was announced on July 26, 2023.

The Samsung Galaxy Tab S8 series are notable for its introduction of the Ultra variant, the third and largest variant, with a 14.6 inch display with the same 16:10 aspect ratio as other models, and the slimmest bezels of the series, and also has a 2.8ms touch response time for its included S Pen and includes 2 front-facing cameras in the small notch on its display.

== History ==
The Samsung Galaxy Tab S8, the S8+ and the S8 Ultra were announced on 9 February 2022 and released on 25 February 2022.

== Design ==
=== Colors ===
==== Tab S8 and S8+ ====
Color	Name	Bezel
	Graphite	Black
	Silver	Black
	Pink Gold	Black

==== Tab S8 Ultra ====
Color	Name	Bezel
	Graphite	Black

== Specifications ==
=== Hardware ===
==== Chipset ====
All tablets feature a Qualcomm Snapdragon 8 Gen 1 system on a chip. The SoC is based on the 4 nm processing technology node. The tablets also feature an Adreno 730 GPU.

==== Storage ====
The Galaxy Tab S8 and Tab S8+ are available in 128, and 256 GB options, and the Galaxy Tab S8 Ultra is available in 128, 256, and 512 options, not all capacity variants are available. 1 TB of expansion can be added using a microSD card. The base amount of RAM is 8 GB, and is upgradeable to 16 GB.

==== Camera ====
The Tab S8 and Tab S8+ have a 12 MP front camera with an f/2.4 lens. The rear has a 13 MP camera with an f/2.0 wide-angle lens, and a 6 MP camera with a f/2.2 ultra wide angle lens.

The Tab S8 Ultra has a 12 MP front camera with an f/2.2 wide-angle lens, and a 12 MP front camera with an f/2.4 ultra wide angle lens. The rear has a 13 MP camera with an f/2.0 wide-angle lens, and a 6 MP camera with an f/2.2 ultra wide angle lens.

==== Display ====
The Tab S8 is equipped with a TFT LCD with an 11-inch 2560 x 1600 resolution, with a screen ratio of 16:10. The scanning rate can be adjusted from 48 Hz to 120 Hz.

The Tab S8+ features a super AMOLED display with a resolution of 2800 x 1752 in 12.4 inches, with a screen ratio of 16:10. The scanning rate can be adjusted from 48 Hz to 120 Hz.

The Tab S8 Ultra is equipped with a super AMOLED display with a resolution of 2960 x 1848 measuring 14.6 inches, with a screen ratio of 16:10. The scanning rate can be adjusted from 48 Hz to 120 Hz.

=== Software ===
The tablets were released with Android 12 and One UI 4.1. Samsung has promised 4 Android OS upgrades and 5 years of security updates to the Galaxy Tab S8 series (meaning support may end in 2027).

The first commercial OS upgrade, One UI 5.0, was released on November 14, 2022. On May 10, 2024, the One UI 6.1 update was released in more than 29 European and Middle East countries. On April 28, 2025, Samsung began rolling out the One UI 7 update to all devices, which included a completely revamped setup UI backported from the Galaxy S25 series. In addition, also integrated Galaxy AI across supported devices. On October 16, 2025, Samsung released the One UI 8 update based on Android 16, making it the last major OS update for the series.

== Gallery ==
Samsung Galaxy Tab S8 Ultra

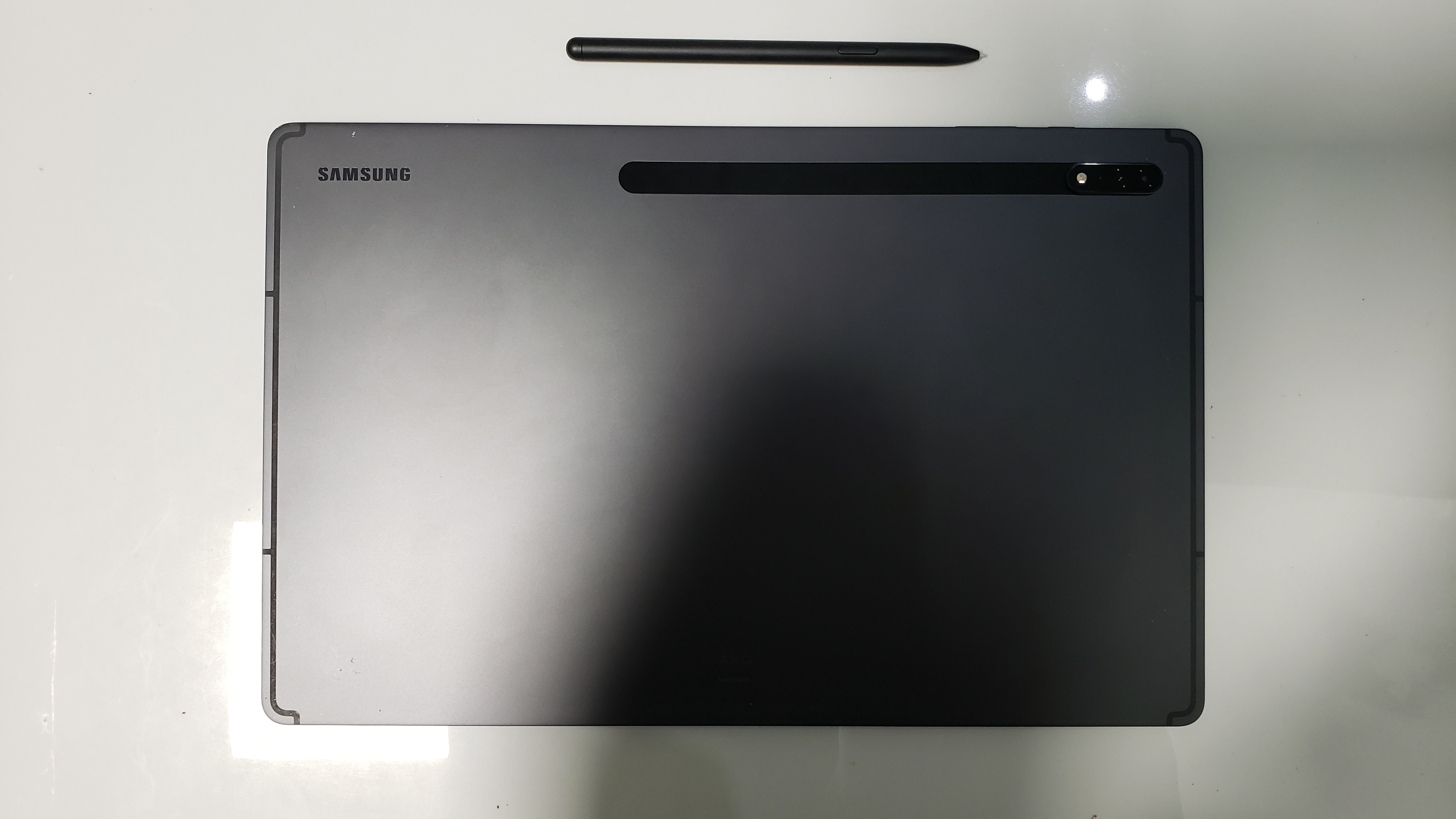
Rear side of the tablet and its included S Pen

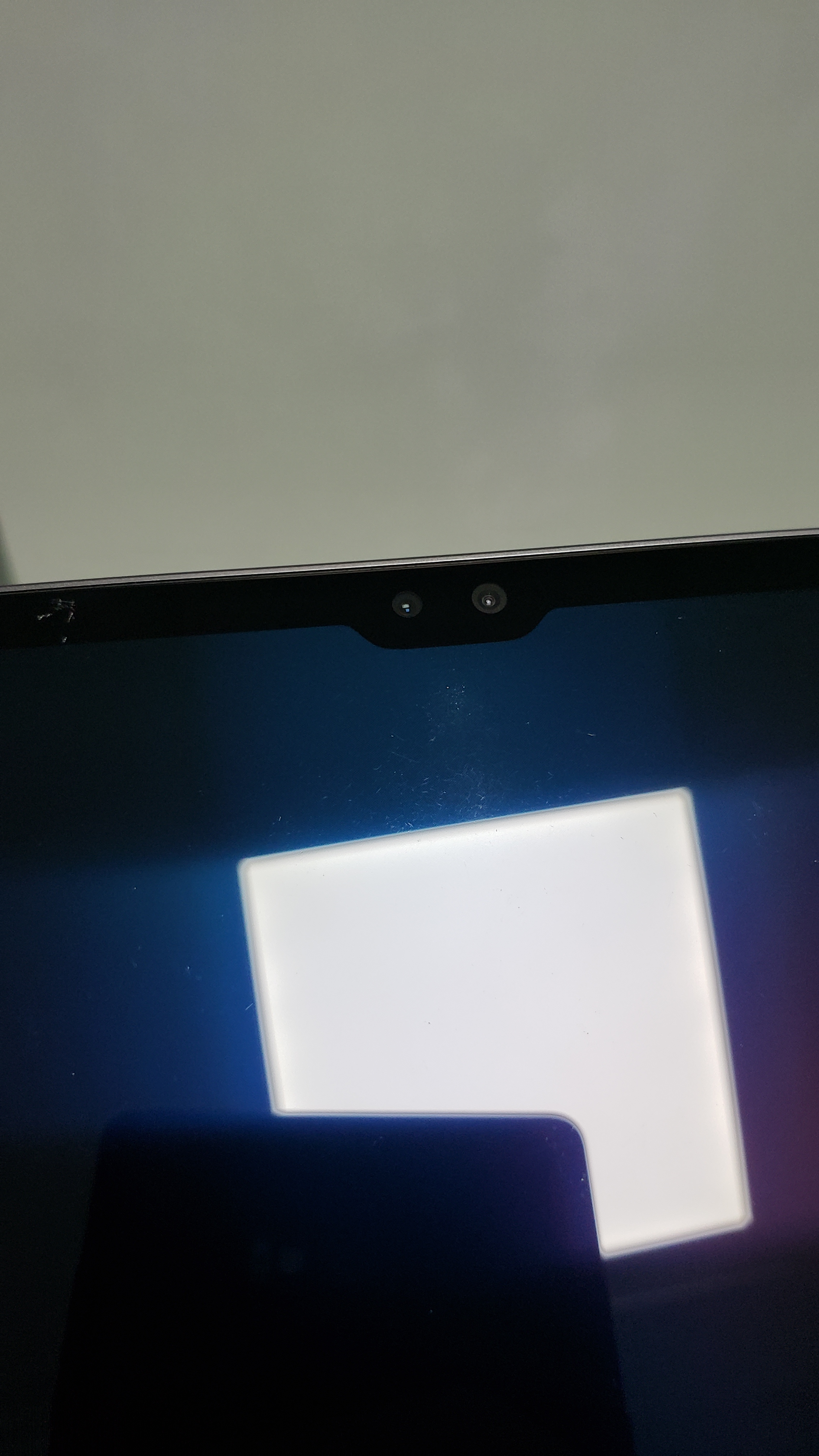
The 2 front-facing cameras inside the notch

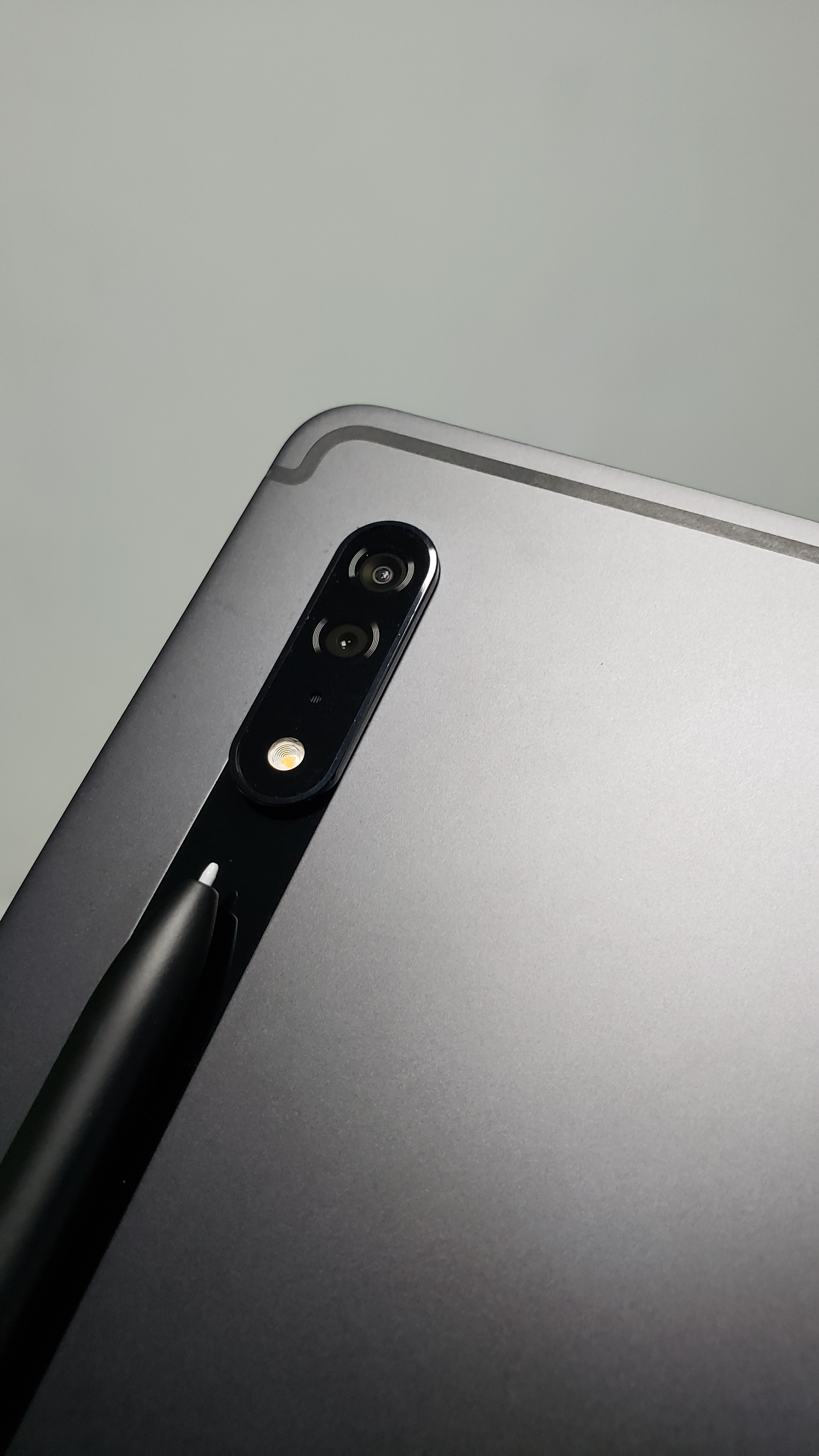
The rear cameras, rear microphone, flashlight, and magnitized S Pen holder

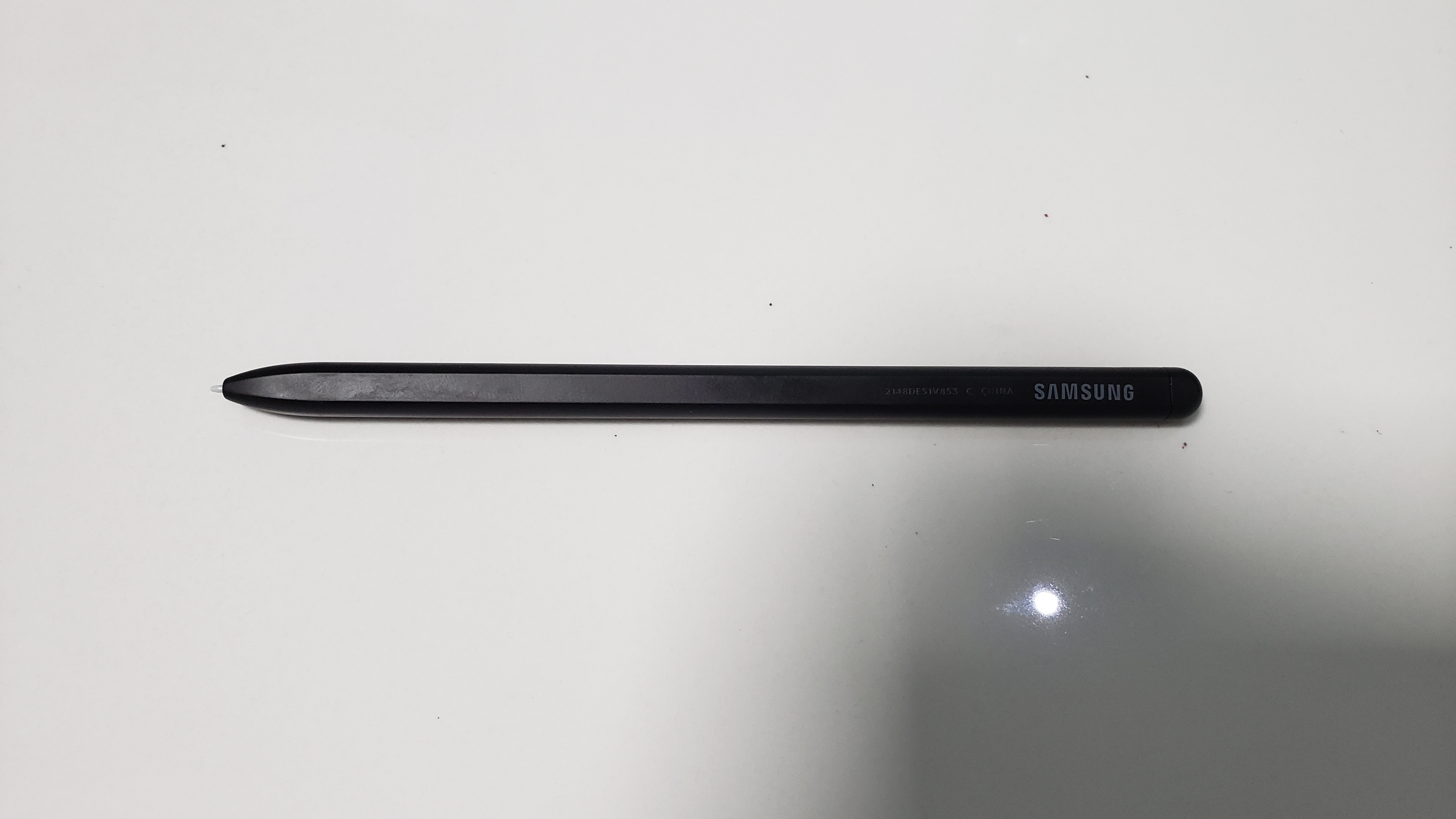
Front side of the included S Pen of the tablet

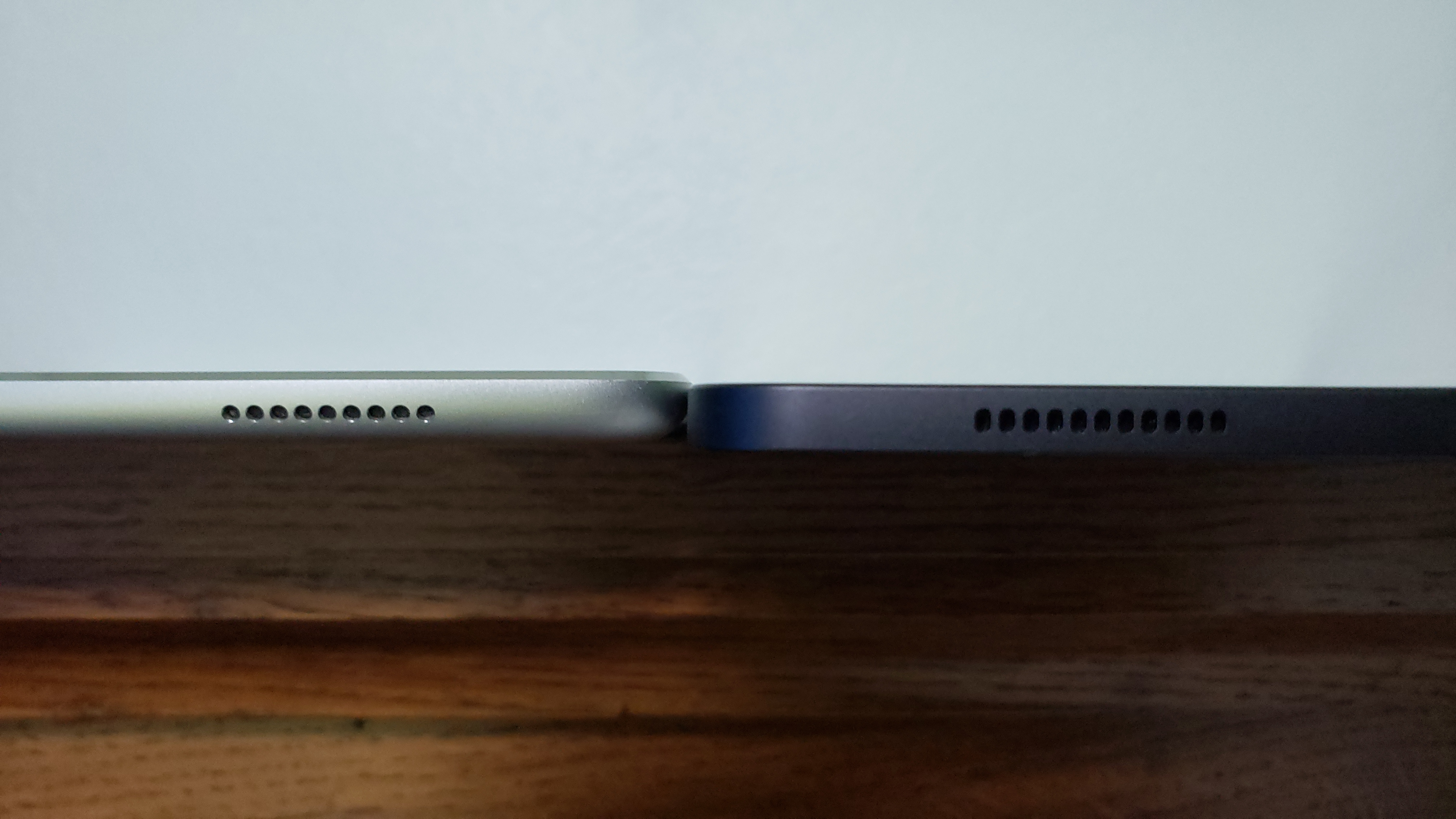
Thickness of the 5.5mm Galaxy Tab S8 Ultra (right) with the 6.9mm iPad Pro 12.9 1st generation (left) for comparison

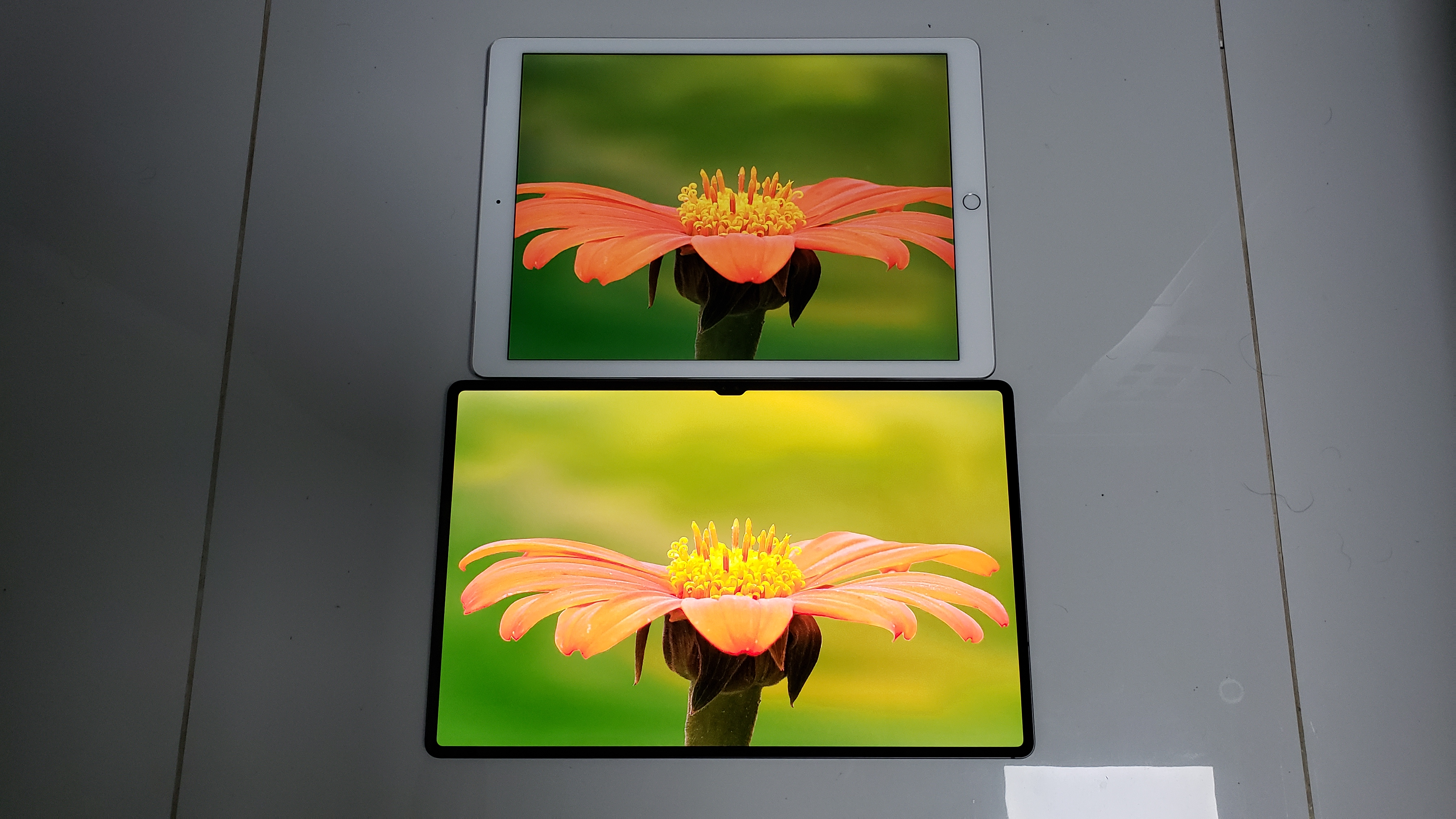
Comparison of the Galaxy Tab S8 Ultra's and iPad Pro 12.9 1st generation's size and display brightness

== Regions ==
Starting with the Galaxy Tab S8 series, the CSC codes are consolidated together. This means that Samsung will speed up the firmware update process for these devices in more regions. Fewer Country Specific Codes (CSCs) means that official Samsung software updates will reach local markets faster.

Some countries on this list may be shown separately during the initial setup process.

=== OXM ===
This CSC group applies to the rest of the world. These CSC codes will work for all variants unless specified.

Regions/carriers marked with an asterisk (*) cannot be used with the Call and Text on Other Devices feature.

==== South Korea ====
Wi-Fi only variants sold in this market do not have any carrier-specific CSC codes, but they still use the OXM Multi-CSC for expanded language and region support unlike their cellular counterparts, which use the OKR Multi-CSC.

- KOO: South Korea
  - KT
  - LG Uplus
  - SK Telecom

==== North America ====
Wi-Fi only variants sold in this market do not have any carrier-specific CSC codes, but they still use the OXM Multi-CSC for expanded language and region support unlike their cellular counterparts, which use the OYM/OYN and OYA/OYV Multi-CSCs for the US and Canada, respectively.

- XAC: Canada
  - Bell
  - Fido
  - Freedom Mobile
  - Koodo
  - Rogers
  - Shaw
  - Telus
  - Virgin Plus
- XAR: United States
  - AT&T *
  - T-Mobile
  - US Cellular
  - Verizon *

==== Latin America ====
ZBR is the newly consolidated CSC code for the Latin America region.

- MXO: Mexico
- ZTO: Brazil
- ZBR: All other Latin America regions
  - PEO: Peru
  - ARO: Argentina
  - BVO: Bolivia
  - CHO: Chile
  - COO: Colombia
  - UPO: Paraguay
  - UYO: Uruguay
  - EON: Ecuador
  - GTO: Guatemala
  - TPA: Panama

==== Europe ====
- CPW: Devices sold through the Carphone Warehouse
- EUX/EUY: Europe
  - ATO: Austria
  - AUT: Switzerland
    - Switzerland
    - Liechtenstein
  - BGL: Bulgaria
  - BTU: British Isles
    - United Kingdom
    - Ireland
  - DBT: Germany
  - EUR: Greece
    - Greece
    - Cyprus
  - ITV: Italian Peninsula
    - Italy
    - Malta
    - San Marino
    - Vatican City
  - LUX: Luxembourg
    - Belgium
    - Luxembourg
  - NEE: Nordic Countries
    - Sweden
    - Denmark
    - Finland
    - Norway
    - Iceland
  - PHE: Spain
    - Spain
    - Andorra
  - PHN: Netherlands
  - SEB: Baltic States
    - Estonia
    - Lithuania
    - Latvia
  - SEE: Southeast Europe
    - Serbia
    - Kosovo
    - Bosnia & Herzegovina
    - Albania
    - North Macedonia
    - Montenegro
  - SIO: Yugoslavia
    - Croatia
    - Slovenia
  - TPH: Portugal
  - ROM: Romania
  - XEF: French Peninsula
    - France
    - Monaco
  - XEH: Hungary
  - XEO: Poland
  - XEZ: Czechia
  - XSK: Slovakia

==== CIS ====
- SEK: Ukraine and Moldova
  - Vodafone
  - Kyivstar
  - Lifecell
  - TriMob
  - Moldcell
  - Orange
- SER: Russia and Belarus
  - MTS
  - Beeline
  - Megafon
  - Tele2
  - A1
  - Life
- CAU: Caucasus countries
  - Georgia
    - Magticom
    - Silknet
    - Beeline
  - Armenia
    - Ucom
    - Viva-MTS
    - Beeline (Telecom Armenia)
  - Azerbaijan
    - Azercell
    - Bakcell
    - Nar Mobile
    - Naxtel
- SKZ: Kazakhstan
  - Beeline
  - Altel
  - Kcell
  - Tele2

==== Middle East & North Africa ====
XSG, previously only for the UAE, now serves the entire Middle East region.

- ACR: Ghana (5G only)
- AFR: Kenya (5G only)
- DKR: Senegal (5G only)
- ECT: Nigeria (5G only)
- EGY: Egypt (5G only)
- ILO: Israel
  - ILP: Palestine (5G only)
- KSA: Saudi Arabia (5G only)
- MWD: Morocco (5G only)
- SKZ: Kazakhstan (5G only)
- TUN: Tunisia (5G only)
- TUR: Turkey
- XFA: South Africa (5G only)
  - XFV: Vodafone/Vodacom
- XFE: Southern Africa (5G only)
- XSG: All other Middle East regions
  - XSG: Arabian Peninsula
    - United Arab Emirates
    - Qatar
    - Kuwait
    - Bahrain
    - Oman
  - MID: Fertile Crescent
    - Jordan
    - Lebanon
    - Iraq
    - Syria

==== India ====
- INS: India
- SLK: Sri Lanka (5G only)

==== Asia Pacific ====
XSP, previously only for Singapore, now serves the Asia Pacific region (Southeast Asia & Oceania). The display languages for Lao, Burmese, and Khmer are still exclusive to this market, even though they are present on the firmware.

The region locking for the Wi-Fi only variant now adds Australia and New Zealand to the Asia Pacific region.

- XSP: Asia Pacific
  - XME: Malaysia
  - XSA: Australia
    - TEL: Telstra
  - XNZ: New Zealand
  - XTC: Philippines
  - Mainland Southeast Asia (Indochinese Peninsula)
    - THL: Thailand
    - CAL: Cambodia & Laos
    - MYM: Myanmar
  - Maritime Southeast Asia (Malay Archipelago)
    - XSP: Singapore & Brunei
      - MM1: M1 Mobile
      - SIN: SingTel
      - STH: Star Hub
    - XXV: Vietnam

==== China ====
- BRI: Taiwan
- TGY: Hong Kong & Macau

=== Notes ===
- As with previous tablets, in most regions, the Call and Text on Other Devices feature can only be activated with a mobile phone issued from a mobile operator within the same region that the tablet was purchased from. Calls totaling five minutes or longer need to be placed before mobile phones from other regions can be used.
