= Samsung Galaxy Tab S2 9.7 =

Android tablet by Samsung

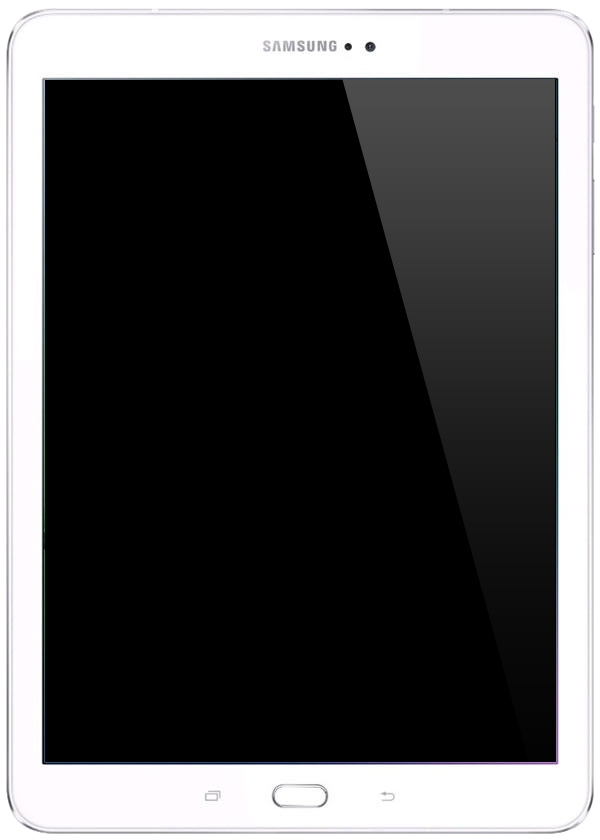
- Samsung Galaxy Tab S2 9.7 in White
- Also known as: SM-T810 (Wi-Fi only); SM-T815x, SM-T817x (3G/LTE & Wi-Fi; last letter varies by carrier & international models)
- Manufacturer: Samsung Electronics
- Product family: Galaxy Tab, Galaxy S
- Type: Tablet computer
- Released: 3 September 2015; 10 years ago
- Operating system: Android 5.0.2 "Lollipop" with TouchWiz Noble UX; Upgradable to Android 7.0 "Nougat" with Samsung Experience 8.0
- System on a chip: Exynos 7 Octa 5433, Snapdragon 652
- CPU: 1.9 GHz quad-core Cortex-A72 + 1.3 GHz quad-core ARM Cortex-A53 (big.LITTLE)
- Memory: 3 GB
- Storage: 32 or 64 GB GB flash memory, microSDXC slot (up to 128 GB)
- Display: 2048×1536 px (QXGA) Super AMOLED display (RGB S Stripe) (264 ppi), 9.7 in (25 cm) diagonal
- Graphics: ARM Mali T760MP6 @ 700MHz/ Adreno 510
- Sound: Built-in stereo
- Input: Multi-touch screen, fingerprint scanner, digital compass, proximity and ambient light sensors, accelerometer
- Camera: 8.0 MP AF rear-facing camera, 2.1 MP front-facing camera
- Connectivity: Wi-Fi 802.11a/b/g/n/ac (2.4 & 5GHz), Bluetooth 4.1; 4G & Wi-Fi model: 4G/LTE, GPS
- Power: 5,870 mAh Li-ion
- Dimensions: 237.3 mm (9.34 in) H 169 mm (6.7 in) W 5.6 mm (0.22 in) D
- Weight: 389 g (0.858 lb)
- Predecessor: Samsung Galaxy Tab S 10.5; Samsung Galaxy Tab S 8.4
- Successor: Samsung Galaxy Tab A 10.1; Samsung Galaxy Tab S3
- Website: www.samsung.com/global/galaxy/galaxy-tab-s2/

The Samsung Galaxy Tab S2 9.7 is an Android-based tablet computer produced and marketed by Samsung Electronics. Belonging to the high-end "S" line, it was announced on 20 July 2015 and was released in September 2015 along with the Samsung Galaxy Tab S2 8.0. It is available in Wi-Fi only and Wi-Fi/4G LTE variants.

== History ==
The Galaxy Tab S2 9.7 was announced on 20 July 2015 from a Samsung press release.

== Features ==
The device runs Android 5.1.1 Lollipop with Samsung's TouchWiz software suite. An update to Android 6.0.1 Marshmallow was released in June 2016. The Android 7.0 update rollout began in April 2017 but the Galaxy Tab S2 9.7 did not officially receive Android 7 Nougat with it only reaching Android 6.1 Marshmallow. The Galaxy Tab S2 9.7 is available in a Wi-Fi-only and a 4G/LTE cellular model that is also capable of connecting to Wi-Fi. It has 16 GB, 32 GB or 64 GB of eMMC 5.0 or 5.1 internal storage depending on the model, with a microSDXC card slot for expansion up to 128 GB. It has a 3GB RAM capacity for decent computing. The display is a Super AMOLED (4:3) screen with a resolution of 2048x1536 pixels. It also features a 2.1 MP front-facing camera and an 8.0 MP AF rear-facing camera without LED flash. It also has the ability to record 1440p videos at 30fps. The hardware home button serves as the fingerprint sensor.

The Galaxy Tab S2 9.7 takes design cues from the 2014 Galaxy Note 4 and 2015 Galaxy A series phones because the device has a painted metal frame with chamfered edges and a plastic back, along with a camera design similar to the Galaxy S6 It is available in black, white, or gold/beige colors. At 5.6mm thick, the Tab S2 9.7 is, as of September 2022, still one of the world's thinnest tablets together with the smaller screen Samsung Galaxy Tab S2 8.0.

== See also ==
- Comparison of tablet computers
- Samsung Galaxy Tab series
- Samsung Galaxy S series
