= Samsung Galaxy Tab S2 8.0 =

Android tablet by Samsung

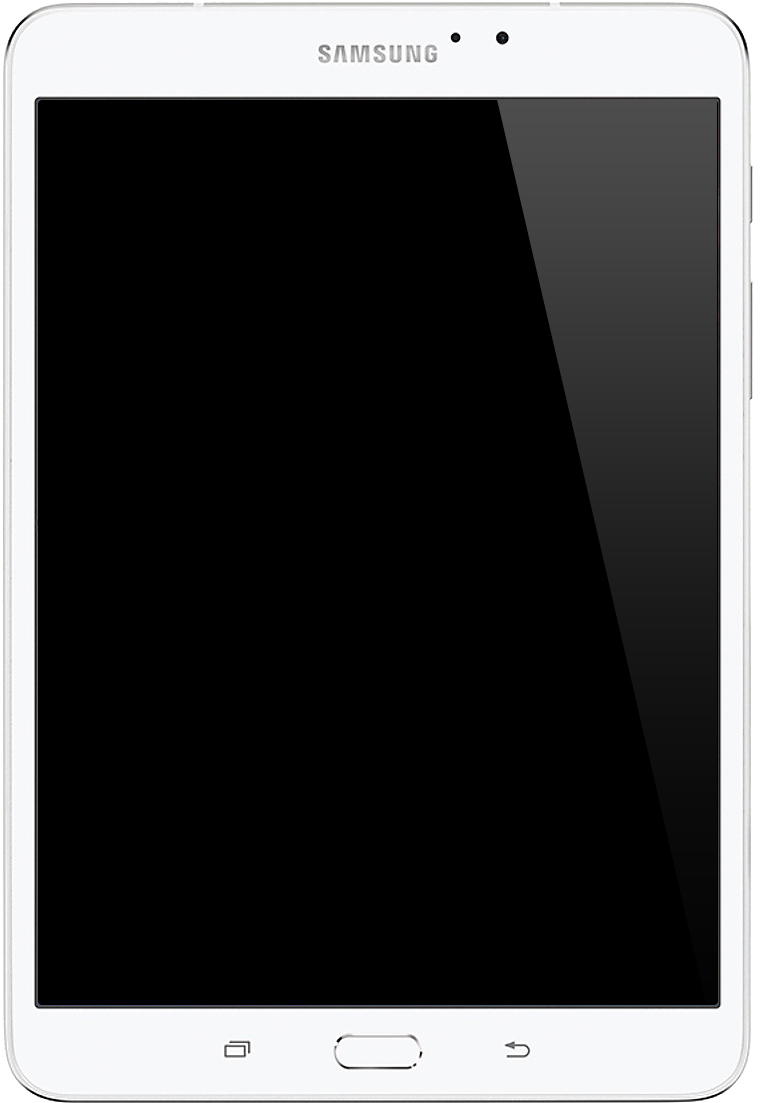
- Samsung Galaxy Tab S2 8.0 in white
- Manufacturer: Samsung Electronics
- Product family: Galaxy Tab, Galaxy S
- Type: Tablet computer
- Released: September 3, 2015; 10 years ago
- Introductory price: $399
- Operating system: Android 5.0.2 "Lollipop" with TouchWiz Noble UX; Upgradable to Android 7.0 "Nougat" with Samsung Experience 8.0
- System on a chip: Exynos 7 Octa 5433 Qualcomm Snapdragon 652 2016 refresh model
- CPU: 1.9 GHz quad-core Cortex-A57 + 1.3 GHz quad-core ARM Cortex-A53 (big.LITTLE) 1.8 GHz quad-core Cortex-A72 + 1.4 GHz quad-core ARM Cortex-A53 (big.LITTLE) 2016 refresh model
- Memory: 3 GB
- Storage: 32 or 64 GB GB flash memory, microSDXC slot (up to 128 GB)
- Display: 2048×1536 px (QXGA) Super AMOLED display (RGBG PenTile) (320 ppi), 8.0 in (20 cm) diagonal
- Graphics: ARM Mali T760MP6 @ 700MHz Adreno 510 (2016 refresh model)
- Sound: Built-in stereo
- Input: Multi-touch screen, fingerprint scanner, digital compass, proximity and ambient light sensors, accelerometer
- Camera: 8.0 MP AF rear-facing camera, 2.1 MP front-facing camera
- Connectivity: Wi-Fi 802.11a/b/g/n/ac (2.4 & 5GHz), Bluetooth 4.1; 4G & WiFi model: 4G/LTE, GPS
- Power: 4,000 mAh Li-ion
- Dimensions: 198.6 mm (7.82 in) H 134.8 mm (5.31 in) W 5.6 mm (0.22 in) D
- Weight: 265 g (0.584 lb)
- Predecessor: Samsung Galaxy Tab S 8.4; Samsung Galaxy Tab Pro 8.4; Samsung Galaxy Tab 4 8.0; Samsung Galaxy Tab 4 7.0
- Successor: Samsung Galaxy Tab S3
- Related: Samsung Galaxy Tab A 9.7; Samsung Galaxy Tab A 8.0; Samsung Galaxy Tab S2 9.7
- Website: www.samsung.com/global/galaxy/galaxy-tab-s2/

The Samsung Galaxy Tab S2 8.0 is an Android-based tablet computer produced and marketed by Samsung Electronics. Belonging to the high-end "S" line, it was announced on 20 July 2015 and was released on September 3, 2015 along with the Galaxy Tab S2 9.7. It is available in Wi-Fi only and Wi-Fi/4G LTE variants.

== History ==
The Galaxy Tab S2 8.0 was announced on July 20, 2015 from a Samsung press release.

The computer tablet was released on September 3, 2015 at $399.

A refreshed model series was released in late 2016 (UK early 2017),(Tab S2 VE, SM-T710/715/719) replacing the older Exynos 5433 SoC with an newer Snapdragon 652 SoC. Besides some minor software changes and Android 7.x, it is mostly the same as the previous model.

== Features ==
The device runs Android 5.1.1 Lollipop with Samsung's TouchWiz software suite. An update to Android 6.0.1 Marshmallow was released in June 2016. The Android 7.0 update rollout began in April 2017. The Galaxy Tab S2 8.0 is available in WiFi-only and 4G/LTE & WiFi variants. Storage ranges from 32 GB to 64 GB depending on the model, with a microSDXC card slot for expansion up to 128 GB. The display is a Super AMOLED (4:3) screen with a resolution of 2048x1536 pixels. It also features a 2.1 MP front-facing camera and an 8.0 MP AF rear-facing camera without LED flash. It also has the ability to record HD videos. The hardware home button serves as the fingerprint sensor.

The Galaxy Tab S2 8.0 takes design cues from the 2015 Galaxy A series phones because the device has a painted metal frame with chamfered edges and a plastic back, along with a camera design similar to the Galaxy S6. It is available in black, white, or gold/beige colors. At 5.6mm thick, the Tab S2 8.0 is, as of September 2015, the world's thinnest tablet together with the bigger screen Galaxy Tab S2 9.7.

== See also ==
- Comparison of tablet computers
- Samsung Galaxy Tab series
- Samsung Galaxy S series
- Samsung Galaxy A series
