= Samsung Galaxy Tab S3 =

Android-based tablet by Samsung

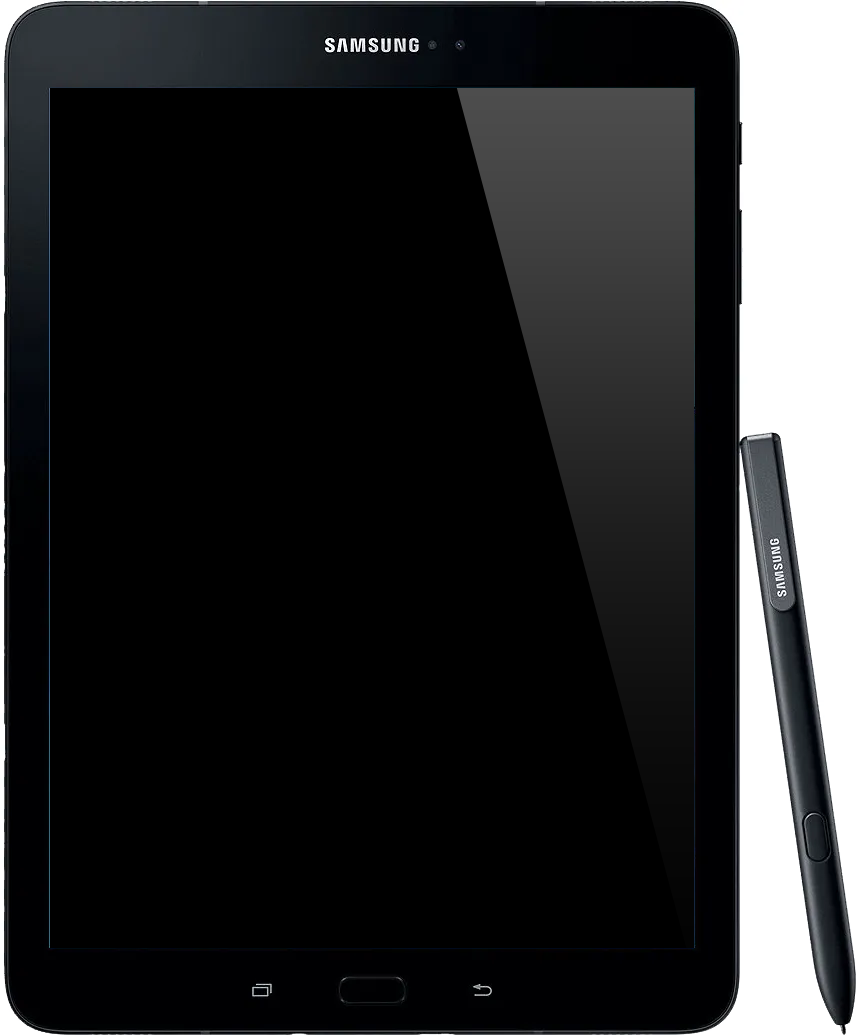
- Galaxy Tab S3 with S Pen
- Brand: Samsung
- Manufacturer: Samsung Electronics
- Type: Tablet computer
- Series: Galaxy Tab S
- Family: Samsung Galaxy
- First released: 24 March 2017 (US & Canada); 31 March 2017 (UK) - Silver; 7 April 2017 (UK) - Black; 17 April 2017 (Germany, Russia); 1 May 2017 (China); 8 May 2017 (Taiwan); 11 May 2017 (South Korea); 1 June 2017 (Malaysia)
- Predecessor: Samsung Galaxy Tab S2 9.7; Samsung Galaxy Tab S2 8.0
- Successor: Samsung Galaxy Tab S4
- Related: Samsung Galaxy Note 10.1 2014 Edition; Samsung Galaxy Note 7 Samsung Galaxy Note FE
- Compatible networks: GSM / HSPA / LTE
- Form factor: Slate
- Colors: Black, Silver
- Weight: Wi-Fi: 429 g (0.946 lb); LTE & Wi-Fi: 434 g (0.957 lb)
- Operating system: Original: Android 7.0 "Nougat" with Samsung Experience 8.0; Current: Android 9 "Pie" with One UI 1.1
- System-on-chip: Qualcomm Snapdragon 820
- CPU: Quad-core (2x2.15 GHz Kryo + 2x1.6 GHz Kryo)
- GPU: Adreno 530
- Storage: 32 GB; 128 GB
- Removable storage: microSDXC card, up to 128 GB
- SIM: Nano-SIM
- Battery: 6,000 mAh
- Rear camera: 13 MP, f/1.9, 27mm (wide), AF
- Front camera: 5 MP, f/2.2, 23mm (wide)
- Display: 9.7 in (250 mm) Super AMOLED 2048 x 1536 pixels (~264 ppi), 4:3 aspect ratio
- Sound: Four built-in stereo speakers tuned by AKG
- Connectivity: Wi-Fi 802.11a/b/g/n/ac (2.4 & 5GHz), Bluetooth 4.2; 4G & WiFi model: 4G/LTE, GPS
- Data inputs: Multi-touch screen; fingerprint scanner; digital compass; proximity; ambient light sensors; accelerometer
- Model: SM-T820 (Wi-Fi); SM-T825x (Wi-Fi & LTE); SM-T827x (Wi-Fi & LTE) (Last letter varies by carrier and international models)
- Website: www.samsung.com/global/galaxy/galaxy-tab-s3/

The Samsung Galaxy Tab S3 is an Android-based tablet computer produced and marketed by Samsung Electronics. Belonging to the high-end "S" line, it was unveiled alongside the Galaxy Book at the MWC 2017, and was first released on March 24, 2017. It was available in Wi-Fi only and Wi-Fi/4G LTE variants.

Its successor, the Galaxy Tab S4, was announced on August 1, 2018.

== Features ==
The Galaxy Tab S3 is the first device from Samsung to run Android 7.0 Nougat as default. For the first time since the Galaxy Tab 2, all the languages that were previously absent from other regions are available.

The device features a 9.7-inch 2048 × 1536 Super AMOLED display which supports HDR video. The Tab S3 has a Qualcomm Snapdragon 820 processor, 4 GB of RAM, 32 GB of onboard storage and a 6000 mAh battery. It is also supplied with a Galaxy Note S Pen, the first of the Tab S range to do so.

== Reception ==
The Verge criticized the cameras on the device, being "softened and smudged", the limitations on multitasking, and the cramped Pogo keyboard, whilst praising the integration of the S Pen and it being lightweight.

Matt Swider of Tech Radar stated that the tablet was "Samsung’s best tablet design yet", praising the addition of the free S-Pen stylus and HDR-ready future-proofed screen while criticizing the costly keyboard and how a tablet "could not replace a laptop".

Xiaomare Blanco of CNET also called the device Samsung's best tablet and stated, "The Samsung Galaxy Tab S3 is an elegantly designed tablet that comes with a capable stylus. It has a stunning AMOLED screen, fingerprint sensor for extra security and satisfyingly loud quad speakers. It's also the first HDR-ready tablet." The reviewer was also disappointed that large applications take time to load, while the keyboard add-on is an expensive extra.

Max Parker of TrustedReviews noted the good addition of the HDR AMOLED display, S Pen and lightweight, but said that the software "lacks polish", "janky" multitasking on the device and that the glass back of the tablet was a "fingerprint magnet".
