= Samsung Galaxy Tab S 10.5 =

Android tablet by Samsung

- Also known as: SM-T800 (WiFi); SM-T805 (3G, 4G/LTE & WiFi); SM-T807 (3G, 4G/LTE & WiFi); SM-T807P (Sprint CDMA); SM-T807V (Verizon CDMA)
- Manufacturer: Samsung Electronics
- Product family: Galaxy Tab, Galaxy S
- Type: Tablet computer
- Released: June 27, 2014
- Operating system: Android 4.4.2 "KitKat"; Upgradable to Android 6.0.1 "Marshmallow" with TouchWiz
- System on a chip: Qualcomm Snapdragon 800 (SM-T807P/V); Samsung Exynos 5420 Octa; Samsung Exynos 5433 Octa (SM-T805K/L/S)
- CPU: 2.3 GHz quad-core Krait 400 SoC processor 1.9 Ghz A15 Quad + 1.3 Ghz A7 Quad octa-core
- Memory: 3 GB
- Storage: 16/32 GB flash memory, microSDXC slot (up to 128 GB)
- Display: 2560×1600 px (288 ppi), 10.5 in (270 mm) diagonal, WQXGA Super AMOLED display(RGB S-Stripe)
- Graphics: Adreno 330, ARM MALI T628
- Input: Multi-touch screen, finger scanner, digital compass, proximity and ambient light sensors, accelerometer
- Camera: 8.0 MP AF rear-facing with LED flash, 2.1 MP front-facing
- Connectivity: Cat3 100 Mbps DL, 50 Mbps UP Hexa-Band 800/850/900/1800/2100/2600 (4G/LTE model); HSDPA 42.2 Mbit/s, (4G/LTE & WiFi model); HSUPA 5.76 Mbit/s 850/900/1900/2100 (4G/LTE & WiFi model); EDGE/GPRS Quad 850/900/1800/1900 (4G/LTE & WiFi model); Wi-Fi 802.11a/b/g/n/ac (2.4 & 5GHz), Bluetooth 4.0, HDMI (external cable), GPS
- Power: 7,900 mAh Li-ion battery
- Dimensions: 247.3 mm (9.74 in) H 177.3 mm (6.98 in) W 6.6 mm (0.26 in) D
- Weight: WiFi: 465 g (1.025 lb); 4G/LTE: 467 g (1.030 lb)
- Predecessor: Samsung Galaxy Tab 4 10.1; Samsung Galaxy Tab Pro 10.1; Samsung Galaxy Note 10.1 2014 Edition
- Successor: Samsung Galaxy Tab S2 9.7
- Related: Samsung Galaxy Tab S 8.4
- Website: www.samsung.com/global/microsite/galaxytabs/specs.html

The Samsung Galaxy Tab S 10.5 is a 10.5-inch Android-based tablet computer produced and marketed by Samsung Electronics. It belongs to the ultra high-end "S" line of the cross between the Samsung Galaxy Tab and Samsung Galaxy S series, which also includes an 8.4-inch model, the Samsung Galaxy Tab S 8.4. It was announced on 12 June 2014, and was released in July 2014. This is Samsung's first 10.5-inch tablet which is aimed to be a direct competitor against the iPad Air.

== History ==
The Galaxy Tab S 10.5 was announced on 12 June 2014. It was shown along with the Galaxy Tab S 8.4 at the Samsung Galaxy Premiere 2014 in New York.

== Features ==
The Galaxy Tab S 10.5 was released with Android 4.4.2 KitKat. Samsung has customized the interface with its TouchWiz Nature UX 3.0 software. As well as the standard suite of Google Apps, it has Samsung apps such as ChatON, S Suggest, S Voice, S Translator, S Planner, WatchON, Smart Stay, Multi-Window, Group Play, All Share Play, Samsung Magazine, Professional pack, multi-user mode, SideSync 3.0, and Gear/Gear Fit manager.

The Galaxy Tab S 10.5 is available in WiFi-only and 4G/LTE & WiFi variants. Storage ranges from 16 GB to 32 GB depending on the model, with a microSDXC card slot for expansion up to 128 GB. It has a 10.5-inch WQXGA Super AMOLED screen with a resolution of 2560x1600 pixels and a pixel density of 287 ppi. It also features a 2.1 MP front camera without flash and a rear-facing 8.0 MP AF camera with LED flash. It can also record HD videos.

The Galaxy Tab S was designed with a ‘Multi Window’ feature that lets users consume two kinds of entertainment on one screen (two-screen technology), for example when running two apps simultaneously such as a video and social media application.

The WiFi model of the tablet is powered by the Samsung Exynos 5 Octa 5420 CPUs. The LTE model comes either with a Quad-core 2.3 GHz Krait 400 on top of a Qualcomm Snapdragon 800 chipset (version for Sprint and Verizon) or with the Exynos octa-core CPU. Models for South Korean domestic market have upgraded Exynos 7 Octa 5433 CPUs.

=== Updates ===
Galaxy Tab S 10.5 WiFi received Android 5.0.2 Lollipop in France and Canada on March 17, 2015. As of April 6, 2015, only Canada and France have received the OTA (Over the Air) Update, exclusive to the WiFi only model. Reasons for the two countries getting the update first, could include the high sales of the Tab S tablets in both countries, and the fact that 5.0.2 adds additional French language support, a language predominantly spoken fluently by some 60 million French and 10 million Canadians.

Samsung has announced that the Samsung Galaxy Tab S 10.5 4G/LTE with an OTA Android 5.0 Lollipop update would be released in some European countries during the last half of April. These countries included Slovenia, Greece, the Czech Republic, Croatia and Switzerland.

From June 2015 the tablet received an update to Lollipop in Italy.

As of October 2015, Android 5.0.2 rolled out to the United States as well.

The Galaxy Tab S lineup got an upgrade to Android 6.0.1 Marshmallow OTA. The update for the 10.5 variant began on August 26, 2016, for all versions, except any Canadians LTE models (SM-T805W), to which there will not likely be an update to Marshmallow.

=== Third-Party Updates ===
LineageOS 14.1 (based on Android 7.0 Nougat) is available for the Galaxy Tab S 10.5 Wi-Fi.

== Reception ==
The Verge praised the AMOLED display, liked that it is thinner than the iPad Air, and found the Multi-Window software feature useful. However, The Verge did not like the plastic body, numerous confusing software features, and the hard-to-use fingerprint sensor.

== See also ==
- Comparison of tablet computers
- Samsung Galaxy Tab series
- Samsung Galaxy S series
