= Samsung Galaxy Tab S 8.4 =

Android tablet by Samsung

- Also known as: SM-T700 (WiFi); SM-T705 (3G, 4G/LTE & WiFi); SM-T707V (Verizon CDMA)
- Manufacturer: Samsung Electronics
- Product family: Galaxy Tab; Galaxy S
- Type: Tablet computer
- Released: 2 July 2014; 12 years ago
- Operating system: Android 4.4.2 "KitKat"; Upgradable to Android 6.0.1 "Marshmallow" with TouchWiz
- System on a chip: Qualcomm Snapdragon 800 (Verizon CDMA); Samsung Exynos 5 Octa 5420
- Memory: 3 GB
- Storage: 16/32 GB flash memory, microSDXC slot (up to 128 GB)
- Display: 2560x1600 px (359 ppi), 8.4 in (21 cm) diagonal, WQXGA Super AMOLED display (RGBG PenTile)
- Graphics: ARM Mali-T628
- Sound: Built-in stereo
- Input: Multi-touch screen, Finger scanner, digital compass, proximity and ambient light sensors, accelerometer
- Camera: 8.0MP AF rear facing with LED flash, 2.1 MP front facing
- Connectivity: Cat3 100 Mbps DL, 50 Mbps UP Hexa-Band 800/850/900/1800/2100/2600 (4G/LTE model); HSDPA 42.2 Mbit/s, (4G/LTE & WiFi model); HSUPA 5.76 Mbit/s 850/900/1900/2100 (4G/LTE & WiFi model); EDGE/GPRS Quad 850/900/1800/1900 (4G/LTE & WiFi model); Wi-Fi 802.11a/b/g/n/ac (2.4 & 5GHz), Bluetooth 4.0, HDMI (external cable)
- Power: 4,900 mAh Li-Ion battery
- Dimensions: 212.8 mm (8.38 in) H 125.6 mm (4.94 in) W 6.6 mm (0.26 in) D
- Weight: WiFi: 294 g (0.648 lb); 4G/LTE: 298 g (0.657 lb)
- Predecessor: Samsung Galaxy Note 8.0
- Successor: Samsung Galaxy Tab S2 8.0
- Related: Samsung Galaxy Tab S 10.5; Samsung Galaxy Tab Pro 8.4; Samsung Galaxy Tab A
- Website: www.samsung.com/global/microsite/galaxytabs/specs.html

The Samsung Galaxy Tab S 8.4 is an 8.4-inch Android-based tablet computer produced and marketed by Samsung Electronics. It belongs to the ultra high-end "S" line of the cross between the Samsung Galaxy Tab and Samsung Galaxy S series, which also includes a 10.5-inch model, the Samsung Galaxy Tab S 10.5. It was announced on 12 June 2014, and subsequently released on 2 July 2014. It is available in Wi-Fi only and both Wi-Fi and 4G variants. This is Samsung's second 8.4-inch tablet which is aimed to be a direct competitor against the LG G Pad 8.3 and the iPad Mini 2.

== History ==
The Galaxy Tab S 8.4 was announced on 12 June 2014. It was shown along with the Galaxy Tab S 10.5 at the Samsung Galaxy Premier 2014 in New York City.

== Features ==
The Galaxy Tab S 8.4 was released with Android 4.4.2 KitKat. Samsung customized the interface with its TouchWiz Nature UX 3.0 software. As well as the standard suite of Google apps, it includes Samsung apps such as ChatON, S Suggest, S Voice, S Translator, S Planner, WatchON, Smart Stay, Multi-Window, Group Play, All Share Play, Samsung Magazine, Professional pack, multi-user mode and SideSync 3.0.

The Galaxy Tab S 8.4 is available in Wi-Fi-only and 4G/LTE & WiFi variants. Storage ranges from 16 GB to 32 GB depending on the model, with a microSDXC card slot for expansion up to 128 GB. Color options include dazzling white, charcoal gray, and titanium bronze. It has an 8.4-inch Quad HD Super AMOLED (16:10) screen with a resolution of 2560x1600 pixels and a pixel density of 359 ppi. It also features a 2.1 MP front camera without flash and a rear-facing 8.0 MP AF camera with LED flash. It also has the ability to record HD videos.

=== Updates ===
Galaxy Tab S 8.4 WiFi received Android 5.0.2 Lollipop in France and Canada on March 17, 2015. As of April 6, 2015, only Canada and France have received the OTA (Over the Air) update, exclusive to the WiFi only model.

Samsung has announced that the Samsung Galaxy Tab S 8.4 4G/LTE with an OTA Android 5.0 Lollipop update would be released in some European countries during the last half of April. These countries included Slovenia, the Czech Republic, Croatia and Switzerland.

From June 2015 the tablet received an update to Lollipop in Italy.

As of October 2015, Android 5.0.2 rolled out to the United States as well.

The Galaxy Tab S lineup got an upgrade to Android 6.0.1 Marshmallow OTA. The update for the 8.4 variant began on August 26, 2016, for all versions, except any Canadians LTE models, to which there will not likely be an update to Marshmallow.

== See also ==
- Comparison of tablet computers
- Samsung Galaxy Tab series
- Samsung Galaxy S series
- Samsung Galaxy Tab Pro 8.4
