= List of Samsung tablets =

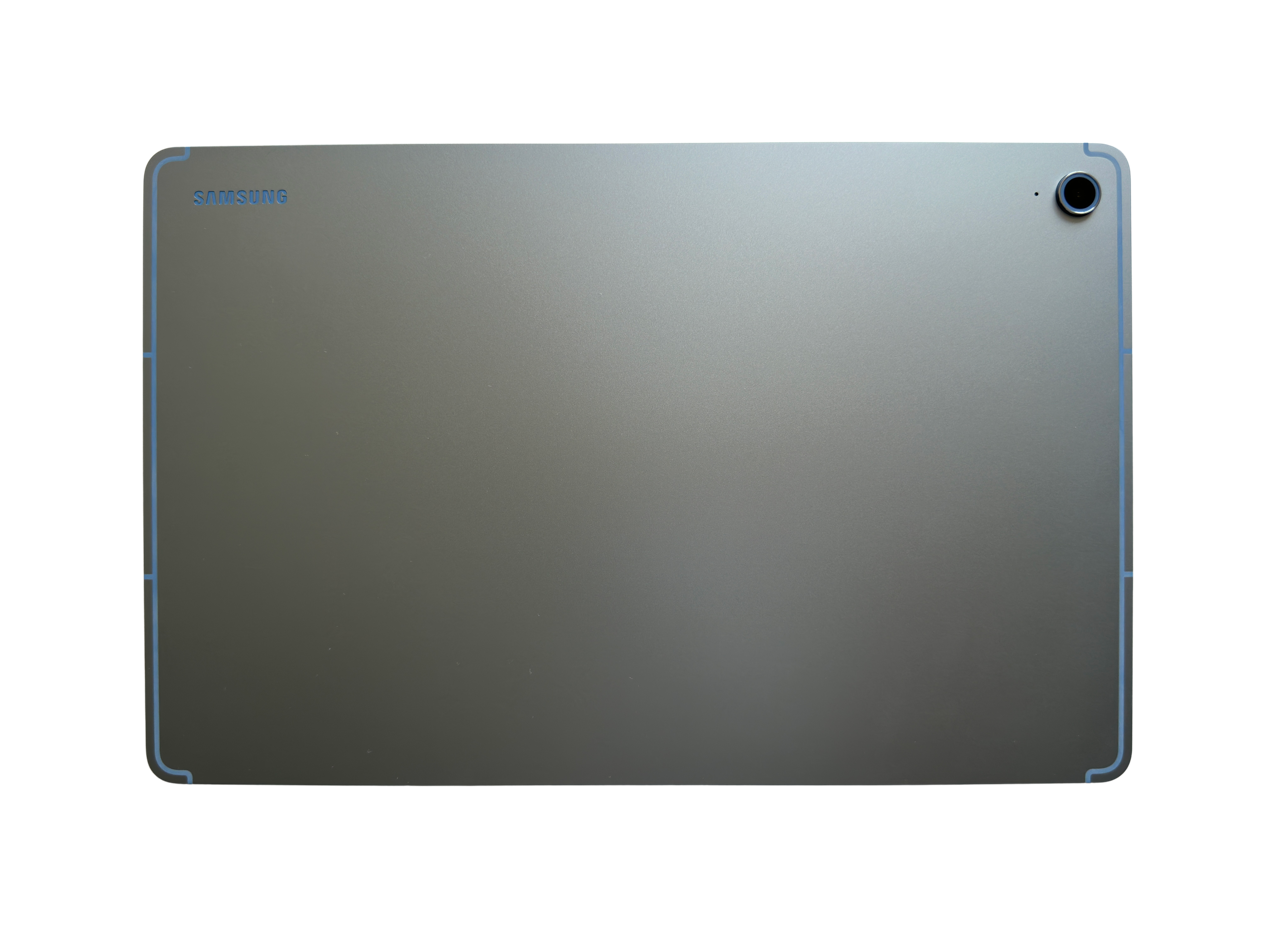
Samsung tablet computer

This is a list of tablets produced by Samsung.

Samsung announced its first tablet, the Android-powered Galaxy Tab 7.0, in September 2010. Since then, it has produced a number of tablets, including the Galaxy Tab series, the Galaxy Book series, and the Galaxy View series. It has also released three tablets under the Galaxy Note moniker, a brand that was also used for releasing a number of smartphones. Samsung has also released a number of co-branded tablets, such as the Nexus 10 (with Google) and a number of Nook-branded Galaxy tablets with Barnes & Noble.

== Mainstream Android tablets ==
=== Flagship tablets ===
- Samsung Galaxy Tab 7.0
- Samsung Galaxy Tab 7.0 Plus
- Samsung Galaxy Tab 7.7
- Samsung Galaxy Tab 8.9
- Samsung Galaxy Tab 10.1
- Samsung Galaxy Tab 2 7.0
- Samsung Galaxy Tab 2 10.1
- Samsung Galaxy Tab 3 7.0
- Samsung Galaxy Tab 3 8.0
- Samsung Galaxy Tab 3 10.1
- Samsung Galaxy Tab 4 7.0
- Samsung Galaxy Tab 4 8.0
- Samsung Galaxy Tab 4 10.1
- Samsung Galaxy Note 8.0
- Samsung Galaxy Note 10.1
- Samsung Galaxy Note 10.1 2014 Edition
- Samsung Galaxy Note Pro 12.2
- Samsung Galaxy Tab Pro 8.4
- Samsung Galaxy Tab Pro 10.1
- Samsung Galaxy Tab Pro 12.2
- Samsung Galaxy Tab S 8.4
- Samsung Galaxy Tab S 10.5
- Samsung Galaxy Tab S2 8.0
- Samsung Galaxy Tab S2 9.7
- Samsung Galaxy Tab S3
- Samsung Galaxy Tab S4
- Samsung Galaxy Tab S5e
- Samsung Galaxy Tab S6
- Samsung Galaxy Tab S6 Lite
- Samsung Galaxy Tab S7
- Samsung Galaxy Tab S7+
- Samsung Galaxy Tab S7 FE
- Samsung Galaxy Tab S8
- Samsung Galaxy Tab S8+
- Samsung Galaxy Tab S8 Ultra
- Samsung Galaxy Tab S6 Lite 2022
- Samsung Galaxy Tab S9
- Samsung Galaxy Tab S9+
- Samsung Galaxy Tab S9 Ultra
- Samsung Galaxy Tab S9 FE+
- Samsung Galaxy Tab S6 Lite 2024
- Samsung Galaxy Tab S10+
- Samsung Galaxy Tab S10 Ultra
- Samsung Galaxy Tab S10 FE
- Samsung Galaxy Tab S10 FE+
- Samsung Galaxy Tab S10 Lite
- Samsung Galaxy Tab S11
- Samsung Galaxy Tab S11 Ultra

=== Mid-range rugged tablets ===
- Samsung Galaxy Tab Active
- Samsung Galaxy Tab Active 2
- Samsung Galaxy Tab Active Pro
- Samsung Galaxy Tab Active 3
- Samsung Galaxy Tab Active 4 Pro
- Samsung Galaxy Tab Active 5 Pro

=== Entry-level tablets ===
- Samsung Galaxy Tab 3 Lite 7.0
- Samsung Galaxy Tab E 8.4
- Samsung Galaxy Tab E 10.5
- Samsung Galaxy Tab E 9.6 (T560, T561)
- Samsung Galaxy Tab E 8.0 (T375, T377)
- Samsung Galaxy Tab A 8.0 (2015)
- Samsung Galaxy Tab A 10.1 (2016)
- Samsung Galaxy Tab A 8.0 (2017)
- Samsung Galaxy Tab A 8.0 (2018)
- Samsung Galaxy Tab A 10.5 (2018)
- Samsung Galaxy Tab A 10.1 (2019)
- Samsung Galaxy Tab A 8.0 (2019)
- Samsung Galaxy Tab A 8.0 (2019) Kids
- Samsung Galaxy Tab A 8.4 (2020)
- Samsung Galaxy Tab A7 10.4 (2020)
- Samsung Galaxy Tab A7 Lite (2021)
- Samsung Galaxy Tab A7 Kids Edition (2021)
- Samsung Galaxy Tab A7 Lite Kids Edition (2021)
- Samsung Galaxy Tab A8 (2022)
- Samsung Galaxy Tab A9 (2023)
- Samsung Galaxy Tab A9+ (2023)
- Samsung Galaxy Tab A9 Kids Edition (2024)
- Samsung Galaxy Tab A9+ Kids Edition (2024)
- Samsung Galaxy Tab A11 (2025)
- Samsung Galaxy Tab A11+ (2025)

== Extra-large tablets ==
Samsung announced the original Galaxy View, an 18.4-inch tablet, in October 2015. It was succeeded by the slightly smaller, 17.3-inch, Galaxy View 2 in April 2019.

Name	Release date
Samsung Galaxy View	2015-11-06
Samsung Galaxy View 2	2019-04-26

== Windows tablets ==
Name	Release date
Samsung Ativ Tab	2012
Samsung Ativ Tab 5 / Ativ Smart PC	2012/2013
Samsung Ativ Tab 7 / Ativ Smart PC Pro	2012/2013
Samsung Ativ Tab 3	2013
Samsung Galaxy TabPro S	2016-03-18
Samsung Galaxy Book (10.6-inch)	2017-05-21
Samsung Galaxy Book (12-inch)	2017-04-21
Samsung Galaxy Book 2	2018-11-02

== Co-branded tablets ==
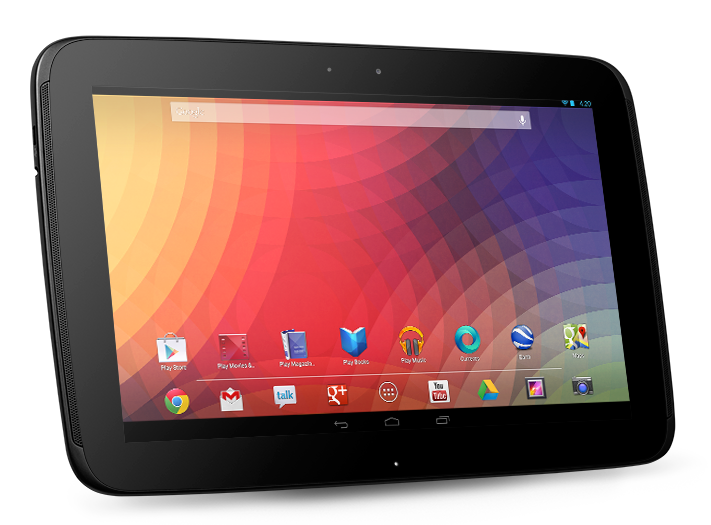
The Nexus 10, released in 2012, was the result of a collaboration between Samsung and Google.

- Nexus 10
- Samsung Galaxy Tab 4 Nook
- Samsung Galaxy Tab S2 Nook
- Samsung Galaxy Tab E Nook

== See also ==
- List of Android smartphones
- List of iPad models
