= Samsung Galaxy Tab 3 Lite 7.0 =

Android tablet by Samsung

Samsung Galaxy Tab 3 Lite 7.0 Samsung Galaxy Tab E lite 7.0

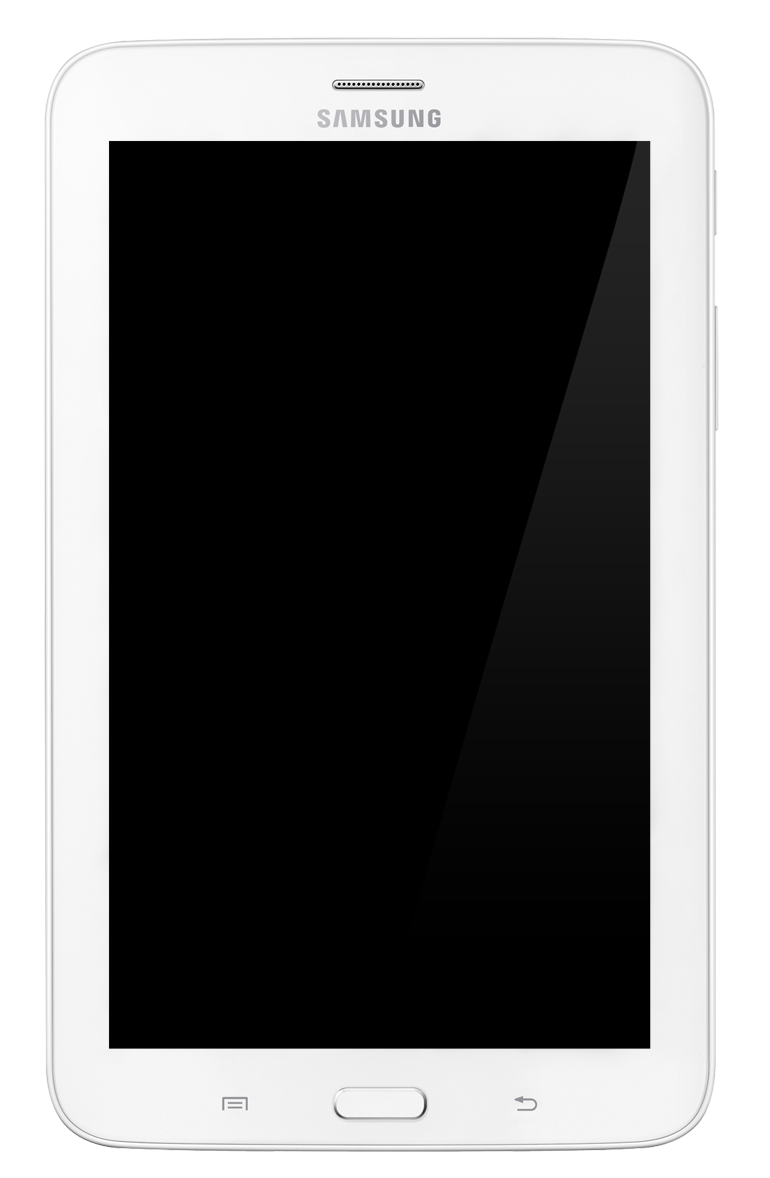
- Samsung Galaxy Tab 3 Lite 7.0 in White
- Also known as: SM-T111 (3G and Wi-Fi); SM-T110 (Wi-Fi)
- Developer: Samsung
- Product family: Galaxy Tab
- Type: Tablet,
- Released: 16 January 2014; 12 years ago
- Discontinued: Yes
- Units shipped: Yes
- Media: Yes
- Operating system: Android 4.2.2 "Jelly Bean"
- CPU: 1.2 GHz dual-core PXA986 (Cortex A9) SoC processor (Vivante GC1000 Core)
- Memory: 1GB RAM
- Storage: 8 GB flash memory, microSD slot (up to 64 GB)
- Display: 1024×600 px, 7.0 in (18 cm) diagonal, TFT capacitive touchscreen 169.55 ppi display
- Sound: Single rear speaker
- Input: Multi-touch screen, and, accelerometer,GPS
- Camera: 2 MP rear facing
- Connectivity: HSPA+ 21 Mbit/s 850/900/1900/2100 MHz (3G & WiFi model); EDGE/GPRS 850/900/1800/1900 MHz (3G & WiFi model); Wi-Fi 802.11b/g/n, Bluetooth 4.0
- Power: 3,600 mAh Li-Ion battery
- Dimensions: 193.4 mm (7.61 in) H 116.4 mm (4.58 in) W 9.7 mm (0.38 in) D
- Predecessor: Galaxy Tab 2 7.0
- Successor: Galaxy Tab 4 7.0, Galaxy Tab 3V
- Related: Galaxy Tab 3 7.0

The Samsung Galaxy Tab 3 Lite 7.0 is a 7-inch Android-based tablet computer produced and marketed by Samsung Electronics.

== History ==
The Galaxy Tab 3 Lite 7.0 was announced on 16 January 2014. This device series has 2 variants, T110 and T111. It was available at the price of $159.

== Colors ==
The Samsung Galaxy Tab 3 came in three colors on its 2013 release, Black, White, and Gold Brown. Four more colors were later introduced in 2014, Peach Pink, Blue Green, and Lemon Yellow.

== Features ==
The Galaxy Tab 3 Lite 7.0 was released with Android 4.2.2 Jelly Bean. Samsung has customized the interface with its TouchWiz UX software. As well as apps from Google, including Google Play, Gmail and YouTube, it has access to Samsung apps such as S Voice and S Planner.

The Galaxy Tab 3 Lite 7.0 is available in WiFi-only and 3G & Wi-Fi variants. Storage is only 8 GB on each model, with a microSD card slot for expansion. It has a 7-inch TFT LCD screen with a resolution of 1024x600 pixels, and only a rear-facing camera.
