= Samsung Galaxy Tab 4 10.1 =

Android tablet by Samsung

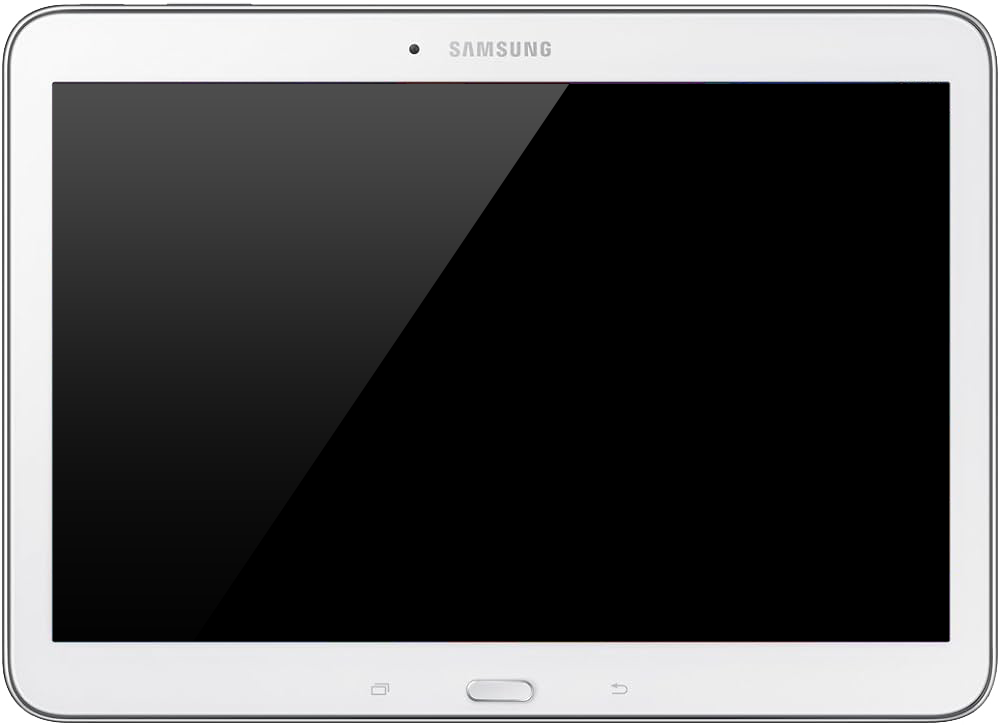
- Samsung Galaxy Tab 4 10.1
- Also known as: SM-T530 (WiFi); SM-T531 (3G & WiFi); SM-T535 (3G, 4G/LTE & WiFi)
- Developer: Samsung Electronics
- Product family: Galaxy Tab
- Type: Tablet, media player, PC
- Released: May 1, 2014
- Discontinued: 2016
- Operating system: Android 4.4.2 "KitKat"; Upgradable to Android 5.0.2 "Lollipop"
- CPU: 1.2 GHz Snapdragon 400 quad core ARM Cortex-A7 SoC
- Memory: 1.5 GB RAM
- Storage: 16/32 GB flash memory, microSDXC slot (up to 64 GB)
- Display: 1280×800 px, 10.1 in (26 cm) diagonal, WXGA TFT display
- Input: Multi-touch screen, digital compass, proximity and ambient light sensors, accelerometer
- Camera: 3.15 MP rear facing (without flash and touch focus), 1.3 MP front facing
- Connectivity: Cat3 100 / 50 Mbit/s hexa-band 800, 850, 900, 1800, 2100, 2600 MHz (4G, LTE model) HSPA+ 42, 5.76 Mbit/s 850, 900, 1900, 2100 MHz (4G, LTE model); HSPA+ 21, 5.76 Mbit/s quad 850, 900, 1900, 2100 MHz (3G, WiFi model); EDGE/GPRS quad 850, 900, 1800, 1900 MHz (3G, WiFi model) Wi-Fi 802.11a/b/g/n (2.4, 5 GHz), Bluetooth 4.0, HDMI (external cable)
- Power: 6,800 mAh Li-Ion battery
- Dimensions: 243.4 mm (9.58 in) H 176.4 mm (6.94 in) W 8.0 mm (0.31 in) D
- Weight: WiFi: 485 g (1.069 lb); 3G: 487 g (1.074 lb); 4G/LTE: 489 g (1.078 lb)
- Predecessor: Samsung Galaxy Tab 3 10.1
- Successor: Samsung Galaxy Tab E 9.6; Samsung Galaxy Tab A 9.7

The Samsung Galaxy Tab 4 10.1 is a 10.1-inch Android-based tablet computer produced and marketed by Samsung Electronics. It belongs to the fourth generation of the Samsung Galaxy Tab series, which also includes a 7-inch and an 8-inch model, which are the Galaxy Tab 4 7.0 and Galaxy Tab 4 8.0 respectively. It was announced on 1 April 2014, and released on 1 May 2014 along with the Samsung Galaxy Tab 4 8.0.

== Features ==
Galaxy Tab 4 10.1 was released with Android 4.4.2 KitKat. Samsung customized the interface with its TouchWiz UX software. Some devices only run up to Android 5.0.2 as opposed to the 5.1.1 version. It also has apps from Google, including Google Play, Gmail and YouTube, it has access to Samsung apps such as ChatON, S Suggest, S Voice, S Translator, S Planner, Smart Remote (Peel)(WiFi Version Only), Smart Stay, Multi-Window, Group Play, and All Share Play.

The device is available in WiFi-only, 3G &Wi-Fi, and 4G/LTE (carried by AT&T and Verizon) & WiFi variants. Storage ranges from 16 GB to 32 GB depending on the model, with a microSDXC card slot for expansion. It has a 10.1-inch WXGA TFT screen with a resolution of 1280x800 pixels. It also features a 1.3 MP front camera without flash and 3.0 MP AF rear-facing camera. It also has the ability to record HD videos. It has GPS and a GLONASS receiver.

Preceded by Samsung Galaxy Tab 3 10.1	Samsung Galaxy Tab 4 10.1; 2014	Succeeded by Samsung Galaxy Tab E 9.6; Samsung Galaxy Tab A 9.7
