= Samsung Galaxy Tab 4 8.0 =

Android tablet by Samsung

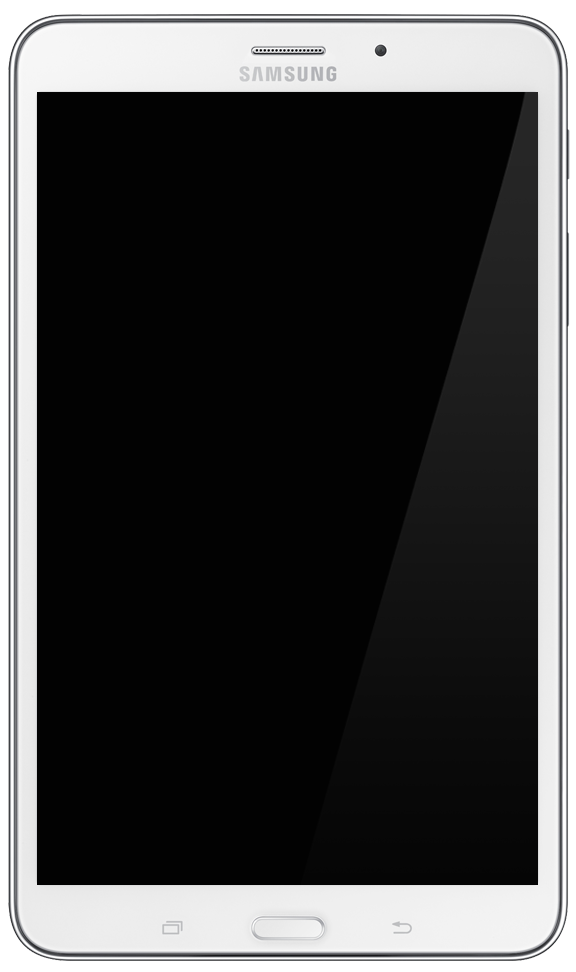
- Samsung Galaxy Tab 4 8.0 in White
- Also known as: SM-T330NU (WiFi); SM-T331NU (3G & WiFi); SM-T337V (3G, 4G/LTE & WiFi)
- Manufacturer: Samsung Electronics
- Product family: Galaxy Tab
- Type: Tablet, media player, PC
- Released: 1 May 2014
- Operating system: Android 4.4.2 "KitKat" Upgradeable to Android 5.1.1 Lollipop
- System on a chip: Qualcomm Snapdragon 400
- CPU: 1.2 GHz quad core Qualcomm Snapdragon 400 SoC processor
- Memory: 1.5 GB
- Storage: 16/32 GB flash memory, MicroSD slot (up to 128 GB)
- Display: 1280×800 px, 8.0 in (20 cm) diagonal, WXGA TFT display
- Graphics: Adreno 305
- Input: Multi-touch screen, Hall sensor, accelerometer
- Camera: 3.15 MP Fixed Focus rear-facing, 1.3 MP front-facing
- Connectivity: Cat3 100 / 50 Mbit/s hexa-band 800, 850, 900, 1800, 2100, 2600 MHz (4G, LTE model) HSPA+ 42, 5.76 Mbit/s 850, 900, 1900, 2100 MHz (4G, LTE model); HSPA+ 21, 5.76 Mbit/s quad 850, 900, 1900, 2100 MHz (3G, WiFi model); EDGE/GPRS quad 850, 900, 1800, 1900 MHz (3G, WiFi model) Wi-Fi 802.11a/b/g/n, Bluetooth 4.0, HDMI (external cable)
- Power: 4,450 mAh Li-ion battery
- Dimensions: 210.0 mm (8.27 in) H 124.0 mm (4.88 in) W 8.0 mm (0.31 in) D
- Weight: WiFi: 318 g (0.701 lb); 3G: 320 g (0.71 lb); 4G/LTE: 322 g (0.710 lb)
- Predecessor: Samsung Galaxy Tab 3 8.0
- Successor: Samsung Galaxy Tab A 8.0 (2015)
- Related: Samsung Galaxy Tab 4 7.0; Samsung Galaxy Tab 4 10.1

The Samsung Galaxy Tab 4 8.0 is an 8-inch Android-based tablet computer produced and marketed by Samsung Electronics. It belongs to the fourth generation of the Samsung Galaxy Tab series, which also includes a 7-inch and a 10.1-inch model, the Galaxy Tab 4 7.0 and Galaxy Tab 4 10.1. It was announced on 1 April 2014, and released on 1 May 2014 along with the Samsung Galaxy Tab 4 10.1. Unlike the 7-inch and 10.1 inch tablets, the Galaxy Tab 4 8.0 is only the second iteration of the 8-inch device platform.

== Features ==
The Galaxy Tab 4 8.0 was released with Android 4.4.2 KitKat. Samsung has customized the interface with its TouchWiz Essence UX software. As well as apps from Google, including Google Play, Gmail and YouTube, it has access to Samsung apps such as ChatON, Voice Recorder, Calendar, Smart Remote (Peel)(WiFi Version Only), Smart Stay, Multi-Window, Group Play, and All Share Play.

The Galaxy Tab 4 8.0 is available in Wi-Fi-only, 3G & Wi-Fi, and 4G/LTE & WiFi variants. Storage ranges from 16 GB to 32 GB depending on the model, with a microSDXC card slot for expansion. It has an 8-inch WXGA TFT screen with a resolution of 1280×800 pixels. It also features a 1.3 MP front camera without flash and 3.0 MP Fixed Focus rear-facing camera. It also has the ability to record HD videos.

== See also ==
- Samsung Galaxy Tab series
- Samsung Electronics
- Samsung Galaxy Tab 4 7.0
- Samsung Galaxy Tab 4 10.1
