= Samsung Galaxy Tab A 9.7 =

Android tablet by Samsung

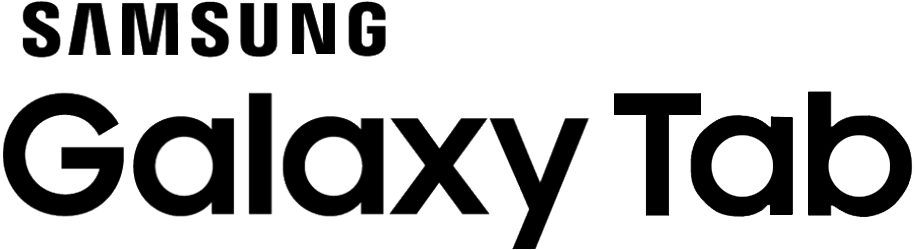
- Also known as: Regular Model: SM-T550 (WiFi); SM-T555 (3G, 4G/LTE & WiFi); S-Pen Model: SM-P550 (WiFi); SM-P555 (3G, 4G/LTE & WiFi)
- Manufacturer: Samsung Electronics
- Product family: Galaxy Tab; Galaxy A
- Type: Tablet computer
- Released: 1 May 2015; 10 years ago
- Operating system: Android 5.0.2 Lollipop; Android 6.0.1 Marshmallow; Android 7.1.1 Nougat
- System on a chip: Qualcomm Snapdragon 410 APQ8016
- CPU: 1.2GHz: Quad-Core Qualcomm Snapdragon 410
- Memory: Regular Model: 1.5 GB (Wi-Fi); 2 GB (LTE); S-Pen Model: 2 GB
- Storage: 16/32 GB flash memory, microSDXC slot (up to 128 GB)
- Display: 1024x768 px (132 ppi), 9.7 in (25 cm) diagonal, TFT LCD
- Graphics: Adreno 306 GPU
- Sound: Built-in stereo
- Input: Multi-touch screen, digital compass, proximity and ambient light sensors, accelerometer
- Camera: 5.0MP AF rear facing, 2 MP front facing
- Connectivity: Cat3 100 Mbps DL, 50 Mbps UP Hexa-Band 800/850/900/1800/2100/2600 (4G/LTE & WiFi model); HSDPA 42.2 Mbit/s, (4G/LTE & WiFi model); HSUPA 5.76 Mbit/s 850/900/1900/2100 (4G/LTE & WiFi model); EDGE/GPRS Quad 850/900/1800/1900 (4G/LTE & WiFi model); Wi-Fi 802.11a/b/g/n/ac (2.4 & 5GHz), Bluetooth 4.0, HDMI (external cable), GPS
- Power: 6,000 mAh Li-Ion battery
- Dimensions: 242.5 mm (9.55 in) H 166.8 mm (6.57 in) W 7.5 mm (0.30 in) D
- Weight: Regular Model: WiFi: 450 g (0.99 lb); 4G/LTE: 453 g (0.999 lb); S-Pen Model: WiFi: 490 g (1.08 lb); 4G/LTE: 493 g (1.087 lb)
- Predecessor: Samsung Galaxy Tab 4 10.1
- Successor: Samsung Galaxy Tab A 10.1
- Related: Samsung Galaxy Tab S2 9.7; Samsung Galaxy Tab S2 8.0; Samsung Galaxy Tab A 8.0

The Samsung Galaxy Tab A 9.7 is a 9.7-inch Android-based tablet computer produced and marketed by Samsung Electronics. It belongs to the mid-range "A" line, which also includes an 8.0-inch model, the Samsung Galaxy Tab A 8.0. It was announced in March 2015, and subsequently released on 1 May 2015.

== History ==
The Galaxy Tab A 9.7 was announced together with the smaller Galaxy Tab A 8.0 in March 2015.

== Features ==
The Galaxy Tab A 9.7 is released with Android 5.0 Lollipop. Samsung has customized the interface with its TouchWiz software. As well as the standard suite of Google apps, it has Samsung apps such as S Planner, WatchON, Smart Stay, Multi-Window, Group Play, Multi-user mode, SideSync 4.0. The S-Pen models are also equipped with the S-Pen suite found in the Samsung Galaxy Note series.

The Galaxy Tab A 9.7 equipped models are available in WiFi-only and 4G/LTE & WiFi variants. Storage ranges from 16 GB to 32 GB depending on the model, with a microSDXC card slot for expansion up to 512 GB. It has a 9.7-inch TFT LCD screen with a resolution of 1024x768 pixels and a pixel density of 132 ppi. It also features a 2 MP front camera without flash and a rear-facing 5.0 MP AF camera without flash.

== Software ==
The Galaxy Tab A was released with Android 5.0.2 Lollipop.

Unlike the smaller 8.0 inch model, the rollout of the Android Marshmallow Update started in May 2016. The Android 7.1.1 Nougat started in September 2017.

== See also ==
- Comparison of tablet computers
