= Samsung Galaxy Tab 3 7.0 =

Android tablet by Samsung

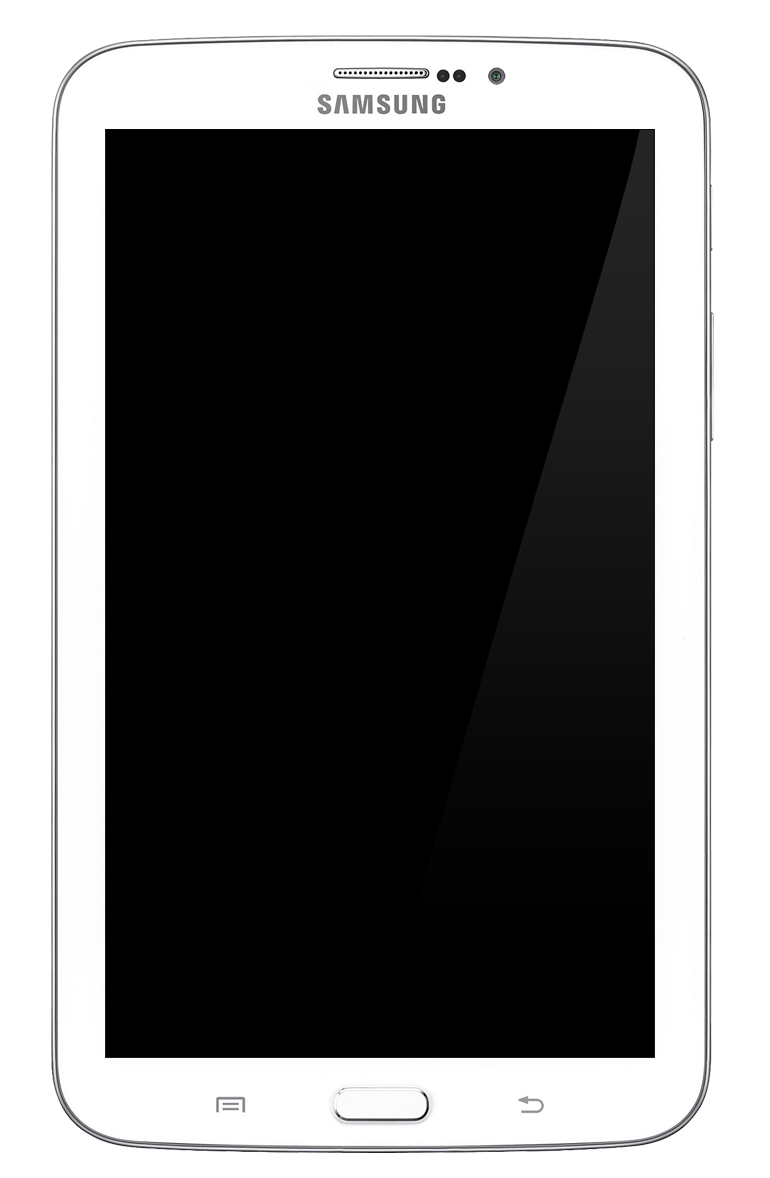
- Samsung Galaxy Tab 3 7.0 in White
- Also known as: GT-P3220/SM-T217A (3G, 4G/LTE and Wifi); GT-P3200/SM-T211 (3G and Wifi); GT-P3210/SM-T210 (Wifi)
- Manufacturer: Samsung Electronics
- Product family: Galaxy Tab
- Type: Tablet, media player, PC
- Released: 7 July 2013 (US)
- Operating system: Original: Android 4.1.2 "Jelly Bean"; Android 4.2.2 "Jelly Bean"(SM-T210R model); Current: Android 4.4.2 "KitKat"; Unofficial: Android 7.1.2 (LineageOS 14.1) via custom ROMs
- CPU: 1.2 GHz dual-core PXA986 (Cortex A9) SoC processor (Wifi & 3G+Wifi version); 1.7 GHz dual-core Snapdragon 400 Krait 300 (LTE version)
- Memory: 1 GB (Wifi & 3G+Wifi version), 1.5GB (LTE version)
- Storage: 8/16/32 GB flash memory, microSD slot (up to 64 GB)
- Display: 1024×600 px, 7.0 in (18 cm) diagonal, TFT capacitive touchscreen display
- Input: Multi-touch screen, digital compass, proximity, and ambient light sensors, accelerometer, GPS
- Camera: 3.15 MP rear facing, 1.3 MP front facing
- Connectivity: LTE 100 Mbps DL, 50 Mbps UL Dual Band 1800/2600 (LTE version); HSPA+ 21/5.76 Mbit/s 900/2100, EDGE/GPRS 900/1800 MHz (LTE version); HSPA+ 21 Mbit/s 850/900/1900/2100 MHz (3G & WiFi model); EDGE/GPRS 850/900/1800/1900 MHz (3G & WiFi model); Wi-Fi 802.11a/b/g/n, Bluetooth 3.0
- Power: 4,000 mAh Li-Ion battery
- Dimensions: 188.0 mm (7.40 in) H 111.1 mm (4.37 in) W 9.9 mm (0.39 in) D
- Weight: 306 g (0.675 lb)
- Predecessor: Samsung Galaxy Tab 2 7.0
- Successor: Samsung Galaxy Tab 4 7.0; Samsung Galaxy Tab A 8.0
- Website: Microsite

The Samsung Galaxy Tab 3 7.0 is a 7-inch Android-based tablet computer produced and marketed by Samsung Electronics. It belongs to the third generation of the Samsung Galaxy Tab series, which also includes the 8-inch Galaxy Tab 3 8.0 and the 10.1-inch Galaxy Tab 3 10.1. It was announced on 29 April 2013 and launched in the US on 7 July 2013.

== History ==
The Galaxy Tab 3 7.0 was announced on June 24, 2013. It was shown along with the Galaxy Tab 3 10.1 at the 2013 Mobile World Conference. Samsung confirmed that the Galaxy Tab 3 7.0 would be released on 7 July, with a price of $199 for the 8GB model.

== Features ==
Upgrade to Android 4.4.2 KitKat in September 2014 does not support Miracast (Wi-Fi display). The Galaxy Tab 3 7.0 was released with Android 4.1.2 Jelly Bean. But the Wi-Fi model has also received the Android 4.4.2 Update. Samsung has customized the interface with its TouchWiz UX software. As well as apps from Google, including Google Play, Gmail and YouTube, it has access to Samsung apps such as ChatON, Smart Remote (Peel), S Voice, Group Play , Multi-Window and All Share Play.

The Galaxy Tab 3 7.0 is available in WiFi-only, WiFi with an IR Blaster depending on region, 3G & Wi-Fi, and 4G/LTE (selected countries) variants. Internal storage ranges from 8 GB to 32 GB, depending on the model, with a microSD card slot for expansion (up to 64GB). It has a 7-inch TFT LCD screen with a resolution of 1024x600 pixels, and both front- and rear-facing cameras.

== Reception ==
Reception for the Galaxy Tab 3 7.0 has been generally mixed. PC World Australia reviewer Ross Catanzariti commented, "The Galaxy Tab 3 7.0 is an update to the Galaxy Tab 2 7.0 but there's not much that's new." Both Catanzariti and blog.gsmarena's Vince Lockford praised the slimmer size and lighter weight of the device, as well as the unified Samsung design language also used in the S4 and Note series. Like its predecessor, some criticism was made of the screen quality, with Lockford describing it as "dull and uninspiring", and CNET Australia's Nic Healey criticizing it as a "barebone or no-frills" compared to the 2013 Google Nexus 7, despite otherwise finding it worth a look.

== Special editions ==
As a special edition of this tablet, Samsung also released a Hello Kitty edition in November 2013.

Another special edition is the Samsung Galaxy Tab 3 Kids Edition. This is a children's tablet that has all the normal features of the tablet, but has an additional user interface for children in addition to protective casing. It was launched on 10 November 2013.
