= Samsung Galaxy Tab 3 10.1 =

Android tablet by Samsung

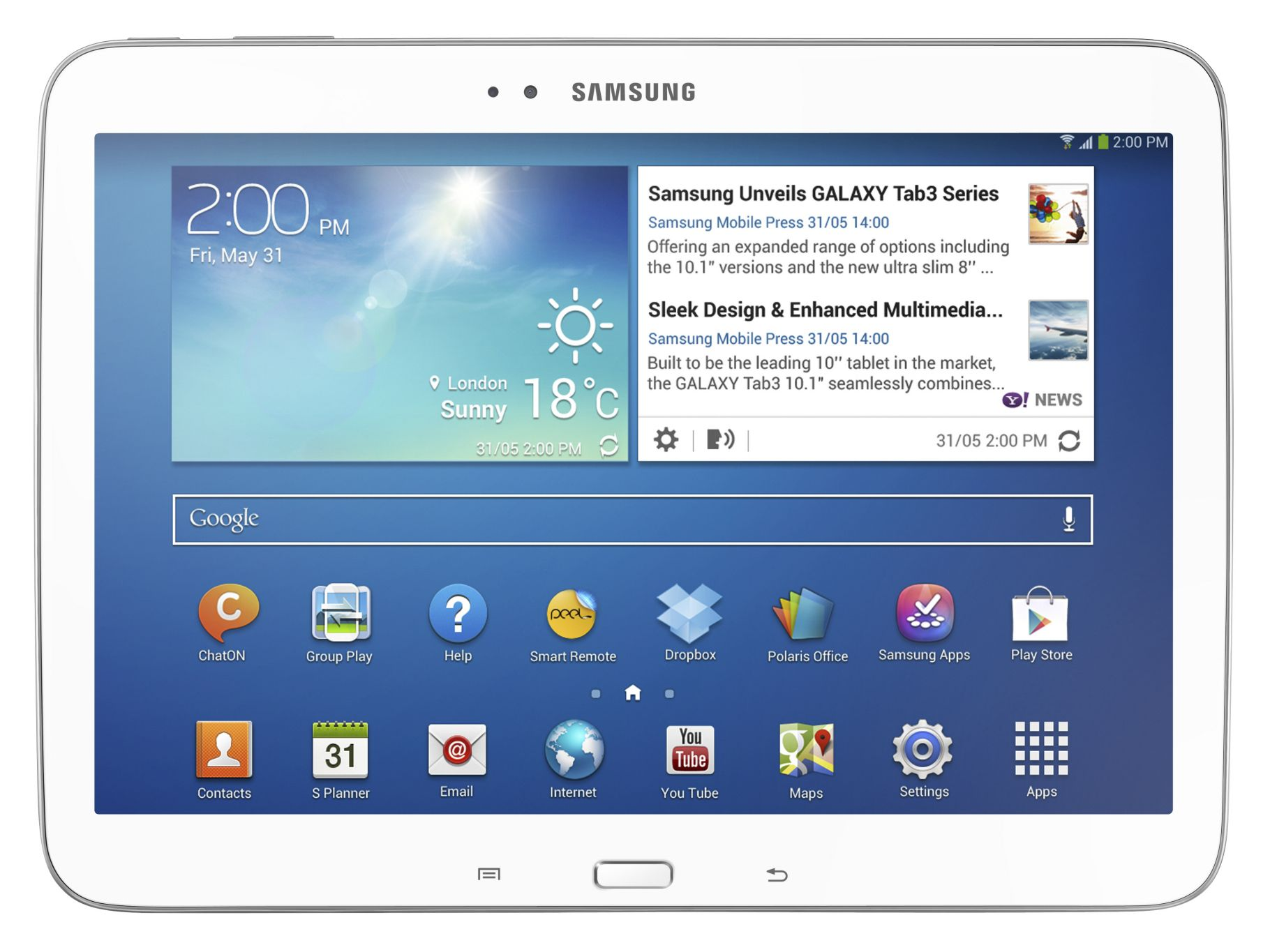
- Samsung Galaxy Tab 3 10.1
- Codename: Santos
- Also known as: GT-P5200 (codename: "santos103g", 3G & Wifi); GT-P5210 (codename: "santos10wifi", Wifi); GT-P5220 (codename: "santos10lte", LTE, 3G & Wifi)
- Developer: Samsung
- Product family: Galaxy Tab
- Type: Tablet, media player, PC
- Released: June 2013 (Worldwide); July 2013 (United States)
- Operating system: Android 4.2.2 "Jelly Bean"; upgradable to: Android 4.4.2 "KitKat", Android 7.1 (unofficial)
- CPU: 1.6 GHz Intel Atom Z2560 dual-core x86 HTSoC
- Memory: 1 GB RAM
- Storage: 16/32 GB flash memory, microSDXC slot (up to 64 GB)
- Display: 1280×800 px, 10.1 in (26 cm) diagonal, WXGA TFT display 149.45 PPI
- Graphics: PowerVR SGX544MP2
- Input: Multi-touch screen, digital compass, proximity and ambient light sensors, accelerometer
- Camera: 3.15 MP rear facing (without flash and touch focus), 1.3 MP front facing
- Connectivity: LTE 100 Mbit/s DL, 50 Mbit/s UL Hexa Band 800/850/900/1800/2100/2600 (4G & LTE model); HSPA+ 42/5.76 Mbit/s 850/900/1900/2100 (4G & LTE model); HSPA+ 21 Mbit/s 850/900/1900/2100 MHz (3G & WiFi model); Wi-Fi 802.11a/b/g/n (2.4 & 5GHz), Bluetooth 4.0, HDMI (external cable)
- Power: 6800 mAh Li-ion battery
- Dimensions: 243.1 mm (9.57 in) H 176.1 mm (6.93 in) W 7.95 mm (0.313 in) D
- Weight: 510 g (1.12 lb)
- Predecessor: Samsung Galaxy Tab 2 10.1
- Successor: Samsung Galaxy Tab 4 10.1
- Website: Website

The Samsung Galaxy Tab 3 10.1 is a 10.1-inch Android-based tablet computer produced and marketed by Samsung Electronics. It belongs to the third generation of the Samsung Galaxy Tab series, which also includes a 7-inch and an 8-inch model, the Galaxy Tab 3 7.0 and Galaxy Tab 3 8.0. It was announced on 3 June 2013 and launched in the US on 7 July 2013.

== History ==
The Galaxy Tab 3 10.1 was announced on 24 June 2013. It was shown along with the Galaxy Tab 3 7.0 and Galaxy Tab 3 8.0 at the 2013 Mobile World Conference. Samsung confirmed that the Galaxy Tab 3 10.1 would be released in the US on 7 July, with a price of $399.99 for the 16GB model.

== Features ==
The Galaxy Tab 3 10.1 was released with Android 4.2.2 Jelly Bean. It was expected that, as of the Summer 2013 release, an upgrade to Android 4.3 Jelly Bean would be made available; however, the upgrade was skipped, and an upgrade to Android 4.4.2 KitKat was released later in 2014. Samsung has customized the interface with its TouchWiz UX software. In 2022, it still ran perfectly on LineageOS 14.1 (Android 7.1.2). Samsung has customized the interface with its TouchWiz Nature UX software. As well as apps from Google, including Google Play, Gmail and YouTube, it has access to Samsung apps such as ChatON, S Suggest, S Voice, Smart Remote (Peel) and All Share Play.

The Galaxy Tab 3 10.1 is available in WiFi-only, 3G & Wi-Fi, and 4G/LTE & WiFi variants. Storage ranges from 16 GB to 32 GB, depending on the model, with a microSDXC card slot for expansion. It has a 10.1-inch WXGA TFT screen with a resolution of 1280x800 pixels. It also features a 1.3 MP front camera without flash and a 3.15 MP rear-facing camera. It also has the ability to record HD videos.

The Micro USB connector on the Galaxy Tab 3 10.1 supports MHL 1.

== Special Edition ==
In January 2014, Samsung announced that it would release a special edition of the Galaxy Tab, called Galaxy Tab for Education, starting in April. This special edition features support and features for the K-12 education sector. Among additional specs, Samsung implemented NFC.

== Gallery ==
Samsung Galaxy Tab 3

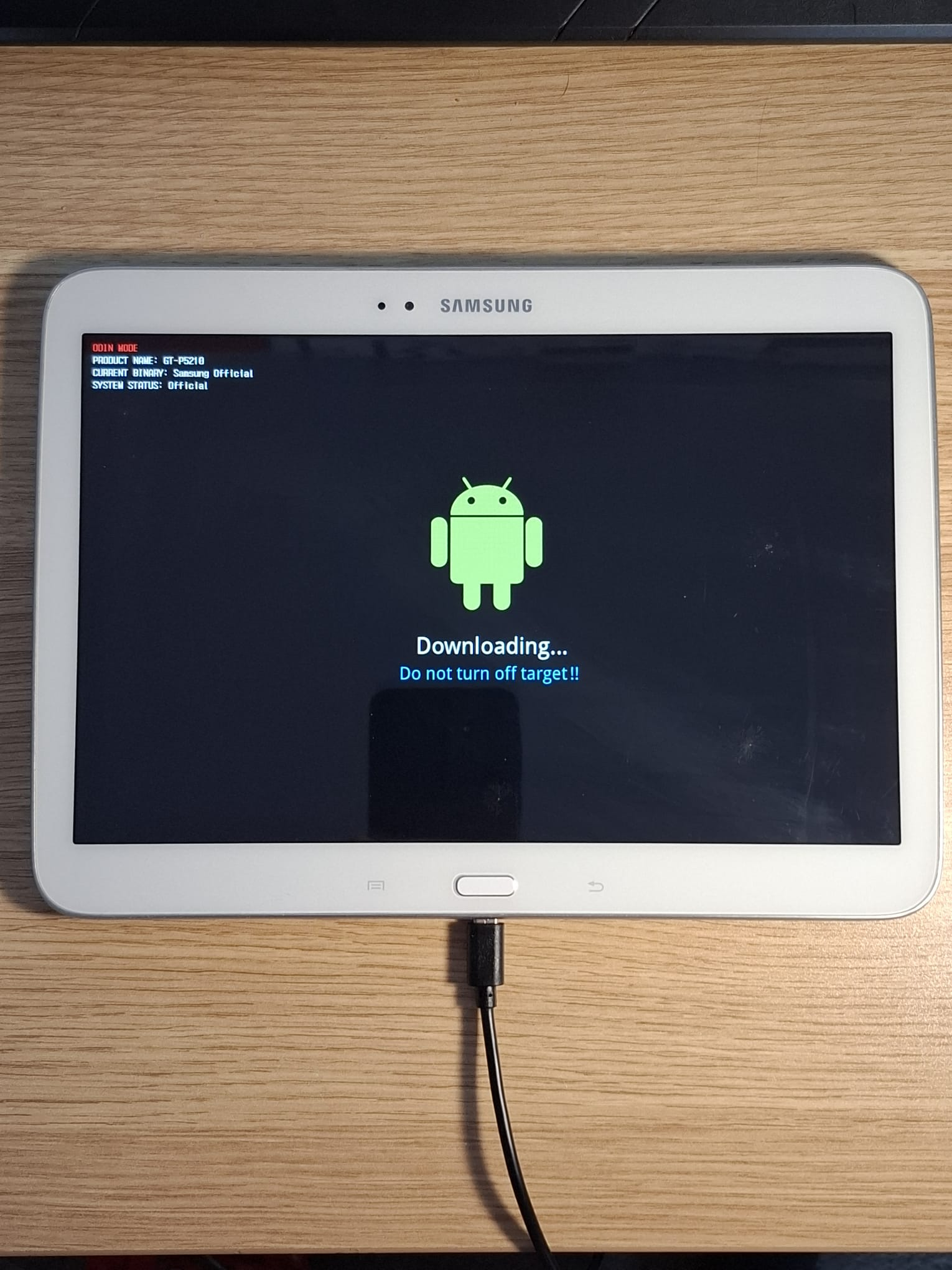
Front side

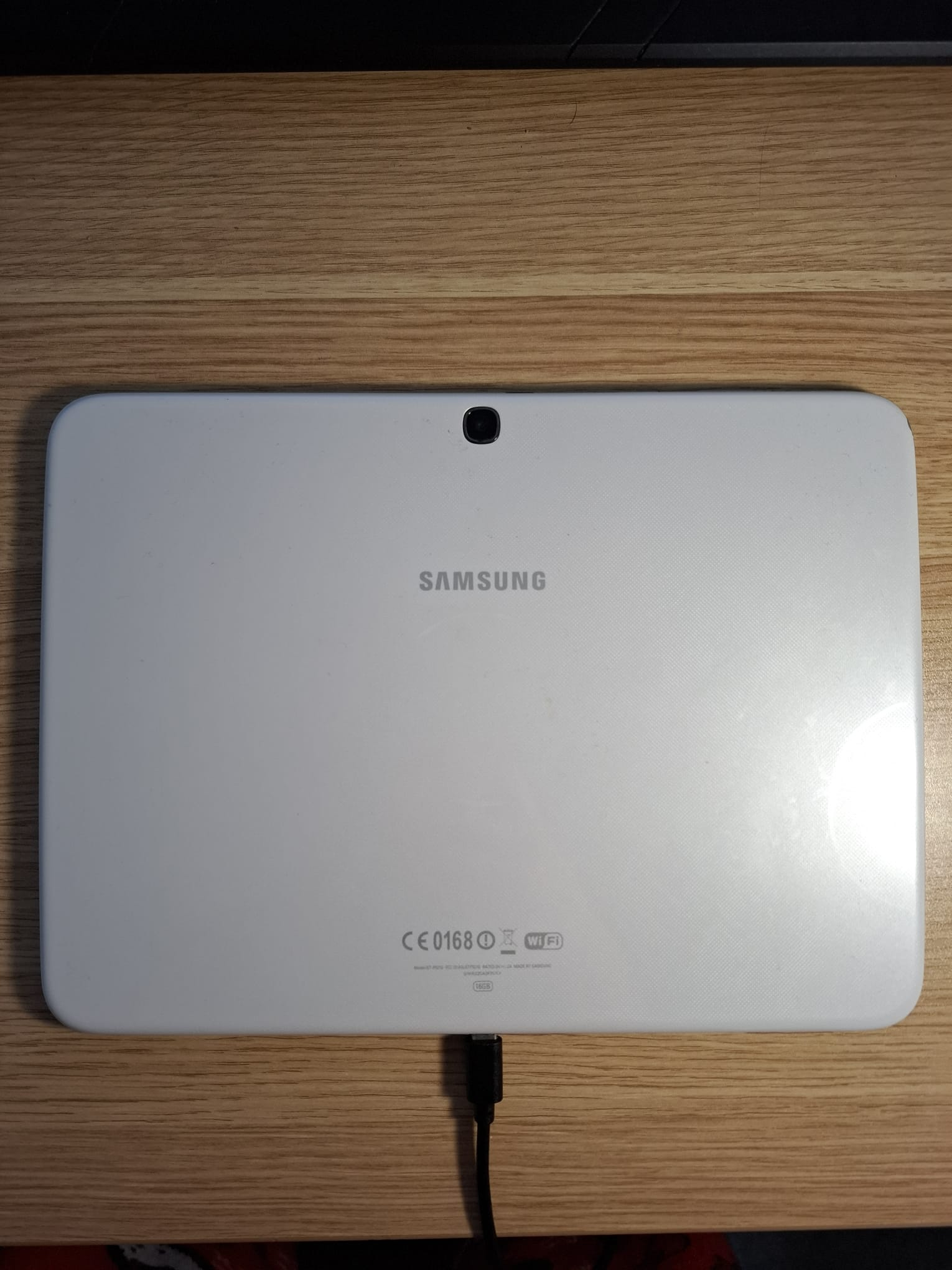
Rear side

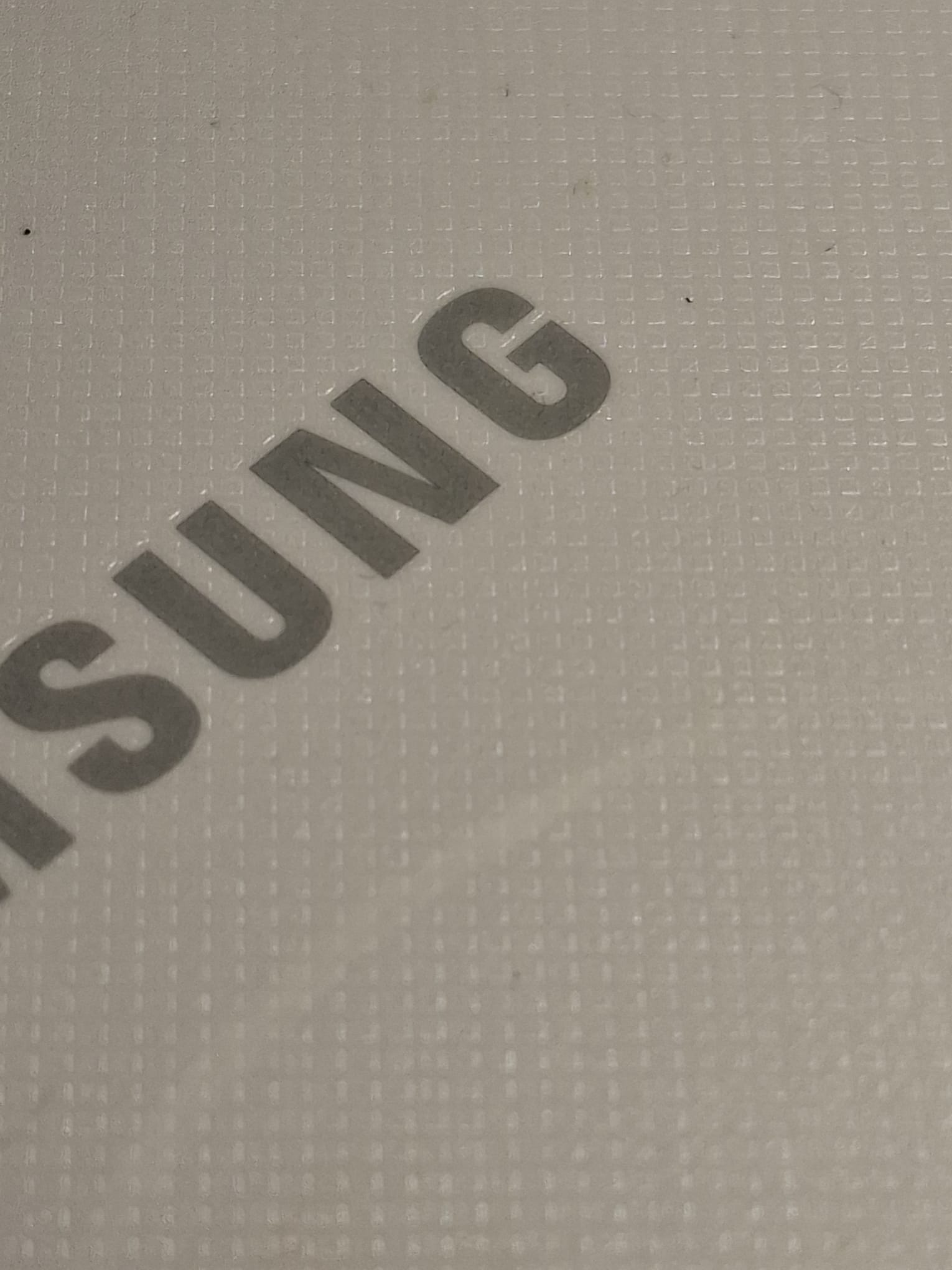
Small grooves on rear surface

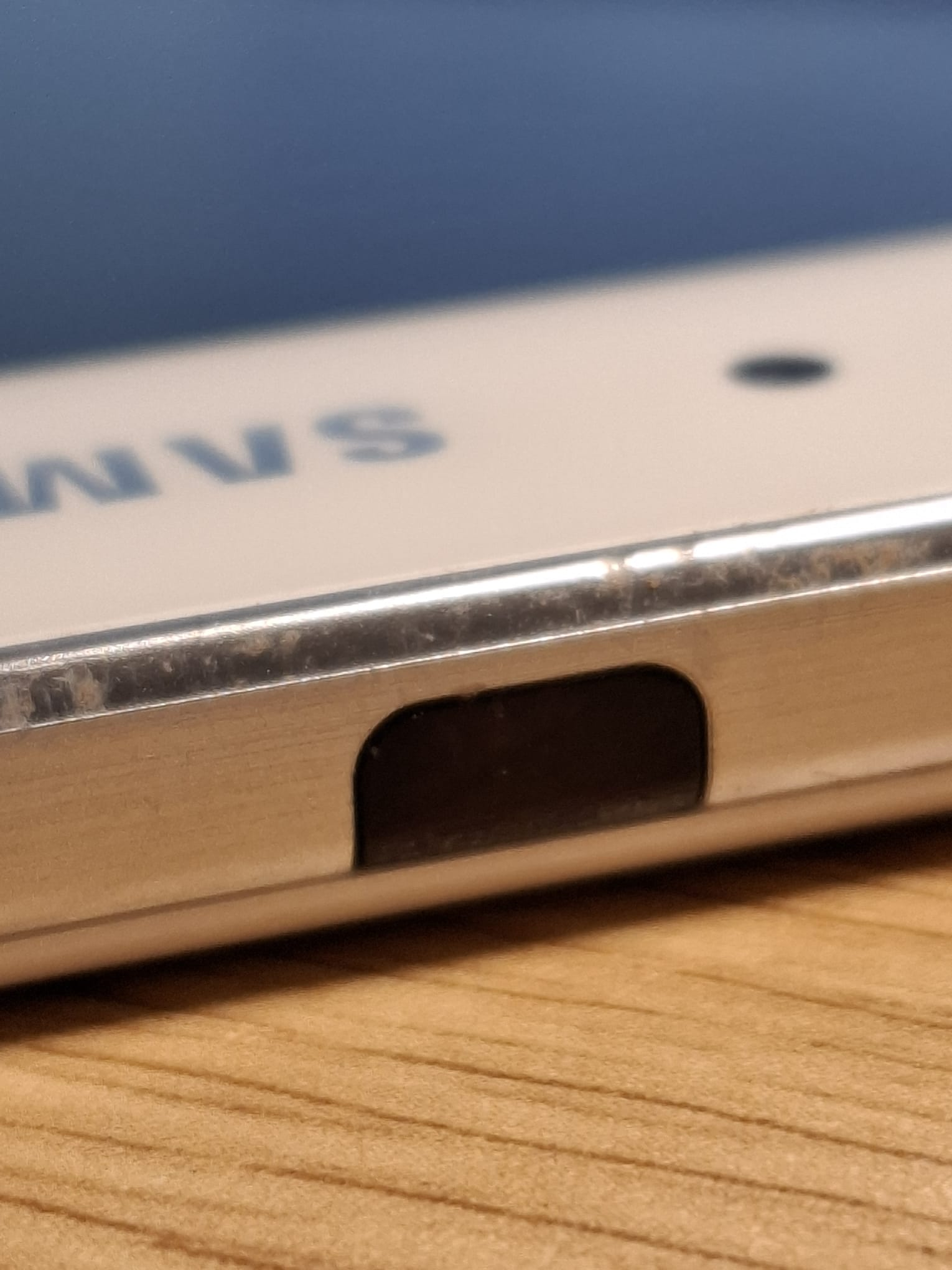
Infrared

Preceded by Samsung Galaxy Tab 2 10.1	Samsung Galaxy Tab 3 10.1; 2013	Succeeded by Samsung Galaxy Tab 4 10.1
