= Samsung Galaxy Tab A 10.1 =

Android tablet by Samsung

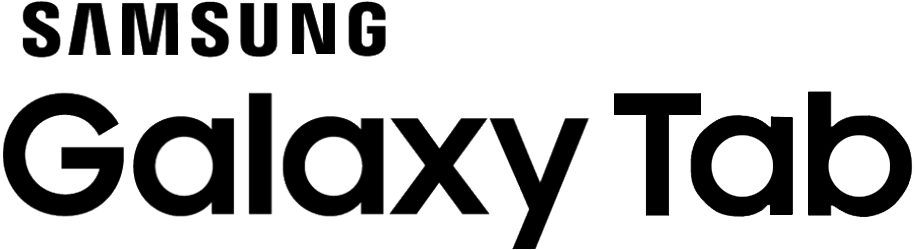

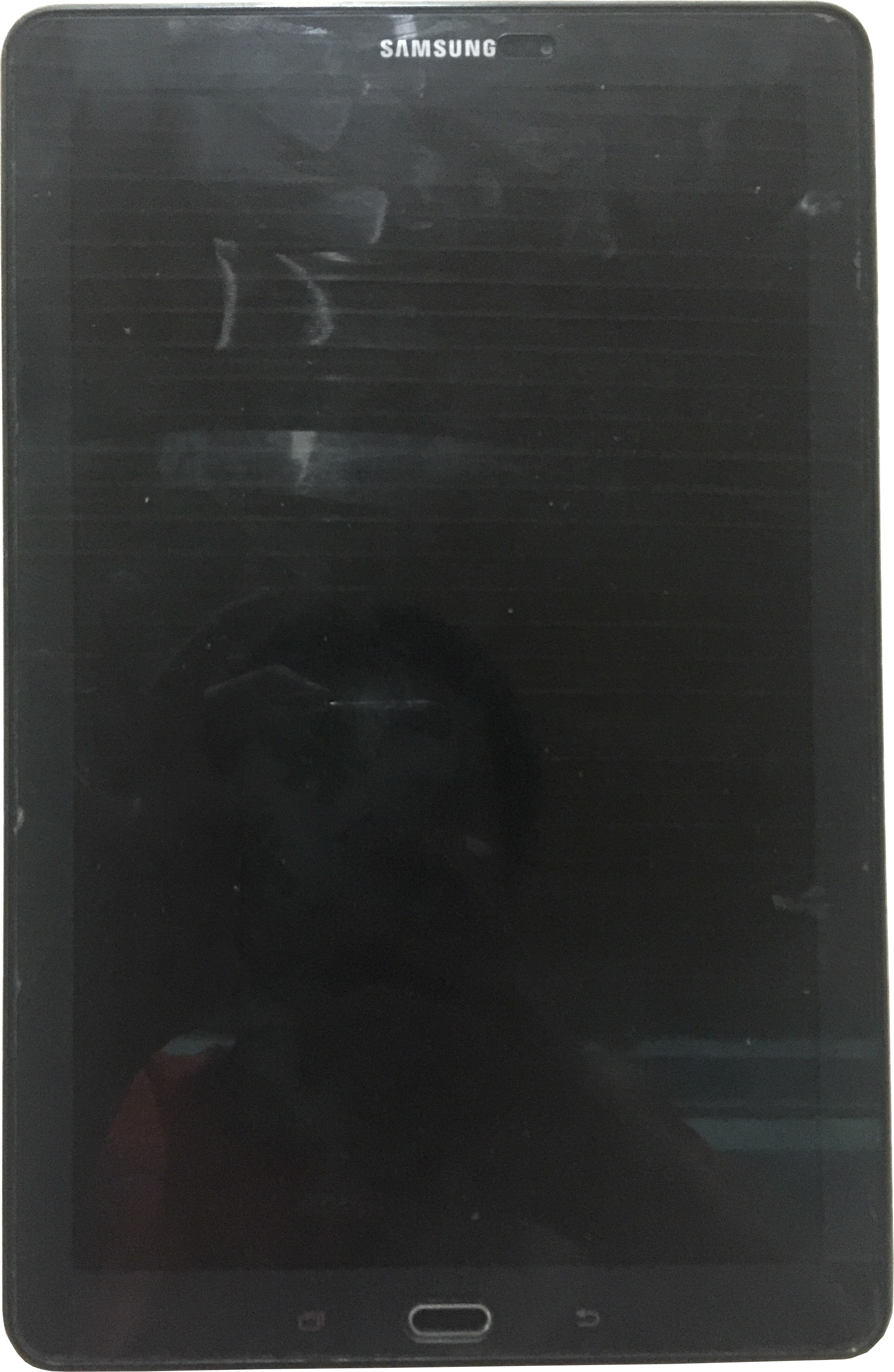
- Codename: gtaxlwifi (SM-T580); gtaxllte (SM-T585); gtanotexlwifi (SM-P580); gtanotexllte (SM-P585)
- Also known as: Regular model: SM-T580 (WiFi); SM-T510 (WiFi); SM-T585 (3G, 4G/LTE & WiFi); SM-T587 (3G, 4G/LTE & WiFi); SM-T515 (3G, 4G/LTE & WiFi); S-Pen Model: SM-P580 (WiFi); SM-P585 (3G, 4G/LTE & WiFi)
- Manufacturer: Samsung Electronics
- Product family: Galaxy; Galaxy Tab; Galaxy A
- Type: Tablet computer
- Released: 10 May 2016; 9 years ago
- Operating system: 2016 Android 6.0.1 Marshmallow; 2018 Upgradable to Android 8.1 Oreo; 2019 Android 9 Pie. Upgradable to Android 11
- System on a chip: 2016 Exynos 7870; 2019 Exynos 7904
- CPU: 2016 1.6 GHz Octa-Core ARM Cortex-A53; 2019 1.8 GHz Octa-Core ARM Cortex-A73
- Memory: Regular Model: 2 GB; S-Pen Model: 3 GB
- Storage: 16/32 GB flash memory, microSDXC slot (up to 256 GB)
- Display: 2016 & 2019 1920x1200 px (224 ppi), 10.1 in (26 cm) diagonal, PLS TFT LCD (2.3 megapixels)
- Graphics: 2016 Mali-T 830 MP2; 2019 Mali (GPU) 71 MP2
- Sound: Built-in stereo
- Input: Multi-touch screen
- Camera: 2016 8.0MP AF rear facing, 2 MP front facing 2019 8.0MP AF rear facing, 5 MP front facing
- Connectivity: Cat4 150 Mbit/s DL, 50 Mbit/s UP 800/850/900/1800/2100/2300/2600, HSDPA 42.2 Mbit/s, HSUPA 5.76 Mbit/s 850/900/1900/2100, EDGE/GPRS Quad 850/900/1800/1900 (4G/LTE & WiFi model); Wi-Fi 802.11a/b/g/n/ac (2.4 & 5 GHz), Bluetooth 4.2, GPS/GLONASS
- Power: 2016 7,300 mAh Li-Ion battery 2019 6,150 mAh Li-Ion battery
- Dimensions: Regular Model: 254.2 mm (10.01 in) H 155.3 mm (6.11 in) W 8.2 mm (0.32 in) D S-Pen Model: 245.3 mm (9.66 in) H 164.2 mm (6.46 in) W 8.2 mm (0.32 in) D
- Weight: Regular Model: 525 g (1.157 lb); S-Pen Model: 558 g (1.230 lb)
- Predecessor: Samsung Galaxy Tab A 9.7; Samsung Galaxy Tab E 9.6; Samsung Galaxy Tab S2 9.7
- Successor: Samsung Galaxy Tab A7
- Related: Samsung Galaxy Tab A 9.7

The Samsung Galaxy Tab A 10.1 is a 10.1-inch Android-based tablet computer produced and marketed by Samsung Electronics. It belongs to the mid-range "A" series, which also includes the 7-inch model and, in the past, the 8- and 9.7-inch models. It was released in May 2016; the S-Pen (stylus) version was released in September 2016. A refreshed version of the tablet would later be released in 2019, with some aspects, such as the battery, being reduced, while other components were upgraded.

== Features ==
The Galaxy Tab A 10.1 comes with Android 6.0 Marshmallow, customized with TouchWiz software and Samsung apps such as S Planner, WatchON, Smart Stay, Multi-Window, Group Play, and the S-Pen suite for the S-Pen version.

As of 2018, the tablet runs Samsung Experience 9.5, based on Android 8.1.0 Oreo.

The Galaxy Tab A 10.1 is available in WiFi-only and 4G/LTE & Wi-Fi variants. It has a 10.1-inch PLS LCD screen with a resolution of 1920x1200 pixels. It also has a 2 MP front camera without flash and a rear-facing 8.0 MP F1.9 AF camera with flash. It has various camera modes like Sports, Beauty, HDR, Auto, Night, Continuous Shot, Pro mode, and Panorama.

The tablet is extremely thin but is also durable. It has only one physical button at the front, which is the home button, and has three more buttons at the right-hand side of the tablet, one power button, one volume up button, and one volume down button. There are also two soft buttons present at the front of the screen. One recents and one back button.

The NotebookCheck site praised the tablet's connectivity and GPS, battery life, and responsiveness in general applications, but criticized the camera's performance, slow responsiveness of the screen during gaming, and subpar speaker performance -especially noting the absence of bass and sound originating from only one side of the device in landscape mode- and slow drive sequential write speeds.

== Galaxy Tab A 10.1 (2019) ==
A new version of the Galaxy Tab A 10.1 was announced in February 2019 (models SM-T510 & SM-T515), with Android 9 Pie (upgradable to Android 11), the Exynos 7904 chipset, and an IPS display with unchanged resolution. The rear flash is removed, S-Pen support is dropped and the battery is smaller, while the front camera is upgraded to 5 MP and the speakers are now stereo.

== See also ==
- Comparison of tablet computers
