= Samsung Galaxy Tab 2 7.0 =

Android tablet by Samsung

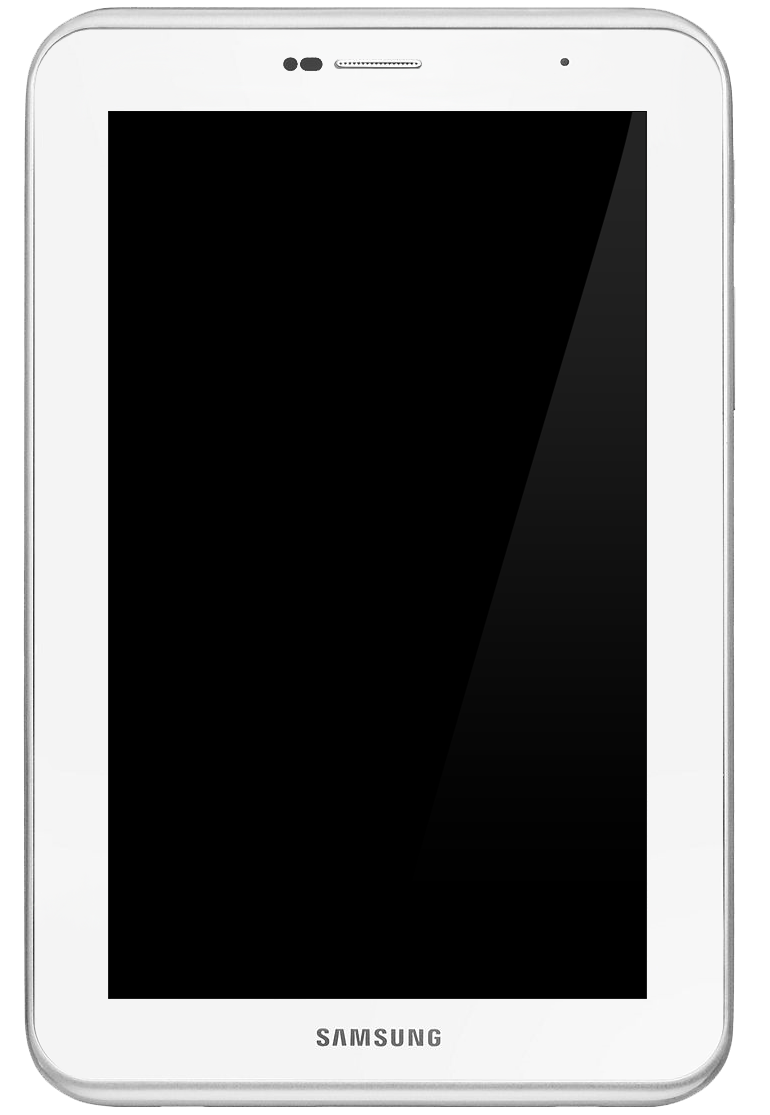
- Samsung Galaxy Tab 2 7.0 in White
- Also known as: GT-P3100 (3G & Wifi); GT-P3110 (Wifi)/GT-P3113 (with Infrared port); SCH-i705 (Verizon model)
- Developer: Samsung
- Product family: Galaxy Tab
- Type: phablet, media player, PC
- Released: 22 April 2012 (US)
- Operating system: Original: Android 4.0.3 "Ice Cream Sandwich"; Current: Android 4.2.2 "Jelly Bean"; Unofficial: Android 6.0 "Marshmallow"; CyanogenMod 13 via custom ROMs
- System on a chip: Qualcomm Snapdragon S4 Plus (Verizon model)
- CPU: 1.0 GHz dual-core TI OMAP4430 (Cortex A9) SoC processor Qualcomm Krait clocked @ 1.2 GHz (Verizon model)
- Memory: 1 GB
- Storage: 8/16/32 GB flash memory, microSD slot (up to 32 GB)
- Display: 1024×600 px, 7.0 in (18 cm) diagonal, PLS TFT LCD
- Graphics: PowerVR SGX540 Adreno 225 (Verizon model)
- Input: Multi-touch screen, digital compass, proximity and ambient light sensors, accelerometer, GPS
- Camera: 3.0 MP rear facing, VGA (0.3 MP) front facing
- Connectivity: HSPA+ 21 Mbit/s 850/900/1900/2100 MHz (3G & WiFi model); EDGE/GPRS 850/900/1800/1900 MHz (3G & WiFi model); Wi-Fi 802.11b/g/n, Bluetooth 3.0; LTE (Verizon model)
- Power: 4000 mAh Li-Ion battery
- Dimensions: 122.4 mm (4.82 in) H 193.7 mm (7.63 in) W 10.5 mm (0.41 in) D
- Weight: 344 g (0.758 lb)
- Predecessor: Samsung Galaxy Tab 7.0 Plus
- Successor: Samsung Galaxy Tab 3 7.0
- Website: Microsite

The Samsung Galaxy Tab 2 7.0 is a 7-inch Android tablet computer produced and marketed by Samsung Electronics. Samsung Galaxy Tab 2 is an Ice Cream Sandwich sequel. It belongs to the second generation of the Samsung Galaxy Tab series, which also includes a 10.1-inch model, the Galaxy Tab 2 10.1. It was announced on 13 February 2012, and launched in the US on 22 April 2012. It is the successor to the Samsung Galaxy Tab 7.0 Plus.

== History ==
The Galaxy Tab 2 7.0 was announced on 13 February 2012. It was shown along with the Galaxy Tab 2 10.1 at the 2012 Mobile World Conference. Although the two devices were originally scheduled to launch in March, they did not do so, with Samsung explaining that the delay was due to unspecified problems with Ice Cream Sandwich and that they would instead be released at the end of April. Samsung later confirmed that the Galaxy Tab 2 7.0 would be released on 22 April, with a price of $250 for the 8GB model.

== Features ==
The Galaxy Tab 2 7.0 was originally released with Android 4.0.3 Ice Cream Sandwich. An upgrade to Android 4.2.2 Jelly Bean was later made available. Samsung has customized the interface with its TouchWiz UX software. As well as apps from Google, including Google Play, Gmail and YouTube, it has access to Samsung apps such as ChatON, S Suggest and All Share Play.

The Galaxy Tab 2 7.0 is available in WiFi-only, WiFi with an IR Blaster (only available in the US and Canada), and 3G & WiFi variants. Storage ranges from 8 GB to 32 GB depending on the model, with a microSD card slot for expansion. It has a 7-inch PLS LCD screen with a resolution of 1024x600 pixels, and both front- and rear-facing cameras. It is listed with 1GB of RAM but only 0.77GB are usable.

An additional feature is the Samsung "Find my mobile" functionality which allows one to track the location of their mobile device if it is lost or remotely wipe it.

The device utilizes the Samsung proprietary connector for connecting a USB charging/data cable. In addition an adapter can be used that adds a USB OTG port enabling the tablet to be a USB host device. USB Mass Storage devices can be attached without any need for drivers. Additionally support for USB HID keyboard and mice are possible with this port. Limitations of device options are based on the Linux kernel version installed.

== Reception ==
Reception for the Galaxy Tab 2 7.0 has been generally positive. The Verge reviewer David Pierce commented, "The Tab 2 is more powerful than either the Kindle Fire or the Nook Tablet, and because it runs a fuller version of Android it's a more capable device if you're interested in more than just reading." Both Pierce and TechRadar's James Stables praised the size and weight of the device, as well as the low price compared to other full-size tablets. Some criticism was made of the screen quality, with Stables describing it as "dull and unresponsive", and Expert Reviews' David Ludlow criticizing the low resolution compared to the 2012 Google Nexus 7, despite otherwise finding it impressive.

== Variants ==
Verizon released the Galaxy Tab 2 (7.0) under the name "Galaxy Tab 2 (7.0) 4G LTE". This device was sold in Verizon Wireless stores.
