= Samsung Galaxy Tab 2 10.1 =

Android tablet by Samsung

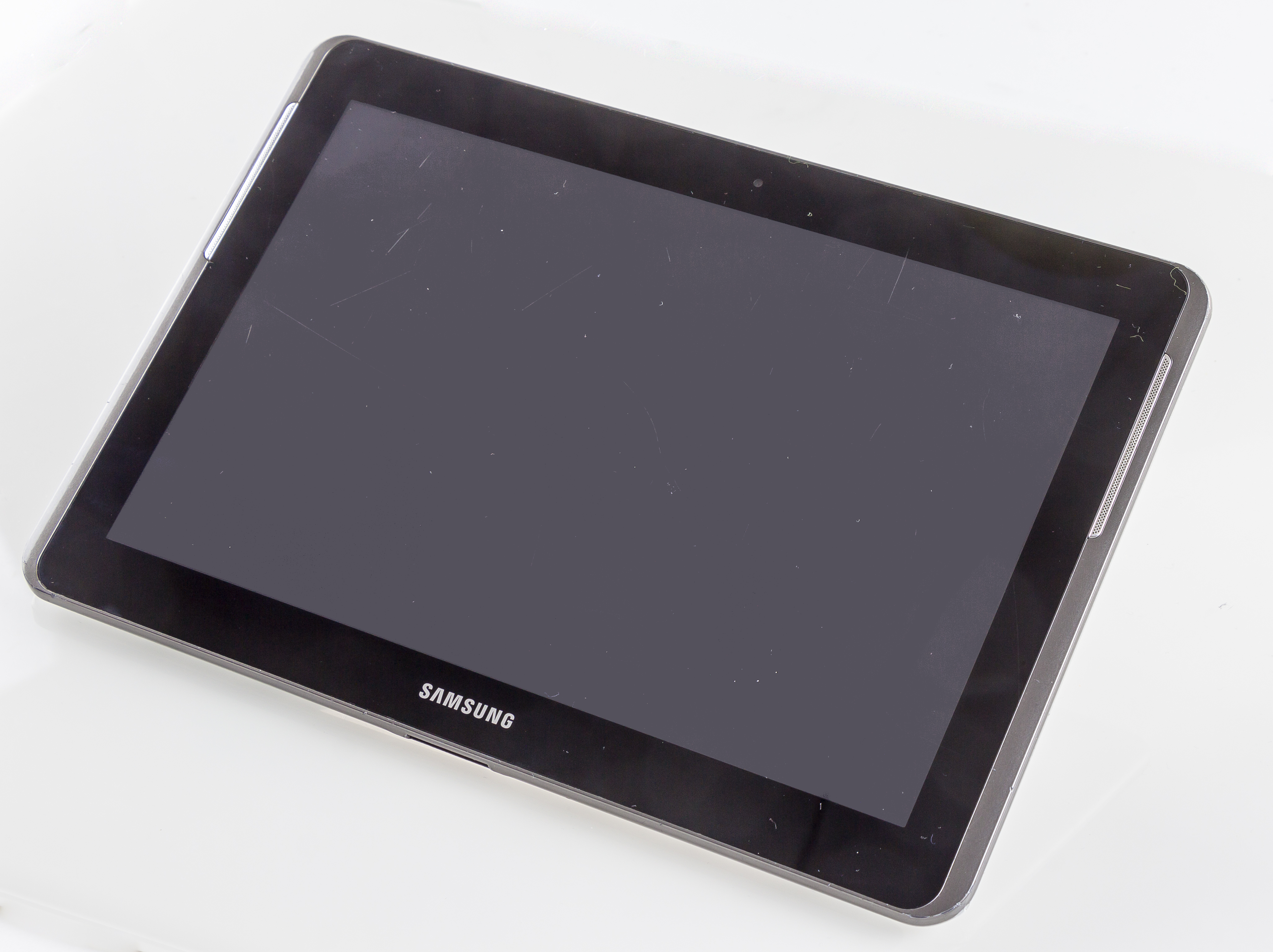
- Developer: Samsung
- Product family: Galaxy Tab
- Type: Tablet, media player, PC
- Released: April 2012
- Introductory price: $399 USD (16 GB)
- Operating system: Android 4.0.3 "Ice Cream Sandwich" (upgradable to Android 4.2.2 "Jelly Bean")
- CPU: 1.0 GHz TI OMAP4430 dual-core ARM Cortex-A9; SoC processor
- Memory: 1 GB (LPDDR2)
- Storage: 16/32 GB flash memory
- Removable storage: microSDXC slot (up to 32 GB)
- Display: 1280x800 px, 10.1 in (26 cm) diagonal, PLS TFT LCD Model: LTL101AL06-003 display
- Graphics: PowerVR SGX540
- Sound: Two speakers on the front
- Input: Multi-touch screen, digital compass, proximity and ambient light sensors, accelerometer
- Camera: 3.2 MP rear facing, VGA (0.3 MP) front facing
- Connectivity: HSPA+ 21 Mbit/s 850/900/1900/2100 MHz (3G & WiFi model); EDGE/GPRS 850/900/1800/1900 MHz (3G & WiFi model); Wi-Fi 802.11a/b/g/n, Bluetooth 3.0, HDMI (external cable)
- Power: 7,000 mAh Li-Ion battery
- Dimensions: 256.7 mm (10.11 in) H 175.3 mm (6.90 in) W 9.7 mm (0.38 in) D
- Weight: 583 g (1.285 lb)
- Model Number: GT-P5100
- Predecessor: Samsung Galaxy Tab 10.1
- Successor: Samsung Galaxy Tab 3 10.1
- Related: Samsung Galaxy Note 10.1
- Website: Website

The Samsung Galaxy Tab 2 10.1 is a 10.1-inch Android-based tablet computer produced and marketed by Samsung Electronics. It belongs to the second generation of the Galaxy Tab series, which also includes a 7-inch model, the Galaxy Tab 2 7.0. It was announced on 25 February 2012 and launched in the US on 13 May 2012. It is the successor to the Galaxy Tab 10.1.

== History ==
The Galaxy Tab 2 10.1 was announced on 25 February 2012. It was shown along with the Galaxy Tab 2 7.0 at the 2012 Mobile World Conference. Although the two devices were originally scheduled to launch in March, they did not do so, with Samsung explaining that the delay was due to unspecified problems with Ice Cream Sandwich. Samsung later confirmed that the Galaxy Tab 2 10.1 would be released in the US on 13 May, with a price of $399.99 for the 16GB model.

== Software ==
The Galaxy Tab 2 10.1 was originally released with Android 4.0.3 Ice Cream Sandwich including apps from Google and Samsung and the Samsung TouchWiz UX user interface. From 31 October 2013 Samsung released an upgrade to Android 4.2.2 Jelly Bean, both as an over-the-air (OTA) update and through Samsung Kies.

== Hardware ==
The Galaxy Tab 2 10.1 is available in WiFi-only and 3G & WiFi variants. Storage ranges from 16 GB to 32 GB depending on the model, with a microSDXC card slot for expansion up to 32 GB. It has a 10.1-inch PLS LCD screen with a resolution of 1280x800 pixel. It also features a VGA front camera without flash and 3.2 MP rear-facing camera. It also has the ability to record HD videos. It also has a Samsung 30-pin dock connector.

Preceded by Samsung Galaxy Tab 10.1	Samsung Galaxy Tab 2 10.1; 2012	Succeeded by Samsung Galaxy Tab 3 10.1
