= Samsung Galaxy Tab 3 8.0 =

Android tablet by Samsung

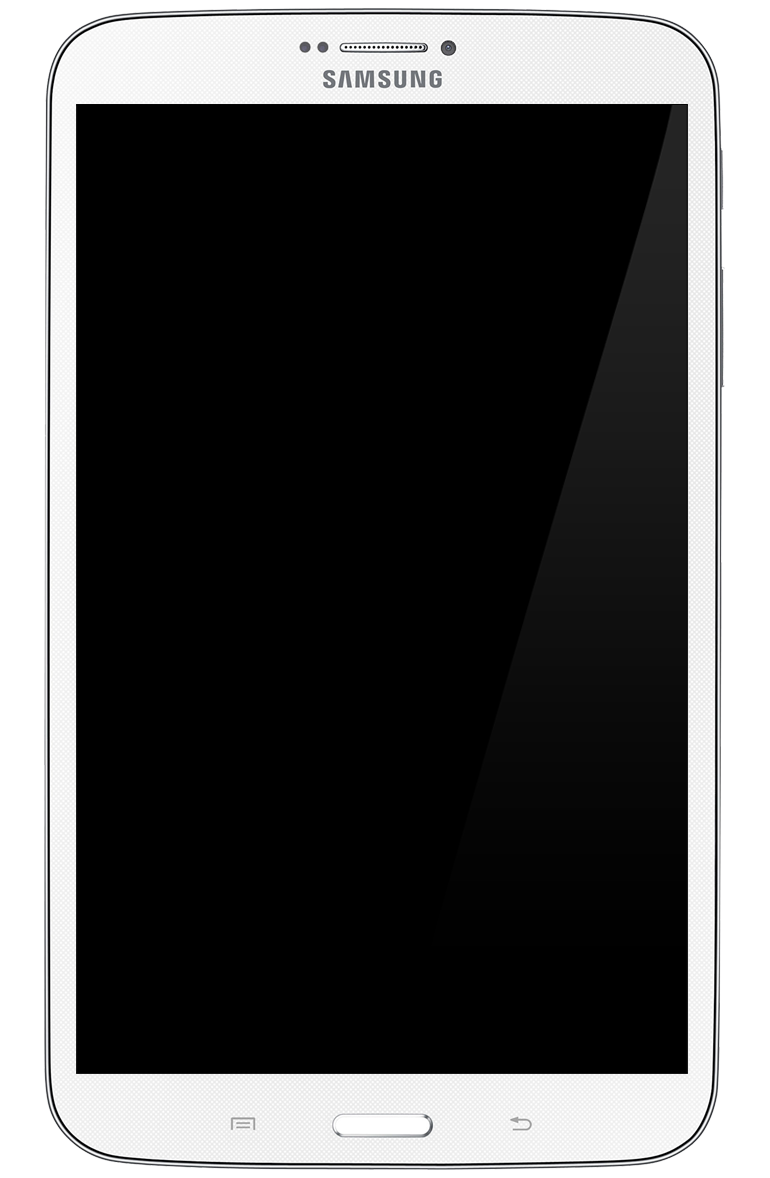
- Samsung Galaxy Tab 3 8.0 in White
- Also known as: SM-T310 (Wi-Fi); SM-T311 (3G & WiFi); SM-T315 (3G, 4G/LTE & Wi-Fi)
- Manufacturer: Samsung Electronics
- Product family: Galaxy Tab
- Type: Tablet, media player, PC
- Released: 7 July 2013 (US); 27 July 2013 (PH)
- Operating system: Android 4.2.2 "Jelly Bean" (upgradable to Android 4.4.2 "KitKat")
- System on a chip: Samsung Exynos 4 Dual processor
- CPU: 1.5 GHz dual core Samsung Exynos 4212 Dual SoC processor
- Memory: 1.5 GB RAM
- Storage: 16/32 GB flash memory, microSDXC slot (up to 64 GB)
- Display: 1280×800 px, 8.0 in (20 cm) diagonal, WXGA Super Clear LCD
- Graphics: Mali-400MP
- Input: Multi-touch screen, digital compass, proximity and ambient light sensors, accelerometer
- Camera: 5.0 MP AF rear-facing, 1.3 MP front-facing
- Connectivity: Cat3 100 / 50 Mbit/s hexa-band 800, 850, 900, 1800, 2100, 2600 MHz (4G, LTE model) HSPA+ 42, 5.76 Mbit/s 850, 900, 1900, 2100 MHz (4G, LTE model) HSPA+ 21, 5.76 Mbit/s quad 850, 900, 1900, 2100 MHz (3G, Wi-Fi model) EDGE/GPRS quad 850, 900, 1800, 1900 MHz (3G, Wi-Fi model) Wi-Fi 802.11a/b/g/n (2.4, 5 GHz), Bluetooth 3.0, HDMI (external cable)
- Power: 4,450 mAh Li-ion battery
- Dimensions: 209.8 mm (8.26 in) H 123.8 mm (4.87 in) W 7.4 mm (0.29 in) D
- Weight: Wi-Fi: 314 g (0.692 lb); 3G: 316 g (0.697 lb); 4G/LTE: 318 g (0.701 lb)
- Successor: Samsung Galaxy Tab 4 8.0
- Related: Samsung Galaxy Tab 3 7.0; Samsung Galaxy Tab 3 10.1; Samsung Galaxy Note 8.0
- Website: Microsite

The Samsung Galaxy Tab 3 8.0 is an 8-inch Android-based tablet computer produced and marketed by Samsung Electronics. It belongs to the third generation of the Samsung Galaxy Tab series, which also includes a 7-inch and a 10.1-inch model, the Galaxy Tab 3 7.0 and Galaxy Tab 3 10.1. It was launched in the US in July 2013. Unlike the 7-inch and 10.1 inch tablets, the Galaxy Tab 3 8.0 is a new size category of tablet in the Tab series and making its debut at this generation of Galaxy Tablets.

== History ==
The Galaxy Tab 3 8.0 was announced on 24 June 2013. It was shown along with the Galaxy Tab 3 7.0 and Galaxy Tab 3 10.1 at the 2013 Mobile World Conference. Samsung confirmed that the Galaxy Tab 3 8.0 would be released in the US on 7 July 2013 with a price of $299.99 for the 16 GB model.

== Features ==
The Galaxy Tab 3 8.0 was initially released with Android 4.2.2 Jelly Bean. It was expected as of the Summer 2013 release that an upgrade to Android 4.3 Jelly Bean would be made available in the future; however, the rumoured upgrade to Android 4.3 Jelly Bean has been skipped, while an upgrade to Android 4.4.2 KitKat released later in 2014. Samsung customized the interface with its TouchWiz UX software. As well as apps from Google, including Google Play, Gmail and YouTube, it has access to Samsung apps such as ChatON, S Suggest, S Voice, S Translator, S Planner, Smart Remote (Peel), Smart Stay, Multi-Window, Group Play, and All Share Play.

The Galaxy Tab 3 8.0 is available in WiFi-only, 3G & Wi-Fi, and 4G/LTE & Wi-Fi variants. Storage ranges from 16 GB to 32 GB depending on the model, with a microSDXC card slot for expansion. It has an 8-inch WXGA Super Clear LCD screen with a resolution of 1280x800 pixels. It also features a 1.3 MP front camera without flash and 5.0 MP AF rear-facing camera. It also has the ability to record HD (720p) videos.

== See also ==
- Samsung Galaxy Tab series
- Samsung Electronics
- Samsung Galaxy Tab 3 7.0
- Samsung Galaxy Tab 3 10.1
- Samsung Galaxy Note 8.0
