= Samsung Galaxy Tab 4 Education =

Android tablet by Samsung

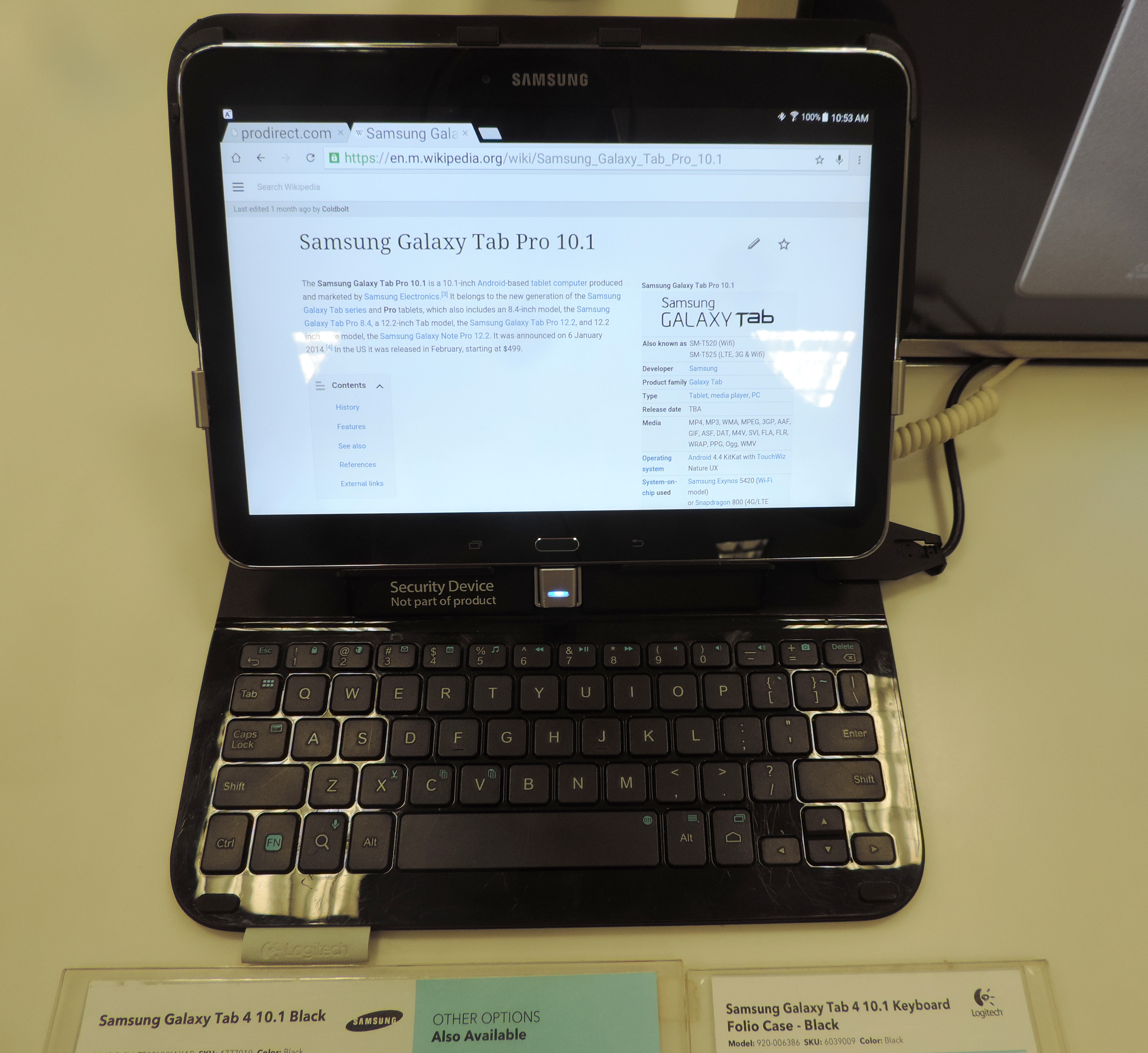
- Samsung Galaxy Tab 4 Education
- Developer: Samsung
- Type: Tablet, media player, PC
- Family: Galaxy Tab
- First released: May 2014
- Predecessor: Samsung Galaxy Tab
- Dimensions: 243.33 mm (9.580 in) H 176.27 mm (6.940 in) W 7.87 mm (0.310 in) D
- Weight: 490 g (17 oz) (1.08 lb)
- Operating system: Android 4.4.2 "KitKat" With; TouchWiz
- CPU: 1.2 GHz quad-core ARM
- GPU: No
- Memory: 1.5 GB
- Storage: 16 GB flash memory, microSD slot (up to 64 GB)
- Battery: 6,800 mAh Li-Ion battery
- Rear camera: Yes
- Display: 1280×800 px
- Connectivity: Wi-Fi 802.11a/b/g/n, Bluetooth 3.0, HDMI (external cable)
- Data inputs: Multi-touch screen, USB (adapter needed)

The Samsung Galaxy Tab 4 Education is a tablet computer in the Samsung Galaxy Tab series of tablets, announced and released by Samsung on May 16, 2014.

== Announcement ==
Samsung announced the tablet in a press release saying that "Samsung is committed to powering education by empowering educators". The initial price of the tablet is set at #369.99 and is available through Samsung partnered channels for the time being. A tablet computer that is based on the popular Google Android-based operating system was launched with students in mind. It belongs to the fourth generation of tablets and comes in a 10.1 inch screen.

== Specifications ==
Samsung has also announced that the device will support Google Play Store Education and will be compatible with Samsung School. With the support for multi-window, students would be able to do more in less time.

1.2 GHz ARM processor and a modest 1.5GB RAM makes the device snappy enough for the purpose it was created. A battery life of up to 10 hrs, the device would also be able to connect to a bigger monitor so that teacher can share a student's work with all the students in a classroom using HDMI port.

The device will come in a ruggedized rubber which will allow better grip and a tougher use. This was made with students in mind. Galaxy Tab 4 Education comes standard with 16GB memory, with a MicroSD Card Slot for up to 64GB of additional storage.
