= Samsung Galaxy Tab 4 7.0 =

Android tablet by Samsung

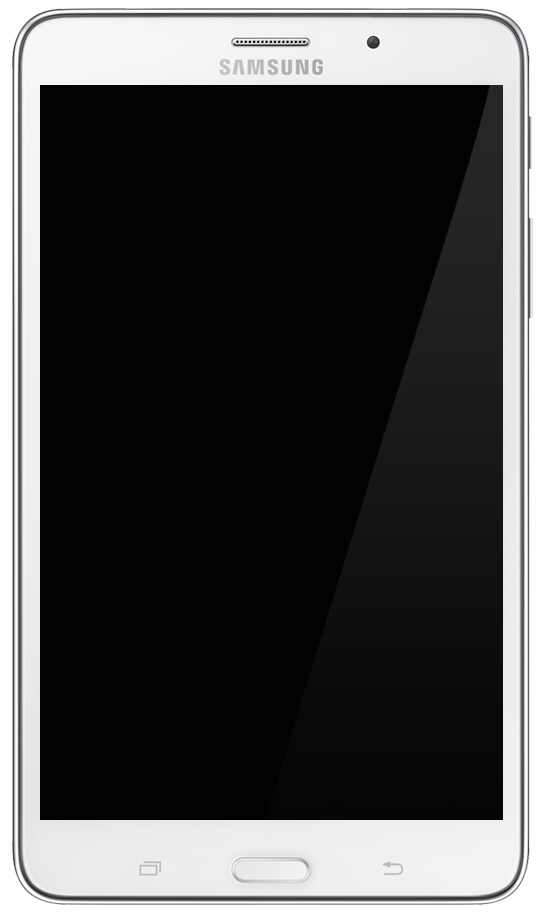
- Samsung Galaxy Tab 4 7.0 in White
- Codename: degas
- Also known as: SM-T230 (WiFi); SM-T231 (3G & WiFi); SM-T235 (3G, 4G/LTE & WiFi)
- Manufacturer: Samsung Electronics
- Product family: Galaxy Tab
- Type: Tablet, media player, PC
- Released: 1 May 2014
- Operating system: Android 4.4.2 KitKat SM-T235: Upgradeable to Android 5.1.1 "Lollipop" except Singapore
- System on a chip: SM-T231: Marvell PXA1088
- CPU: 1.2/1.4 GHz quad-core Cortex-A7
- Memory: 1.5 GB
- Storage: 8 GB flash memory, slot (up to 32/64 GB)
- Display: 1280×800 px, 7.0 in (18 cm) diagonal, WXGA TFT display
- Graphics: SM-T231: Vivante; SM-T235: Mali-400MP4
- Input: Multi-touch screen, digital compass, proximity and ambient light sensors, accelerometer
- Camera: 3.2 MP rear-facing 1.3 MP front-facing
- Connectivity: Cat3 100 / 50 Mbit/s hexa-band 800, 850, 900, 1800, 2100, 2600 MHz (4G, LTE model) HSPA+ 42, 5.76 Mbit/s 850, 900, 1900, 2100 MHz (4G, LTE model); HSPA+ 21, 5.76 Mbit/s quad 850, 900, 1900, 2100 MHz (3G, WiFi model); EDGE/GPRS quad 850, 900, 1800, 1900 MHz (3G, WiFi model) Wi-Fi 802.11a/b/g/n (2.4, 5 GHz), Bluetooth 4.0, HDMI (external cable)
- Power: 4,000 mAh Li-ion battery
- Dimensions: 186.9 mm (7.36 in) H 107.9 mm (4.25 in) W 8.0 mm (0.31 in) D
- Weight: WiFi: 274 g (0.604 lb); 3G: 276 g (0.608 lb); 4G/LTE: 278 g (0.613 lb)
- Predecessor: Samsung Galaxy Tab 3 7.0
- Successor: Samsung Galaxy Tab S2 8.0
- Related: Samsung Galaxy Tab 4 8.0; Samsung Galaxy Tab 4 10.1

The Samsung Galaxy Tab 4 7.0 is a 7-inch Android-based tablet computer produced and marketed by Samsung Electronics. It belongs to the fourth generation of the Samsung Galaxy Tab series, which also includes an 8-inch and a 10.1-inch model, the Galaxy Tab 4 8.0 and Galaxy Tab 4 10.1. It was announced on 1 April 2014 and was released on 1 May.

== History ==
The Galaxy Tab 4 7.0 was announced on 1 April 2014. It was shown along with the Galaxy Tab 4 8.0 and Galaxy Tab 4 10.1 ahead of the 2014 Mobile World Conference.

== Features ==
The Galaxy Tab 4 7.0 is released with Android 4.4.2 KitKat. Samsung has customized the interface with its TouchWiz UX software. As well as apps from Google, including Google Play, Gmail and YouTube, it has access to Samsung apps such as S Suggest, S Voice, S Planner, WatchON, Smart Stay, Multi-Window, Group Play, and All Share Play. only SM-T235 is upgradable to Android 5.1.1 Lollipop.

The Galaxy Tab 4 7.0 is available in WiFi-only, 3G & Wi-Fi, and 4G/LTE & WiFi variants. Storage ranges from 8, 16, or 32 GB depending on the model number, with a microSDXC card slot for expansion. It has a 7-inch WXGA TFT screen with a resolution of 1280x800 pixels (216ppi). It also features a 1.3 MP front camera and 3.2 MP rear-facing camera without autofocus/flash. It also has the ability to record HD videos in MP4 format.

USB OTG is only supported by the LTE version of the Samsung Galaxy Tab 4 7.0.

== Special editions ==
On 5 June 2014, it was announced jointly by both Samsung and Barnes & Noble that this tablet would be the foundation for the next Nook tablet. It is called the Samsung Galaxy Tab 4 Nook; it was launched and released for $199 on 21 August 2014.

== See also ==
- Samsung Galaxy Tab series
- Samsung Electronics
- Samsung Galaxy Tab 4 8.0
- Samsung Galaxy Tab 4 10.1
