= Samsung Galaxy Tab Active =

2014 mid-range rugged tablet computer by Samsung Electronics

Samsung Galaxy Tab Active Samsung Galaxy Tab Active LTE
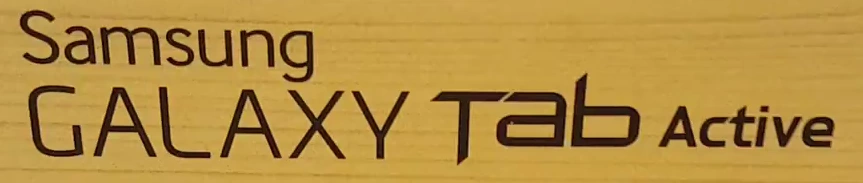
- Brand: Samsung
- Manufacturer: Samsung Electronics
- Type: Tablet computer
- Series: Galaxy Tab Active
- Family: Samsung Galaxy
- First released: September 4, 2014; 12 years ago
- Availability by region: November 2014; 11 years ago
- Successor: Samsung Galaxy Tab Active 5 Pro
- Compatible networks: WiFi/5G Only
- Form factor: Bar
- Color: Titanium Gray
- Weight: 393 (13.86)
- Operating system: Original: Android 4.4.2 "KitKat"; Current: Android 5.1.1 "Lollipop" with Magazine UX for TouchWiz Nature UX 3.0
- System-on-chip: Qualcomm Snapdragon 400 (28 nm)
- CPU: Quad-core 1.2 GHz Cortex-A7
- GPU: Adreno 305
- Battery: 4450 mAh
- Rear camera: 3.15 MP
- Front camera: 1.2 MP
- Water resistance: [[IP68] (up to 1.5m for 30 minutes)
- Model: Wi-Fi: SM-T360; LTE Cellular: SM-T365
- Development status: Active

The Samsung Galaxy Tab Active series is a mid-range rugged Android-based tablet computer manufactured, developed, produced and marketed by Samsung Electronics, and the first of the Galaxy Tab Active series. It was announced on September 4, 2014, and released in November 2014. Its current successor is Samsung Active5 and Samsung Active5 Pro.

It is designed for outdoor activities, and to withstand knocks and drops. It is also water and dust resistant.
