= Samsung Galaxy Tab A 8.0 =

Android tablet by Samsung

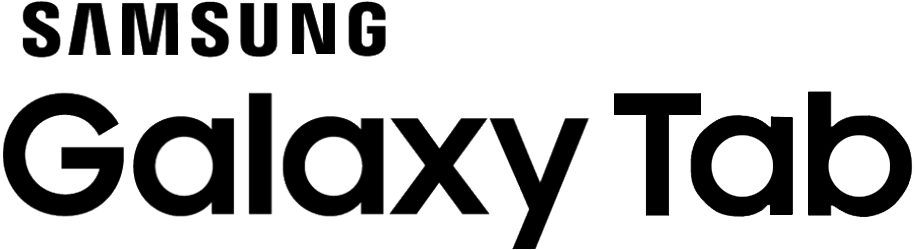
- Also known as: SM-T350 (WiFi); SM-P350 (WiFi w/ S-Pen); SM-T355 (3G, 4G/LTE & WiFi); SM-P355 (4G/LTE & WiFi w/ S-Pen); SM-T380 (WiFi); SM-T385 (2G, 3G, 4G/LTE & WiFi); SM-T387 (4G/LTE & WiFi); SM-P205 (4G/LTE & WiFi w/ S-Pen); SM-T290 (WiFi); SM-T295 (4G/LTE & WiFi); SM-T297 (4G/LTE & WiFi)
- Manufacturer: Samsung Electronics
- Product family: Galaxy Tab; Galaxy A
- Type: Tablet
- Released: 1 May 2015; 10 years ago
- Operating system: Original (Tab A 8.0): Android 5.0.2 "Lollipop" with TouchWiz Essence UX; Original (Tab A 8.0 2017 Edition): Android 7.1.1 "Nougat" with Samsung Experience 8.5; Original (Tab A 8.0 2018 Edition): Android 8.1 "Oreo" with Samsung Experience 9.5; Original (Tab A 8.0 2019 Edition): Android 9 "Pie" with One UI 1.1; Current (Tab A 8.0): Android 7.1.1 "Nougat" with Samsung Experience 8.5; Current (Tab A 8.0 2017 Edition): Android 9 "Pie" with One UI 1.0; Current (Tab A 8.0 2018 Edition): Android 10 with One UI 2.5; Current (Tab A 8.0 2019 Edition): Android 11 with One UI 3.1
- System on a chip: 2015: Qualcomm Snapdragon 410 APQ8016; 2017 & 2018: Qualcomm Snapdragon 425 MSM8917; 2019: Qualcomm Snapdragon 429
- CPU: 2015: Quad-Core 1.2 GHz ARM Cortex-A53; 2017/2018: Quad-Core 1.4 GHz ARM Cortex-A53 2019: Quad-Core 2 GHz ARM Cortex-A53
- Memory: 1.5 GB/2 GB (Wi-Fi); 2/3 GB (LTE)
- Storage: 16/32 GB flash memory, microSDXC slot (up to 512 GB)
- Display: 2015: 1024x768 px (160 ppi), 8.0 in (20 cm) diagonal, TFT LCD; 2017/2018/2019: 1280x800 px (188 ppi), 8.13 in (20.7 cm) diagonal, TFT LCD; TFT LCD
- Graphics: 2015: Adreno 306 GPU; 2017 & 2018: Adreno 308 GPU; 2019: Adreno 504 GPU
- Sound: Built-in stereo
- Input: Multi-touch screen, digital compass, proximity and ambient light sensors, accelerometer
- Camera: Rear: 5.0 MP AF, 1080p @ 30 fps (2017 & 2018 only), 720p @ 30 fps, 4x Digital Optical Zoom; Front: 2 MP, 720p @ 30 fps (2017 & 2018 only), 4x Digital Optical Zoom
- Connectivity: Cat3 100 Mbps DL, 50 Mbps UL Hexa-Band 800/850/900/1800/2100/2600 (4G/LTE model); HSDPA 42.2 Mbit/s, (4G/LTE & WiFi model); HSUPA 5.76 Mbit/s 850/900/1900/2100 (4G/LTE & WiFi model); EDGE/GPRS Quad 850/900/1800/1900 (4G/LTE & WiFi model); Wi-Fi 802.11a/b/g/n/ac (2.4 & 5GHz), Bluetooth 4.0 (2015/2016), Bluetooth 4.2 (2017 & 2018 & 2019)), HDMI (external cable)
- Power: 2015: 4,200 mAh Li-Ion battery 2017 & 2018: 5000 mAh Li-Ion battery 2019: 5100 mAh Li-Ion battery
- Dimensions: 208.3 mm (8.20 in) H 137.9 mm (5.43 in) W 7.4 mm (0.29 in) D
- Weight: WiFi: 313 g (0.690 lb); 4G/LTE: 317 g (0.699 lb)
- Successor: Samsung Galaxy Tab A7 Lite
- Related: Samsung Galaxy Tab S2 9.7; Samsung Galaxy Tab S2 8.0; Samsung Galaxy Tab A 9.7

The Samsung Galaxy Tab A 8.0 is an Android-based tablet computer produced and marketed by Samsung Electronics. It belongs to the mid-range "A" line, which also includes a 9.7 inch model, the Samsung Galaxy Tab A 9.7. It was announced in March 2015, and subsequently released on 1 May 2015. It is available in Wi-Fi–only and Wi-Fi/4G versions.

== History ==
The Galaxy Tab A 8.0 was announced together with the bigger Galaxy Tab A 9.7 in March 2015.

== Galaxy Tab A 8.0 (2015) ==
The Galaxy Tab A 8.0 (SM-T350, SM-P350, SM-T355, and SM-P355) was released with Android 5.0 Lollipop. Samsung has customized the interface with its TouchWiz software. As well as the standard suite of Google apps, it has Samsung apps such a S Planner Smart Stay, Multi-Window, Group Play, All Share Play, Samsung Magazine, Professional pack, Multi-user mode, SideSync 3.0.

The Galaxy Tab A 8.0 is available in Wi-Fi-only and 4G/LTE & Wi-Fi variants. Storage ranges from 16 GB to 32 GB depending on the model, with a microSDXC card slot for expansion up to 128 GB. It has an 8.0-inch TFT LCD screen with a resolution of 1024x768 pixels and a pixel density of 160 ppi. It also features a 2 MP front camera without flash and a rear-facing 5.0 MP AF camera without flash.

== Galaxy Tab A 8.0 (2017) ==
In October 2017, the 2017 version of the Galaxy Tab A 8.0 (SM-T380, SM-T385) was announced, with Android 7.1 Nougat (upgradeable to Android 8.1.0 Oreo and Android 9 Pie) and the Qualcomm Snapdragon 425 chipset, and made available on 1 November 2017.

== Galaxy Tab A 8.0 (2018) ==
In August 2018, the 2018 version of the Galaxy Tab A 8.0 (SM-T387) was announced, with Android 8.1 Oreo (upgradeable to Android 9 Pie and Android 10) and the Qualcomm Snapdragon 425 chipset, and made available on 7 September 2018. The Qualcomm Snapdragon 425 chipset carries over from the 2017 model.

== Galaxy Tab A 8.0 (2019) ==
The 2019 version of the Galaxy Tab A with S-Pen (SM-P200, only WiFi; and, SM-P205, WiFi and 4G/LTE) was announced in March 2019, and released a month later in April, 4 years after the 1st Galaxy Tab A with S Pen was released in 2015. It features Android 9 Pie (upgradeable to Android 11), Samsung Exynos 7904 processor, and the S Pen. In July, the 2019 version of the Galaxy Tab A 8.0 (SM-T290, SM-T295) was announced, with Android 9 Pie (upgradeable to Android 10 and Android 11) and the Qualcomm Snapdragon 429 chipset, and made available on 5 July 2019.

== Galaxy Tab A 8.0 Kids (2019) ==
In October 2019, a kids version called "Tab A Kids" was announced and released. It is essentially the same tablet but with a bumper case for protection.

== See also ==
- Comparison of tablet computers
