= Samsung Galaxy Tab =

Tablet computer series by Samsung

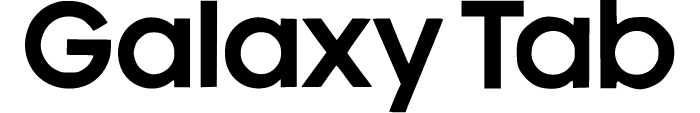
- Logo used since 2015

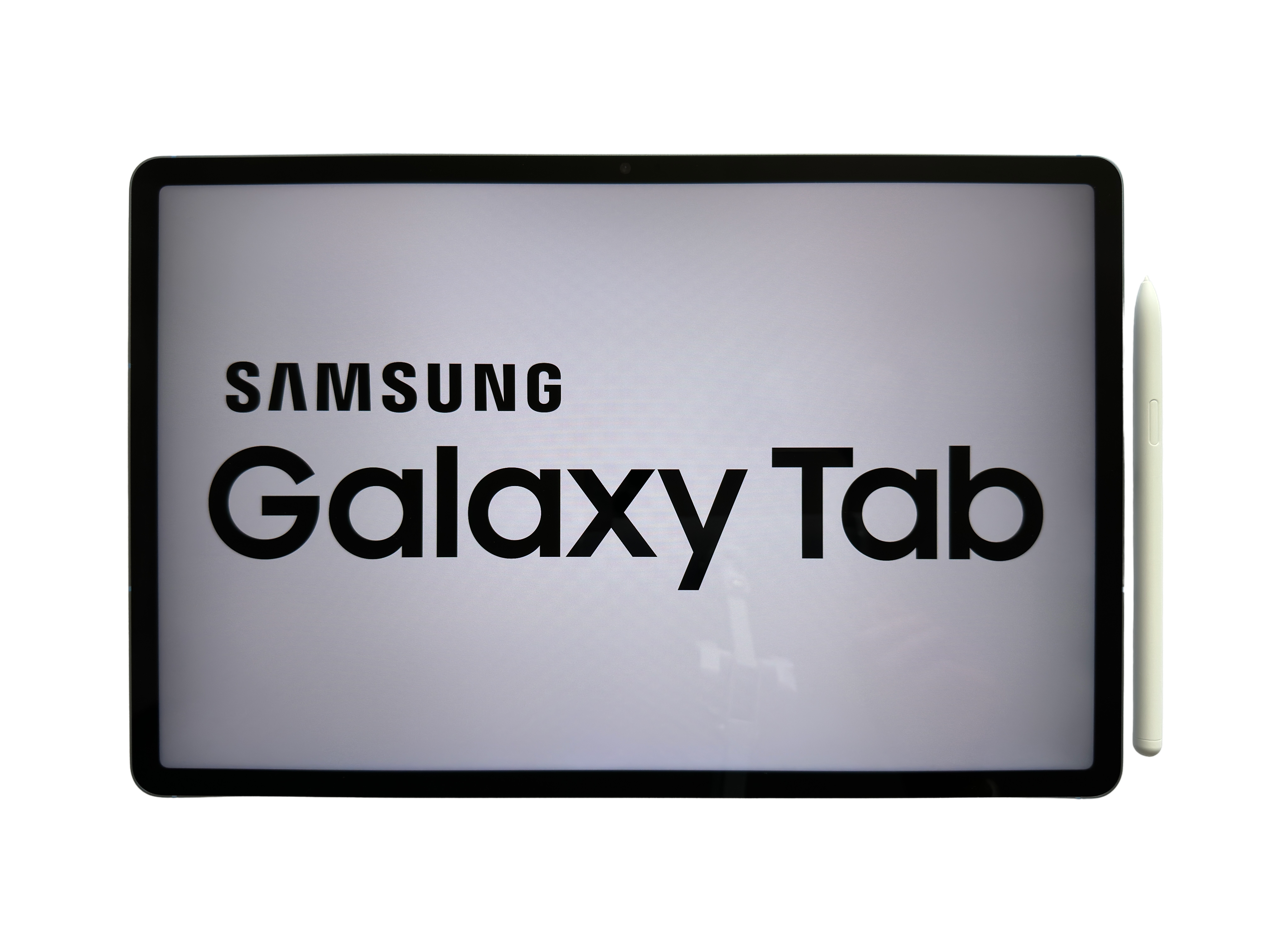
- Manufacturer: Samsung Electronics
- Product family: Galaxy Tab S (flagship); Galaxy Tab A (mid-range)
- Type: Tablet computers
- Released: 5 November 2010; 16 years ago
- Operating system: Android
- System on a chip: Samsung Exynos (2010–2020, 2024–present); Nvidia Tegra (2011–2012); Intel Atom (2013–2016); Qualcomm Snapdragon (2012–present); MediaTek Helio and Dimensity (2021–present); Unisoc (2016–present)
- Input: Touchscreen; Book Cover Keyboard; Stylus
- Touchpad: Included on Tab S series' Book Cover Keyboard
- Related: Samsung Galaxy S series Samsung Galaxy Z series Samsung Galaxy Note
- Website: Galaxy Tab

The Samsung Galaxy Tab logo until 2015

The Samsung Galaxy Tab is a line of Android-based tablet computers produced and developed by Samsung Electronics. The first model was the Samsung Galaxy Tab 2010 with 7-inch display, which was presented to the public on 2 September 2010 at the IFA in Berlin and was available on 5 November 2010. Since then, several models have been released, including models with varying display sizes. There would also be multiple connectivity options being sold, Wi-Fi only versions and Wi-Fi + Cellular options (either LTE or 5G).

In 2014, the Galaxy Tab series was later split into four separate lines:

- the Galaxy Tab S series for high-end tablets
- the Galaxy Tab Active series for rugged business focused tablets
- the Galaxy Tab A series for mid-range tablets (since 2015)
- the Galaxy Tab E series for entry-level tablets

Further changes saw the Galaxy Tab A series repositioned to entry-level (after the discontinuation of the Tab E lineup) and the S series extending to mid-range (with the introduction of the FE and Lite models). The Galaxy Tab S and Tab Active support the S Pen since Galaxy Tab S3.

== Current line-up ==
=== Galaxy Tab S ===
The Galaxy Tab S series is Samsung's mid-range to flagship tablet line, running the Android operating system and mirroring the Galaxy S series of smartphones. It expanded in the mid-range line with the release of the Lite and FE models.

=== Galaxy Tab A ===
The Galaxy Tab A series is a low-end (previously mid-range) tablet line, mirroring the Galaxy A series of mid-range smartphones. This series is the successor to the Galaxy Tab 4 lineup and also replaced the Galaxy Tab E lineup.

=== Galaxy Tab Active ===
Release timeline
2014	Samsung Galaxy Tab Active
2014	Samsung Galaxy Tab Active LTE
2015
2016
2017	Samsung Galaxy Tab Active 2
2018
2019	Samsung Galaxy Tab Active Pro
2020	Samsung Galaxy Tab Active 3
2021
2022	Samsung Galaxy Tab Active 4 Pro
2023
2024	Samsung Galaxy Tab Active 5
2025	Samsung Galaxy Tab Active 5 Pro

The Samsung Galaxy Tab Active series is a line of mid-range rugged tablets designed for outdoor use, mirroring the Galaxy Xcover series. Applications include logistics, construction, and first response.

==== 2014 ====
- Samsung Galaxy Tab Active
- Samsung Galaxy Tab Active LTE

==== 2017 ====
- Samsung Galaxy Tab Active 2

==== 2019 ====
- Samsung Galaxy Tab Active Pro

==== 2020 ====
- Samsung Galaxy Tab Active 3

==== 2022 ====
- Samsung Galaxy Tab Active 4 Pro

==== 2024 ====
- Samsung Galaxy Tab Active 5

==== 2025 ====
- Samsung Galaxy Tab Active 5 Pro

== Former lineup ==
=== Galaxy Tab ===
The original Galaxy Tab series was the first line of Samsung tablets. Initially, it was the flagship line of tablets before being relegated to mid-range upon the release of the Galaxy Tab 2 series.

==== Original Galaxy Tab (2010–2011) ====
Model		Tab 7.0	Tab 7.0 Plus	Tab 7.7	Tab 8.9	Tab 10.1
Support status		Unsupported				
Dates	Announced	2 September 2010	August 2011	1 September 2011	22 March 2011	13 February 2011
Dates	Released	5 November 2010	13 November 2011	January 2012	2 October 2011	June 2011
OS	Initial	TouchWiz 3.0; Android 2.2.1	TouchWiz; Android 3.1	TouchWiz; Android 3.2	TouchWiz; Android 3.0	
OS	Latest	TouchWiz 3.0; Android 2.3.6	TouchWiz; Android 4.1	TouchWiz; Android 4.1.2	TouchWiz; Android 3.1	TouchWiz; Android 4.0
Dimensions mm (in)	Height	190.09 (7.48)	193.7 (7.63)	196.7 (7.74)	230.9 (9.09)	256.7 (10.11)
Dimensions mm (in)	Width	120.45 (4.74)	122.4 (4.82)	133 (5.24)	157.8 (6.21)	175.3 (6.90)
Dimensions mm (in)	Depth	11.98 (0.47)	9.9 (0.39)	7.9 (0.31)	8.6 (0.34)	
Weight g (lb)		380 (0.84)	345 (0.76)	340 (0.75)	447.9 (0.99)	560 (1.23)
Colors						
Display	Size	7 in (180 mm)		7.7 in (200 mm)	8.9 in (230 mm)	10.1 in (260 mm)
Display	Resolution	1024 × 600		1280 × 800		
Display	Refresh Rate	60 Hz				
Display	Type	Super TFT	PLS LCD	SuperAMOLED Plus	PLS LCD	
Rear camera		3.2 MP	3.15 MP			
Front camera		1.3 MP	2 MP			
RAM		444 MB; 512 MB	1 GB			
Storage		16 GB	16 GB; 32 GB	16 GB; 32 GB; 64 GB		
Processor		Samsung; Exynos 3110	Samsung; Exynos 4210		Nvidia; Tegra 2 T20	
Battery (in mAh)		4000		5100	6000	7000

==== Galaxy Tab 2 (2012) ====
Model		Tab 2 7.0	Tab 2 10.1
Support status		Unsupported	
Dates	Announced	26 February 2012	
Dates	Released	March 2012	
OS	Initial	TouchWiz; Android 4.0.3	
OS	Latest	TouchWiz; Android 4.2.2	
Dimensions mm (in)	Height	193.7 (7.63)	256.6 (10.10)
Dimensions mm (in)	Width	122.4 (4.82)	175.3 (6.90)
Dimensions mm (in)	Depth	10.5 (0.41)	9.7 (0.38)
Weight g (lb)		345 (0.76)	581 (1.28)
Colors			
Display	Size	7 in (180 mm)	10.1 in (260 mm)
Display	Resolution	1024 × 600	1280 × 800
Display	Refresh Rate	60 Hz	
Display	Type	PLS LCD	
Rear camera		3.15 MP	
Front camera		VGA	
RAM		1 GB	
Storage		8 GB; 16 GB; 32 GB	
Processor		Texas Instruments; OMAP 4430	
Battery (in mAh)		4000	7000

==== Galaxy Tab 3 (2013–2015) ====
Model		Tab 3 7.0	Tab 3 8.0	Tab 3 10.1	Tab 3 Lite 7.0	Tab 3 V	Tab 3 VE
Support status		Unsupported					
Dates	Announced	April 2013	June 2013		18 January 2014	March 2015	
Dates	Released	July 2013			February 2014	April 2015	
OS	Initial	TouchWiz; Android 4.1.2	TouchWiz; Android 4.2.2			TouchWiz; Android 4.4	
OS	Latest	TouchWiz; Android 4.4.2			TouchWiz; Android 4.2.2	TouchWiz; Android 4.4.2	
Dimensions mm (in)	Height	188 (7.40)	209.8 (8.26)	243.1 (9.57)	193.4 (7.61)		
Dimensions mm (in)	Width	111.1 (4.37)	123.8 (4.87)	176.1 (6.93)	116.4 (4.58)		
Dimensions mm (in)	Depth	9.9 (0.39)	7.4 (0.29)	8 (0.31)	9.7 (0.38)		
Weight g (lb)		345 (0.76)	314 (0.69)	510 (1.12)	310 (0.68)		
Colors							
Display	Size	7 in (180 mm)	8 in (200 mm)	10.1 in (260 mm)	7 in (180 mm)		
Display	Resolution	1024 × 600	1280 × 800		1024 × 600		
Display	Refresh Rate	60 Hz					
Display	Type	TFT			TFT		
Rear camera		3.15 MP	5 MP	3.15 MP	2 MP		
Front camera		1.3 MP				2 MP	
RAM		1 GB	1.5 GB	1 GB	1 GB		
Storage		8 GB; 16 GB; 32 GB	16 GB; 32 GB		8 GB		
Processor		Marvell; PXA986	Exynos; 4212 Dual	Intel; Atom Z2560	Marvell; PXA986	UNISOC; SC8830	
Battery (in mAh)		4000	4450	6800	3600		

==== Galaxy Tab 4 (2014) ====
Model		Tab 4 7.0	Tab 4 8.0	Tab 4 10.1/Tab 4 Education
Support status		Unsupported		
Dates	Announced	April 2014		
Dates	Released	May 2014	June 2014	
OS	Initial	TouchWiz; Android 4.4.2		
OS	Latest	TouchWiz; Android 5.1.1		
Dimensions mm (in)	Height	186.9 (7.36)	210 (8.27)	243.4 (9.58)
Dimensions mm (in)	Width	107.9 (4.25)	124 (4.88)	176.4 (6.94)
Dimensions mm (in)	Depth	9 (0.35)	8 (0.31)	
Weight g (lb)		276 (0.61)	320 (0.71)	487 (1.07)
Colors				
Display	Size	7 in (180 mm)	8 in (200 mm)	10.1 in (260 mm)
Display	Resolution	1280 × 800		
Display	Refresh Rate	60 Hz		
Display	Type	TFT		
Rear camera		3.15 MP		
Front camera		1.3 MP		
RAM		1.5 GB		
Storage		8 GB	16 GB; 32 GB	
Processor		Marvell; PXA1088	Qualcomm; Snapdragon 400	
Battery (in mAh)		4000	4450	6800

==== Galaxy Tab Q (2014) ====
Galaxy Tab Q (SM-T2558), known as Galaxy W in South Korea. Exclusive to China Mobile and China Unicom. SK Telecom in South Korea. Thinner bezels, fake leather back panel, 2GHz quad-core cpu, 1.5gb ram, 16gb storage, microSD, 8MP rear camera, 2MP front camera, 4G LTE-A, 3200mah, Android 4.3, 245g, black, red and white.

=== Galaxy Tab Pro ===
The original Galaxy Tab Pro devices, released in 2014, were a series of three high-end tablets running the Android operating system. These tablets would be succeeded by the Galaxy Tab S series. In 2016, Samsung released another device in the Tab Pro line, the Galaxy TabPro S, although that tablet ran Windows 10 instead of Android. It was succeeded by the Samsung Galaxy Book the following year.

Model		Tab Pro 8.4	Tab Pro 10.1	Tab Pro 12.2	TabPro S
Support status		Unsupported			
Dates	Announced	6 January 2014			6 January 2016
Dates	Released	February 2014	March 2014		February 2016
OS	Initial	TouchWiz; Android 4.4.2			Windows 10
OS	Latest	TouchWiz; Android 5.1.1			Windows 10
Dimensions mm (in)	Height	219 (8.62)	243.1 (9.57)	295.4 (11.63)	290.3 (11.43)
Dimensions mm (in)	Width	128.5 (5.06)	171.4 (6.75)	203.7 (8.02)	198.8 (7.83)
Dimensions mm (in)	Depth	7.2 (0.28)	7.3 (0.29)	7.9 (0.31)	6.3 (0.25)
Weight g (lb)		WiFi only: 331 (0.73) with Cellular variant: 335 (0.74)	WiFi only: 469 (1.03) with Cellular variant: 477 (1.05)	WiFi only: 730.2 (1.61) with Cellular variant: 732 (1.61)/740 (1.63)	WiFi only: 693 (1.53) with Cellular variant: 696 (1.53)
Colors					
Display	Size	8.4 in (210 mm)	10.1 in (260 mm)	12.2 in (310 mm)	12 in (300 mm)
Display	Resolution	2560 × 1600			2160 × 1440
Display	Refresh Rate	60 Hz			
Display	Type	Super clear LCD			SuperAMOLED
Rear camera		8 MP			5 MP
Front camera		2 MP			5 MP
RAM		2 GB		3 GB	4 GB; 8 GB
Storage		16 GB; 32 GB		32 GB; 64 GB	128 GB; 256 GB
Processor		Qualcomm; Snapdragon 800	Qualcomm; Snapdragon 800; Samsung; Exynos 5420 Octa		Intel; Core m3-6Y30
Battery (in mAh)		4800	8220	9500	5200

=== Galaxy Tab E ===
The Samsung Galaxy Tab E series is a line of entry-level tablets, mirroring the Galaxy E series of smartphones. It was later replaced with the Galaxy Tab A series.

=== Galaxy Note tablets ===
The Galaxy Note tablet series was a line of stylus tablets. It was the flagship tablet line from 2012 to 2014 and used to mirroring the Galaxy Note series of smartphones. it was succeeded by the Galaxy Tab S series as it bundled the S Pen in-box.

== See also ==
- Samsung Galaxy
- Samsung Galaxy Book
- Samsung Galaxy S series
- Samsung Galaxy A series
- Samsung Galaxy Note series
- Samsung Galaxy Tab S series
- Android OS
- Tablet PC
- Barnes & Noble Nook (Samsung Galaxy Tab Nook)
- Windows
