= ChatON =

Mobile communication service

- Developer: Samsung Electronics
- Release: October 14, 2011; 15 years ago

Final release(s)
- Android: 3.5.701 / May 7, 2014; 12 years ago
- Web: 3.0 / August 21, 2013; 13 years ago
- iOS: 2.7.5 / November 18, 2013; 12 years ago
- BlackBerry: 1.10 / August 7, 2013; 13 years ago
- Windows Phone: 2.25 / November 13, 2013; 12 years ago
- bada: 1.9.0 / October 26, 2012; 14 years ago
- Windows Store: 2.0.51.41 / October 30, 2012; 14 years ago
/ July 31, 2014

Preview release(s)
- TouchWiz Nature UX 3.0
- Operating system: Android, iOS, BlackBerry, Windows Phone, bada, Windows Mobile, Web platform
- Available in: 62 languages
- Type: Instant messaging
- License: Freeware
- Website: web.samsungchaton.com

- Discontinued: 31 March 2015

ChatON was a global mobile communication service provided by Samsung Electronics from September 2011 to March 2015.

ChatON served more than 120 countries in 62 languages. ChatON was available on Android, iOS, BlackBerry, Windows Phone (Samsung Zone), Windows Mobile (Korea), and Bada smartphones. Additionally, a web client was offered for access to the service via web browsers. Users could invite and register buddies via Facebook and Twitter as well as share ChatON content on Facebook. Among ChatON's unique features were allowing users to create Animation messages, Broadcast to send personal notices in a group chat room, and the Trunk which stores media files shared in chats. When a user logs in ChatON, the user's buddy list is available on any connected device.

== History ==
ChatON was introduced at IFA on August 29, 2011, in Berlin, Germany, with initial service for iOS, Android, Blackberry, and Samsung phones. Support was expanded to include Android tablets, Windows Phone, and Bada phones. The ChatON mobile application could be downloaded from Samsung Apps & Google Play for Android, Apple AppStore for iOS, App World for Blackberry, and Microsoft Market for Windows Mobile.

On March 31, 2015, the ChatON service was discontinued in all markets.

== Devices ==
ChatON was installed by default on Samsung Galaxy smartphones and tablet PCs, such as Galaxy Pocket 2 and Galaxy Young 2 and Galaxy S Duos 3, Galaxy Gear, Galaxy Star 2, S5 Mini, and S5, and Galaxy Camera. It was also available on other devices depending on the installed operating system.

== Operating system support ==
For mobile devices, ChatON was available on Android (v2.2 or higher), Bada (v2.0 or higher), iOS (v4.3 or higher), BlackBerry (touch devices with v6.0 or higher, non-touch devices with v5.0 or higher), and Windows Mobile (v6.5 only for Omnia 2, and v7.0 for devices made by Samsung).

For Windows PC, ChatON runs on PCs with Windows XP or higher. For Macs, it runs on OS X 10.6 or higher.

=== Web version ===
ChatON offered a website client to enable users without a supported smartphone platform to chat via desktop and mobile web browsers. Multiple windows on PC screen, which is wider than mobile, facilitated chat with buddies and share contents. Usage of the web client was tied to a Samsung account instead of a phone number, and buddy lists from mobile accounts could be imported to the web client. Users received the same messages regardless of version while they maintained their web and mobile version's profiles independently. If a user deleted his account, his or her devices that were connected through the account are initialized and all data of chat room and server was deleted.

== Features ==
The ChatON service has been discontinued by Samsung since 2015. When it was still available, it provided services such as voice/video chatting, translation, PostON, Anicon, Animessage, SMS/MMS exchanging feature, as well as basic services such as buddy registration, chatting and multimedia sharing.

- Buddies: Buddies are automatically added based on the user's contact list. A phone number is registered as a buddy on ChatON. Only ChatON users are added as a buddy.
- Translation: Translation service is provided in 1:1 chat rooms. Korean, English, Chinese, Japanese is cross-translated to each other, and German, French, Spanish, Italian, Portuguese is translated into English or English translated into these languages. Users can set translation service by pushing the menu button in chat room or translate directly into any language they want by long pressing a message bubble. Receivers see translated messages only, and senders see original and translated messages altogether. This service is available on Galaxy S4 and the other devices that have S Translator.
- Anicons: Anicons, or animated icons, are the ChatON version of stickers. Unlike other apps, all ChatON stickers are animated. Anicons are available in the ChatON Shop. Many anicons feature fun characters to help express different emotions and situations to buddies. As of May 2013, 127 sets of Anicon are available to download for free.
- Animessage: Users can make and send short animations with background, text, image, hand writing and stamps. Various background templates and stamps are available to download. An animation that plays images and texts are sent to a receiver in the order of compiling. It is also sent as a stationary image.
- Group Chat: One-on-One and group chat are available. A group chat room is created if a user invites buddies during 1:1 chatting. A 1:1 chat room is created if a user sends a whisper during group chatting, and if the receiver answers to the whisper. Whisper is different from group chat in that a user is able to send a message individually to someone joined in the group chat. Also, users can set push alarms for every chat room.
- Multimedia Messaging: Various multimedia such as text, image, video, voice message, location, contact and calendars can be shared. JPEG and PNG formats are available for image files, and MP4, 3GP, MOV formats for video files. MOV files were not supported on Android, Bada, and BlackBerry devices.
- Video Calls: Users can use video chat using front and back cameras together. Both a user's face and the scene the user is seeing are shown simultaneously. A user can share his mobile screen with other buddies by pushing the share screen button during a video chat. Other buddies who participate in group chat are also available to control the shared screen remotely. A user can put moving emoticons on his face, overlay cartoon view and theme view, such as the mustache frame, during a video chat.
- Theme Customization: On Android (ChatON 3.0 or later) and Bada devices, users can download various font styles for free and apply them in the chat room. There are 22 font styles according to four language categories; Korean, Chinese, Latin, Arabic. If a user types '#' before all sentences of message, text size is increased when it is sent.
- SMS/MMS Integration: Users can exchange SMS/MMS through ChatON and users don't have to turn ChatON off to send a message to a non-ChatON user. ChatON users can send a message directly through ChatON to all of his or her buddies whose numbers are registered. Also, the user can have a more expressive dialogue with ChatON's Anicons and Emoticons which can be sent through MMS.
- Multimedia Files: Multimedia files such as images and videos that are shared in chat room are automatically saved in the Trunk. All participants in the chat room can access those saved files. The files are shown as thumbnails and sorted in order of recent comments or updates. If chatting members tap a file, then it moves to the detail view and they can leave comments on it. They can also share it on Facebook.
- PostON: In the ChatON profile page, users can post short messages or comments. Even if a buddy is not connected with ChatON, users can post under the profile. Users can send up to 140 texts, but not images or videos.
- LIVEpartner: LIVEpartners related to life, travel, fashion, cars and news deliver news if a user adds them as buddies. These service providers provide more details about the news on their external sites. As of May 2013, there were 52 LIVEpartners available.

An API is available from Samsung for developing software that communicates with ChatON over an HTTPS connection.

== See also ==
- Comparison of cross-platform instant messaging clients
- Comparison of instant messaging protocols
- Comparison of Internet Relay Chat clients
- Comparison of LAN messengers
- Comparison of VoIP software
- List of SIP software
- List of video telecommunication services and product brands
