= Evolved High Speed Packet Access =

Enhanced 3G mobile telecommunications standard

HSPA+ indicator in a Samsung Galaxy smartphone.

An HSPA+ indicator in the notification bar of an Android smartphone.

Evolved High Speed Packet Access, better known as HSPA+, HSPA (Plus) or HSPAP, is a technical standard for wireless broadband telecommunication. It is an evolution of the earlier HSPA standard. The 3rd Generation Partnership Project (3GPP), a mobile telecommunications standards organization, specified HSPA+ in its Release 7 and later versions. HSPA+ provides higher data rates than the original HSPA, with theoretical speeds of up to 42.2 Mbit/s on the downlink.

HSPA+ is considered an evolution of 3G technology, sometimes denoted as 3.75G. It allows an upgrade to existing 3G networks to provide speeds closer to newer 4G networks without requiring a completely new radio interface. For this reason, HSPA+ should not be confused with Long Term Evolution (LTE), a true 4G technology which uses a different air interface based on OFDMA and follows a separate technological evolution path.

To achieve higher data rates, HSPA+ introduces advanced antenna technologies like beamforming and multiple-input multiple-output (MIMO). Beamforming is a signal processing technique that focuses the wireless signal from a base station towards a specific receiving device, rather than spreading it in all directions. This signal concentration results in better reception and improved data speeds. MIMO increases throughput by using multiple antennas on both the transmitting (base station) and receiving (user's device) ends to send and receive multiple data streams at once. Further releases of the standard introduced dual carrier operation, which allows a device to communicate over two separate 5 MHz frequency bands simultaneously, effectively doubling the bandwidth.

Advanced HSPA+ is a further evolution that provides theoretical peak download speeds up to 168 Mbit/s and upload speeds up to 22 Mbit/s. This performance is achieved through techniques like using a more complex modulation method (such as 64-QAM), which encodes more data into each transmission, or by combining multiple radio carriers with features like Dual-Cell HSDPA.

== Downlink ==
Cellular network standards and generation timeline.

The downlink refers to the connection from the cellular network to the user's device. HSPA+ improves downlink speeds through several key technologies.

=== Evolved HSDPA (HSPA+) ===
An Evolved HSDPA network can achieve theoretical maximum speeds of 28 Mbit/s and 42 Mbit/s using a single 5 MHz carrier. These speeds are made possible by combining MIMO (in Release 7) with a more efficient modulation scheme, 64-QAM (in Release 8). This combination improves throughput, especially for users with good signal conditions. Quality of service can also be improved for users with poorer reception through techniques like diversity and joint scheduling.

=== Dual-Carrier HSDPA (DC-HSDPA) ===
Dual-Carrier HSDPA, also known as Dual-Cell HSDPA, is part of 3GPP Release 8. It allows a mobile device to receive data from two 5 MHz carriers simultaneously. By aggregating the bandwidth of two carriers (for a total of 10 MHz), DC-HSDPA can double the potential data rate compared to a single-carrier connection. This achieves better resource utilization and spectrum efficiency through joint resource allocation and load balancing across the downlink carriers.

New User Equipment categories 21-24 were introduced to support DC-HSDPA, enabling theoretical speeds of up to 42.2 Mbit/s without relying on MIMO technology.

Later releases allow for even greater speeds. Release 9 allows the combined carriers to be in different frequency bands. It also allows DC-HSDPA to be used in combination with MIMO on both carriers, pushing theoretical speeds to 84.4 Mbit/s. Releases from 10 onwards allow for the aggregation of up to four carriers.

=== User Equipment (UE) Categories ===
The following table, derived from table 5.1a of 3GPP TS 25.306 (Release 11), shows the maximum data rates of different device classes and the combination of features used to achieve them. The per-cell, per-stream data rate is limited by the Maximum number of bits of an HS-DSCH transport block received within an HS-DSCH TTI and the Minimum inter-TTI interval. The TTI is 2 ms. For example, a Category 10 device can decode 27,952 bits every 2 ms, resulting in a data rate of 13.976 Mbit/s (not 14.4 Mbit/s as is often claimed). Categories 1–4 and 11 have inter-TTI intervals of 2 or 3, which reduces the maximum data rate by that factor. Dual-Cell and MIMO 2x2 each multiply the maximum data rate by 2 because they transmit multiple independent transport blocks over different carriers or spatial streams, respectively. The data rates in the table are rounded to one decimal place.

Evolved HSDPA User Equipment (UE) categories
Category	Release	Max. number of HS-DSCH codes (per cell)	Modulation (Note: 16-QAM implies QPSK support, 64-QAM implies 16-QAM and QPSK support.)	MIMO, Multi-Cell	Code rate at max. Data Rate (Note: The maximal code rate is not limited. A value close to 1 in this column indicates that the maximum data rate can be achieved only in ideal conditions. The device is therefore connected directly to the transmitter to demonstrate these data rates.)	Max. Downlink Speed (Mbit/s) (Note: The maximum data rates given in the table are physical layer data rates. Application layer data rate is approximately 85% of that, due to the inclusion of IP headers (overhead information) etc.)
13	7	15	64-QAM		.82	17.6
14	7	15	64-QAM		.98	21.1
15	7	15	16-QAM	MIMO 2x2	.81	23.4
16	7	15	16-QAM	MIMO 2x2	.97	28.0
17	7	15	64-QAM		.82	17.6
17	7	15	16-QAM	MIMO 2x2	.81	23.4
18	7	15	64-QAM		.98	21.1
18	7	15	16-QAM	MIMO 2x2	.97	28.0
19	8 (Note: Category 19 was specified in Release 7 as "For further use". Not until Release 8 were the simultaneous use of 64QAM and MIMO allowed to obtain the specified max. data rate.)	15	64-QAM	MIMO 2x2	.82	35.3
20	8 (Note: Category 20 was specified in Release 7 as "For further use". Not until Release 8 were the simultaneous use of 64QAM and MIMO allowed to obtain the specified max. data rate.)	15	64-QAM	MIMO 2x2	.98	42.2
21	8	15	16-QAM	Dual-Cell	.81	23.4
22	8	15	16-QAM	Dual-Cell	.97	28.0
23	8	15	64-QAM	Dual-Cell	.82	35.3
24	8	15	64-QAM	Dual-Cell	.98	42.2
25	9	15	16-QAM	Dual-Cell + MIMO 2x2	.81	46.7
26	9	15	16-QAM	Dual-Cell + MIMO 2x2	.97	55.9
27	9	15	64-QAM	Dual-Cell + MIMO 2x2	.82	70.6
28	9	15	64-QAM	Dual-Cell + MIMO 2x2	.98	84.4
29	10	15	64-QAM	Triple-Cell	.98	63.3
30	10	15	64-QAM	Triple-Cell + MIMO 2x2	.98	126.6
31	10	15	64-QAM	Quad-Cell	.98	84.4
32	10	15	64-QAM	Quad-Cell + MIMO 2x2	.98	168.8
33	11	15	64-QAM	Hexa-Cell	.98	126.6
34	11	15	64-QAM	Hexa-Cell + MIMO 2x2	.98	253.2
35	11	15	64-QAM	Octa-Cell	.98	168.8
36	11	15	64-QAM	Octa-Cell + MIMO 2x2	.98	337.5
37	11	15	64-QAM	Dual-Cell + MIMO 4x4	.98	168.8
38	11	15	64-QAM	Quad-Cell + MIMO 4x4	.98	337.5

== Uplink ==
The uplink refers to the connection from the user's device to the cellular network.

=== Dual-Carrier HSUPA (DC-HSUPA) ===
Dual-Carrier HSUPA, also known as Dual-Cell HSUPA, is the uplink equivalent of DC-HSDPA and was defined in 3GPP UMTS Release 9.

DC-HSUPA improves uplink performance by allowing the device to transmit on two adjacent 5 MHz carriers simultaneously. This carrier aggregation in the uplink allows for more efficient use of spectrum and resources through joint scheduling and load balancing across the carriers, leading to higher upload speeds. The standardization of Release 9 was completed in December 2009.

=== User Equipment (UE) Categories ===
The following table shows uplink speeds for the different categories of Evolved HSUPA.

Evolved HSUPA User Equipment (UE) categories
HSUPA Category	Release	Max. Uplink Speed (Mbit/s)	Modulation
7	7	11.5	QPSK & 16QAM
8	9	11.5	2 ms, dual cell E-DCH operation, QPSK only; (see 3GPP Rel 11 TS 25.306 table 5.1g)
9	9	22.9	2 ms, dual cell E-DCH operation, QPSK and 16QAM; (see 3GPP Rel 11 TS 25.306 table 5.1g)
10	11	17.25	2 ms, QPSK, 16QAM, and 64QAM; (see 3GPP Rel 11 TS 25.306 table 5.1g)
11	11	22.9	2 ms, uplink MIMO, QPSK and 16QAM; (see 3GPP Rel 11 TS 25.306 table 5.1g)
12	11	34.5	2 ms, uplink MIMO, QPSK, 16QAM, and 64QAM; (see 3GPP Rel 11 TS 25.306 table 5.1g)

== Multi-carrier HSPA (MC-HSPA) ==
The aggregation of more than two carriers has been standardized in later 3GPP releases. Release 11, finalized in Q3 2012, specifies 8-carrier HSPA (aggregating eight 5 MHz carriers), allowed in non-contiguous bands. When combined with 4 × 4 MIMO, this offers theoretical peak transfer rates up to 672 Mbit/s.

The speeds mentioned, such as 168 Mbit/s, represent theoretical peaks. The actual speed experienced by a user will be lower and depends on many factors, including radio conditions. HSPA+ typically offers its highest bitrates only in very good radio conditions (i.e., very close to the cell tower) or when the user's device and the network both support either MIMO or multi-carrier operation, which use different technical methods to create parallel data channels.

== All-IP architecture ==
An optional network design for HSPA+ is the flattened all-IP architecture. This design simplifies the network and reduces latency by streamlining the path that user data travels. In this architecture, the base stations (Node B) connect to the core network via the IP, using modern, cost-effective link technologies like xDSL or Ethernet.

Specifically, the user's data traffic flows directly from the base station to the Gateway GPRS Support Node (GGSN), which is the gateway to external packet data networks like the Internet. This bypasses the Radio Network Controller (RNC) and the Serving GPRS Support Node (SGSN) that were part of the original UMTS architecture. This simplification reduces equipment costs for operators and lowers the latency of data connections. The definition can be found in 3GPP technical report TR25.999. While the data path (the 'user plane') is flattened, the 'control plane', which handles functions like connection management, remains unchanged.

Nokia Siemens Networks' Internet HSPA (I-HSPA) was the first commercial solution to implement the Evolved HSPA flattened all-IP architecture.

== See also ==
- Comparison of wireless data standards
- High Speed Packet Access
- List of UMTS networks
