= Samsung Galaxy Tab 7.0 Plus =

Android tablet by Samsung

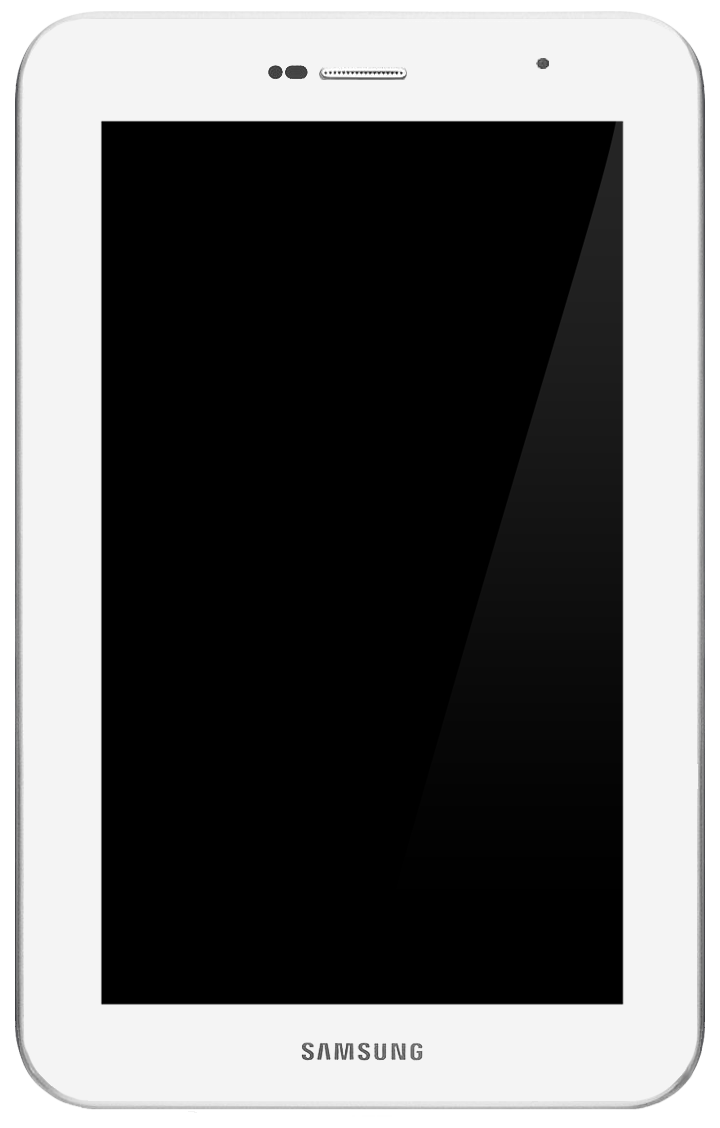
- Samsung Galaxy Tab 7.0 Plus in White
- Also known as: GT-P6200
- Developer: Samsung
- Type: Tablet, media player, PC
- Family: Galaxy Tab
- First released: November 2011
- Predecessor: Samsung Galaxy Tab 7.0
- Successor: Samsung Galaxy Tab 2 7.0
- Related: Samsung Galaxy S II; Samsung Galaxy Note series Samsung Galaxy Tab 7.7
- Dimensions: 193.65 mm (7.624 in) H 122.30 mm (4.815 in) W 9.9 mm (0.39 in) D
- Weight: 345 g (12 oz) (0.761 lb)
- Operating system: Android 3.2 "Honeycomb" upgradeable to 4.0.4 "Ice Cream Sandwich"
- CPU: 1.2 GHz dual-core ARM Cortex-A9 SoC processor Samsung Exynos 4210
- Memory: 1 GB
- Storage: 16/32/ GB flash memory, microSD slot (up to 32 GB)
- Rear camera: 3.0 MP AF camera with LED flash, 2.0 MP front-facing (for video calls)
- Display: 1024×600 px (1 megapixel), 7.0 in (18 cm) diagonal, 197 ppi, WSVGA PLS
- Connectivity: HSPA+ 21 Mbit/s 850/900/1900/2100 MHz; EDGE/GPRS 850/900/1800/1900 MHz; Wi-Fi 802.11a/b/g/n, Bluetooth 3.0, HDMI (external cable)
- Data inputs: Multi-touch screen, headset controls, proximity and ambient light sensors, 3-axis gyroscope, magnetometer, accelerometer, aGPS, USB (adapter needed)
- Website: www.samsung.com

The Samsung Galaxy Tab 7.0 Plus is a 7-inch Android tablet computer developed by Samsung Electronics. It was announced in August 2011 and serves as an upgraded version of the original Galaxy Tab. The device is known for its portability, solid performance, and access to a wide range of applications through the Android ecosystem.

== Overview ==
The tab belongs to the midlife first generation of the Samsung Galaxy Tab series, which consists of two 10.1" models, an 8.9", a 7.0", and a 7.7" model.

The Samsung Galaxy Tab 7.0 Plus is seen to be more of an update even by Samsung rather than a successor to the original Samsung Galaxy Tab 7.0.

== Features ==
The Galaxy Tab 7.0 Plus includes features such as:

- Connectivity: Wi-Fi 802.11 b/g/n, Bluetooth 3.0, optional 3G connectivity
- Sensors: Accelerometer, Compass
- Software: TouchWiz UX, Samsung Apps, support for Adobe Flash

== Reception ==
Upon release, the Galaxy Tab 7.0 Plus received generally positive reviews. Critics praised its lightweight design, improved performance over its predecessor, and high-quality display. However, some noted that the device faced stiff competition from other tablets in the market, particularly those running on Apple's iOS.

== Legacy ==
The Samsung Galaxy Tab 7.0 Plus contributed to the expansion of Samsung's tablet lineup and helped establish the brand's presence in the tablet market. It was succeeded by the Galaxy Tab 2 series, which offered improved specifications and additional features.
