= Samsung Galaxy Tab 7.7 =

Android tablet by Samsung

- Developer: Samsung
- Type: Tablet, media player, PC
- Family: Galaxy Tab
- First released: September 2011
- Predecessor: Samsung Galaxy Tab
- Successor: Samsung Galaxy Tab 3 8.0
- Related: Samsung Galaxy S II; Samsung Galaxy Note series Samsung Galaxy Tab 7.0 Plus; Samsung Galaxy Tab 2 7.0; Samsung Galaxy Tab 3 7.0
- Dimensions: 196.7 mm (7.74 in) H 133.0 mm (5.24 in) W 7.9 mm (0.31 in) D
- Weight: 340 g (12 oz) (0.75 lb)
- Operating system: Android 3.2 "Honeycomb" upgradable to Android 4.1.2 "Jelly Bean"
- CPU: 1.4 GHz dual-core ARM Cortex-A9 SoC processor Samsung Exynos 4210
- GPU: ARM Mali-400 MP
- Memory: 1 GB
- Storage: 16/32/64 GB flash memory, microSD slot (up to 32 GB)
- Battery: 5,100 mAh Li-Ion battery
- Rear camera: 3.0 MP AF camera with LED flash, 2.0 MP front-facing (for video calls)
- Display: 1280×800 px (1 megapixel), 7.7 in (20 cm) diagonal, 197 ppi, Super AMOLED Plus display
- Connectivity: HSPA+ 21 Mbit/s 850/900/1900/2100 MHz; EDGE/GPRS 850/900/1800/1900 MHz; Wi-Fi 802.11a/b/g/n, Bluetooth 3.0, HDMI (external cable)
- Data inputs: Multi-touch screen, headset controls, proximity and ambient light sensors, 3-axis gyroscope, magnetometer, accelerometer, aGPS, USB (adapter needed)
- Website: www.samsung.com/global/microsite/galaxytab/7.7

The Samsung Galaxy Tab 7.7 is a mini tablet computer of a series of Android-based tablet computer produced by Samsung, introduced on 1 September 2011 at IFA in Berlin. Related models are the Samsung Galaxy Tab 7.0 Plus, Samsung Galaxy Tab 2 7.0, and Samsung Galaxy Tab 3 7.0.

It belongs to the second generation of the Samsung Galaxy Tab series, which consists of two 10.1" models, an 8.9", a 7.0" and a 7.7" model. The 7.7 is the thinnest tablet Samsung has made in the 7" range.

== History ==
The Galaxy Tab 7.7 was shown to the public in September 2011 at the IFA in Berlin. It is, together with its cheaper sibling Galaxy Tab 7.0 Plus, the direct successor of the original Galaxy Tab.

On 4 January 2012, Samsung announced in Singapore the launch for February 2012 for S$898 (US$695).

The Galaxy Tab 7.7 Wi-Fi was on sale in Australia on 13 January 2012, with prices approximately A$550. The release was not advertised and only a few stores have stock.

After Apple had secured another injunction against Samsung tablet computers in Germany, Samsung had to pull the Tab 7.7 from their booth including everything related like posters only one day after the first presentation.

== Software ==
The Galaxy Tab 7.7 runs Android 3.2 "Honeycomb" with Samsung's custom overlay TouchWiz UX. TouchWiz UX provides several widgets and:

- L!ve Panels: A set of custom widgets and panels which will provide additional content to Honeycomb, like weather, calendar, and more. The widgets and panels are resizable, following a grid pattern.
- Mini Apps Tray: An additional dock-like bar which will give access to the most commonly used applications.
- Social Hub: An integrated messaging application which aims to center the user's social life, unifying the inboxes and timelines of multiple services like Gmail, Facebook, Twitter, and many others, splitting them into "Feeds" (updates) and "Messages".
- Reader's Hub: A store that will allow the user to download e-books to the Galaxy Tab. Samsung claims that it will feature around 2 million books, 2,000 newspapers in 49 languages, and 2,300 magazines in 22 languages.
- Media Hub: A video on demand service, which will be available only in the US.
- Music Hub: A music on demand service, which will be available only in the US.

In July 2012, an update to Android 4.0.4 (Ice Cream Sandwich) appeared in Austria. More countries followed in the next months.

In May 2013 Samsung released an update to Android 4.1.2 (Jelly Bean) in several Asian countries.

== Hardware ==
The Galaxy Tab 7.7 is the first tablet computer featuring a Super AMOLED Plus display and sports a high pixel density. The Samsung Exynos 4210 dual-core processor works at 1.4 GHz, it consists of two ARM Cortex-A9 cores. The Tab 7.7 is equipped with 1 GB LPDDR2 RAM and 16, 32, or 64 GB of built-in storage which can be expanded by a MicroSD card up to 32 GB

The Tab 7.7 is not technically related to the other Galaxy Tabs except the 7.0 Plus with which it shares almost everything apart from the screen and a slightly faster processor of the same type as used in the 7.7. The previously launched 8.9" and 10.1" Galaxy Tabs are equipped with a different (and slower) processor, different screen technology and they are not expandable by microSD cards. The original Galaxy Tab 7 is also different from every angle.

As with all Honeycomb tablets, the number of buttons has been reduced: The usual Home, Menu, Back, and Search buttons, which are present in most Android devices, are embedded in the notification and menu bar. The only physical buttons are Power, Volume Up, and Volume Down.

Like every other tablet from the Galaxy Tab series also the Tab 7.7 also comes with the Samsung PDMI-like proprietary interface connector, which is used for both charging and data transfer. A keyboard dock will be available as well as a charging/data dock with a microHDMI out connector.

The cameras used are well known from many other Galaxy Tabs, the 2 MP front-facing camera has a fixed focus and is designed to be used for video chat or self-portraits. The 3 MP rear camera features autofocus and an LED flash.

3G connectivity is supported in the P6800 models, dual Wi-Fi a/b/g/n antennas, which can operate at 2.4 and 5 GHz frequencies, are standard on all models.

The Galaxy Tab 7.7 offers full phone functionality with a phone-like receiver/mic arrangement, on the Wi-Fi-only versions it can still be used for VOIP calls. Wired or Bluetooth headsets can be used as well as speaker mode.

On almost every review device used by several tech blogs or magazines an infrared port for using the Tab 7.7 as a remote control for entertainment devices such) as TV sets or DVD players was fitted (and a suitable app installed) but apparently this is not the case on the production units. However, in the US, a Verizon-branded model does include the IR port.

== Galaxy Tab 2 ==
The Samsung Galaxy Tab 2 (7.0) is a newer model (summer 2012) of the 7.0 Plus. It is equipped with Android 4.0, is available with 8 GB internal storage, and comes with the infrared smart remote control IR Blaster.

== Galaxy Tab 3 ==
The Samsung Galaxy Tab 3 (7.0) is the newest model (summer 2013) of the Tab 2 7.0. It is equipped with Android 4.2, is available with 8 GB internal storage and comes with the infrared smart remote control IR Blaster.

== Model comparison ==
	Type#	OS	Network	Display	CPU	RAM	Camera		Video	Audio	Wi-Fi	Bluetooth	Storage		Height	Width	Thickness	Weight	Battery
	Type#	OS	Network	Display	CPU	RAM	front	rear	Video	Audio	Wi-Fi	Bluetooth	Internal	External	Height	Width	Thickness	Weight	Battery
Galaxy Tab	GT-P1000	Android 2.2; Froyo	HSUPA 5.76 Mbit/s 900/1700/1900/2100; EDGE/GPRS 850/900/1800/1900	1024x600 Super TFT	1.0 GHz single-core Exynos 3110 (Cortex A8)	512 MB	Yes; 1.3MPx	Yes; 3.2MPx	Playback: 720p Full HD videos @30 fps Recording: 720p videos @30fps	3.5 mm ear jack, stereo speaker	Yes 802.11 b/g/n	Yes v3.0 + A2DP	16/32 GB	Yes microSD	190.09 mm (7.484 in)	120.45 mm (4.742 in)	11.98 mm (0.472 in)	380 g (0.84 lb)	4000 mAh
Galaxy Tab 7.7	GT-P6800	Android 4.1; Jelly Bean	HSPA+ 21 Mbit/s 850/900/1900/2100; EDGE/GPRS 850/900/1800/1900	1280x800 Super AMOLED Plus	1.4 GHz dual-core Exynos 4210 (Cortex A9)	1 GB LPDDR2	Yes; 2 MPx	Yes; 3 MPx	Playback: 1080p full HD video @30fps; Recording: 720p HD video @24fps	3.5 mm ear jack, stereo speaker	Yes dual antenna 802.11 a/b/g/n	Yes; 3.0 + A2DP	16/32/64 GB	Yes microSD	196.7 mm (7.74 in)	133.0 mm (5.24 in)	7.9 mm (0.31 in)	340 g (0.75 lb)	5100 mAh
Galaxy Tab 7.0 Plus	GT-P6200	Android 4.1; Jelly Bean	HSPA+ 21 Mbit/s 850/900/1900/2100; EDGE/GPRS 850/900/1800/1900	1024x600 PLS	1.2 GHz dual-core Exynos 4210 (Cortex A9)	1 GB DDR2	Yes; 2 MPx	Yes; 3 MPx	Playback: 1080p full HD video @30fps; Recording: 720p video @24fps	3.5 mm ear jack, stereo speaker	Yes dual antenna 802.11 a/b/g/n	Yes; 3.0 + A2DP	16/32 GB	Yes microSD	193.7 mm (7.63 in)	122.4 mm (4.82 in)	9.9 mm (0.39 in)	345 g (0.761 lb)	4000 mAh
Galaxy Tab 2	GT-P3100	Android 4.0; Ice Cream Sandwich	HSPA+ 21 Mbit/s 850/900/1900/2100; EDGE/GPRS 850/900/1800/1900	1024x600 PLS	1.0 GHz dual-core TI OMAP4430 (Cortex A9)	1 GB DDR2	Yes; 0.3 MPx	Yes; 3 MPx	Playback: 1080p full HD video @30fps; Recording: 1080p full HD video @30fps	3.5 mm ear jack, stereo speaker	Yes; 802.11 b/g/n	Yes; 3.0 + A2DP	16/32 GB	Yes microSD	193.7 mm (7.63 in)	122.4 mm (4.82 in)	10.5 mm (0.41 in)	344 g (0.758 lb)	4000 mAh
Galaxy Tab 3	SM-T211	Android 4.1.2; Jelly Bean	HSPA+ 21 Mbit/s 850/900/1900/2100; EDGE/GPRS 850/900/1800/1900	1024x600 TFT	PXA986 1.2 GHz dual-core	1 GB	Yes; 1.3 MP	Yes; 3.15 MP AF with LED flash	Playback: 1080p full HD video @30fps; Recording: 1080p full HD video @30fps	3.5 mm ear jack, stereo speaker	Yes; 802.11 a/b/g/n	Yes; 3.0 + A2DP	16/32 GB	Yes microSD	188 mm (7.4 in)	111.1 mm (4.37 in)	9.9 mm (0.39 in)	302 g (0.666 lb)	4000 mAh

== Banned in Europe ==
A sales ban on the Samsung Galaxy Tab 7.7 in Germany was extended to the entire European Union by a German court in June 2012.

The 7.7-inch slate is the latest casualty in the ongoing patent wrangle between Apple and Samsung. The tablet is no stranger to this dispute—it was officially unveiled at IFA in Berlin 2012, but was almost immediately yanked from the show floor after a sales injunction. Samsung has issued a statement saying that it was "disappointed with the court's ruling" and that it "will continue...to protect our intellectual property rights and defend against Apple's claims to ensure our products remain available to consumers throughout the European Union".

== See also ==
- Comparison of tablet computers
- Acer Iconia A100
- Toshiba Thrive 7
- ViewSonic ViewPad 7x
