= Samsung Galaxy Note (1st generation) =

Android smartphone by Samsung

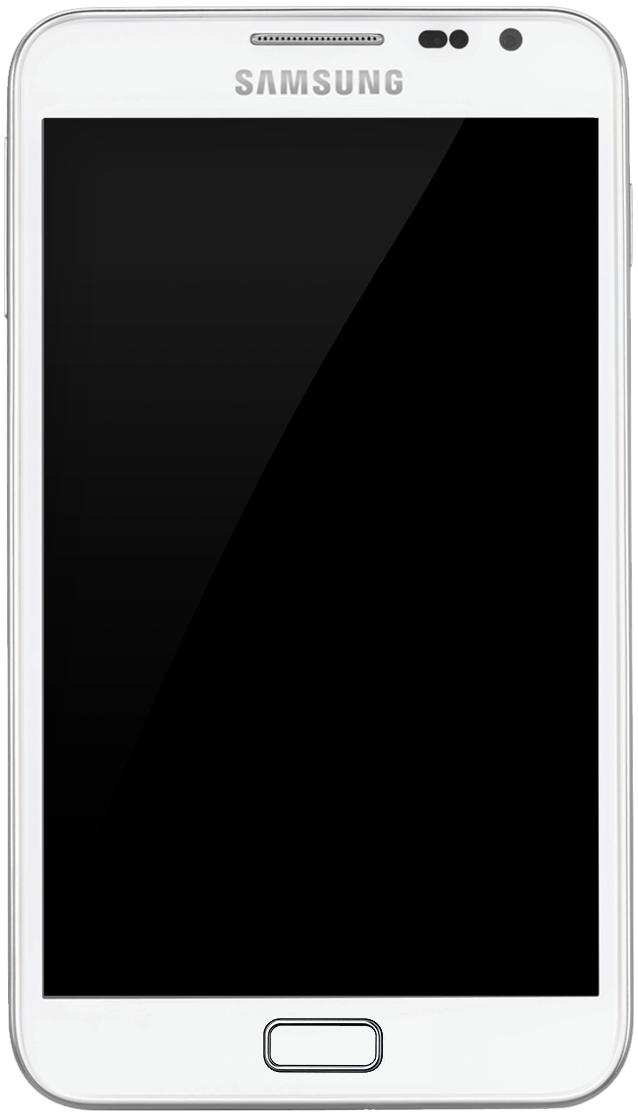
- Samsung Galaxy Note in White
- Manufacturer: Samsung Electronics
- Type: Phablet
- Series: Galaxy Note
- First released: October 29, 2011; 15 years ago
- Units sold: 10 million (as of 15 August 2012)
- Successor: Samsung Galaxy Note II
- Related: Galaxy Nexus; Samsung Galaxy S II; Samsung Galaxy Tab 10.1; Samsung Galaxy Note 10.1
- Compatible networks: (GSM/GPRS/EDGE): 850, 900, 1800, and 1900 MHz; UMTS: 850, 900, 1900, and 2100 MHz; HSPA+: 21 Mbit/s; HSUPA: 5.76 Mbit/s; LTE; TD-SCDMA (China Mobile) & EV-DO Rev.A (China Telecom) 3G
- Dimensions: 146.85 mm (5.781 in) H 82.95 mm (3.266 in) W 9.65 mm (0.380 in) D
- Weight: 178 g (6.3 oz)
- Operating system: Original: Android 2.3.5 "Gingerbread"; Last: Android 4.1.2 "Jelly Bean"; Unofficial: Android 16 QPR2 via LineageOS 23.2
- System-on-chip: Samsung Exynos 4210 (3G model); Qualcomm Snapdragon s3 APQ8060 (T-Mobile US & LTE models), MSM8660 (LG U+ models)
- CPU: 1.4 GHz dual-core ARM Cortex-A9; 1.5 GHz dual-core Qualcomm Scorpion APQ8060 (Qualcomm models)
- GPU: ARM Mali-400 MP (Samsung model); Qualcomm Adreno 220 (Qualcomm model)
- Memory: 1 GB LPDDR-400
- Storage: 16/32 GB flash memory
- Removable storage: microSD (up to 64 GB SDXC)
- Battery: 2500 mAh; Internal rechargeable Li-ion
- Rear camera: 8 Megapixel Back-illuminated sensor with auto focus, 1080p 30 fps Full HD video recording, LED flash
- Front camera: 2 Megapixel video recording (VGA), and stills
- Display: 5.3 in (134.62 mm) Super AMOLED with RGBG-matrix (PenTile); 800x1280 px WXGA (285 ppi)
- Connectivity: List: 3.5 mm TRRS; Wi-Fi (802.11a/b/g/n); Wi-Fi Direct; Bluetooth 3.0; Micro USB 2.0; Optional Near field communication (NFC); USB Host (OTG) 2.0
- Data inputs: List: Multi-touch touch screen; 1 push button and 2 touch buttons; Headset controls; Proximity and ambient light sensors; 3-axis gyroscope; Magnetometer; Accelerometer; Barometer; aGPS; Stereo FM radio; S Pen (Stylus)/Pen UX
- SAR: Intl. model: Head: 0.3 W/kg 1 g Body: 0.5 W/kg 1 g Hotspot: 0.58 W/kg 1 g; US model: Head: 0.16 W/kg Body: 0.96 W/kg
- Other: List: Wi-Fi hotspot, AllShare, Exchange ActiveSync; Online services Google Play, GALAXY Apps (Social Hub, Readers Hub and Game Hub)

The Samsung Galaxy Note (retrospectively referred to unofficially as the Galaxy Note 1, first Galaxy Note, or original Galaxy Note) is an Android-based smartphone produced by Samsung Electronics. It was unveiled at IFA Berlin 2011 and first released in Germany in late October 2011, with other countries following afterwards. The Galaxy Note was distinguished by its unusually large form factor—later referred to using the term "phablet"—which straddled the size of the average smartphone at the time, and that of a small tablet: it features a 5.3-inch display, and is the first to be bundled with a stylus branded as the "S Pen", which can be used to navigate the device's user interface, and write or draw in supported apps, and the first in what would become the former Galaxy Note series. It was succeeded by the Samsung Galaxy Note II in 2012.

== Specifications ==
=== Hardware ===
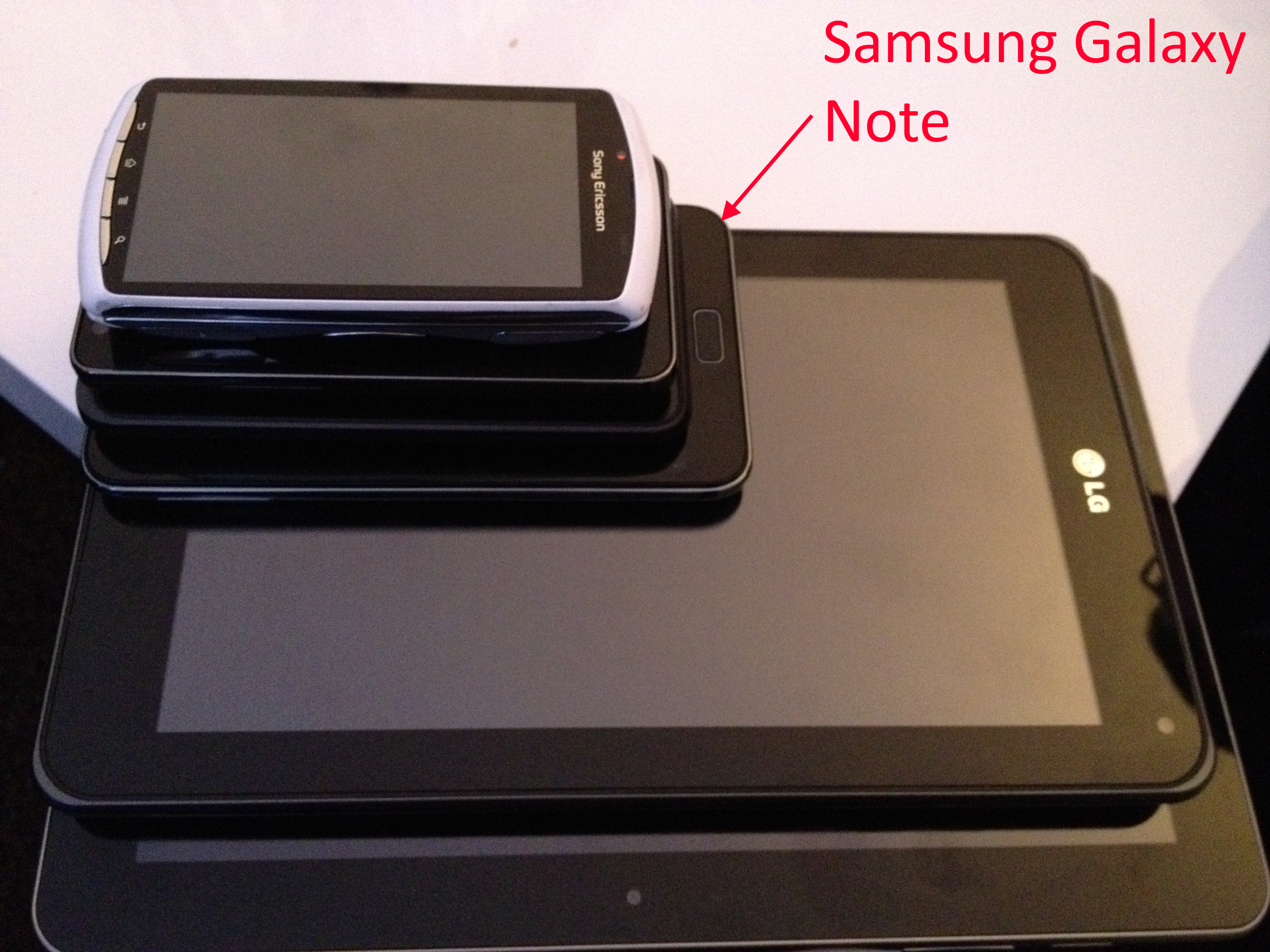
Size comparison of various smartphones and tablets. Order from top to bottom: Sony Ericsson Xperia Play, Samsung Galaxy S II, HTC Titan, the Samsung Galaxy Note itself, LG Optimus Pad, and Samsung Galaxy Tab 10.1.

The Galaxy Note's hardware design is similar to the Samsung Galaxy S II, with a plastic-based construction, a hardware home button and capacitive menu and back keys. It was made available in "Carbon Blue", "Ceramic White", and pink colour finishes. The device is 9.7 mm thick with a weight of 178 g. Power and volume keys are located on the horizontal sides of the device, the headphone jack is located on the top, and a compartment for the stylus is located on the bottom corner. The rear cover can be exposed to access the battery compartment, as well as SIM and microSD card slots. The device includes a removable 2500 mAh Li-On battery.

The Galaxy Note features a 5.3-inch HD Super AMOLED Wide XGA display, with a display resolution of 800 x 1280 (285 pixels per inch), as well as Mobile High-Definition Link (MHL). It is sized between smartphones such as the Galaxy S II and the Galaxy Tab 7.0 tablet; this form factor was nicknamed a "phablet" by the press. The Galaxy Note uses a dual-core Exynos system-on-chip, with two ARM Cortex-A9 CPU cores clocked at 1.4 GHz, a Mali-400 MP graphics core, and 1 GB of RAM. It includes either 16 or 32 GB of internal storage expandable via a microSD card. The Galaxy Note includes an 8-megapixel rear-facing camera, and a 2-megapixel front-facing camera.

The Galaxy Note includes a stylus branded as the S Pen, which is stored in a compartment on the lower panel of the phone. The Galaxy Note's display includes an active digitizer by Wacom, with 128 levels of pressure sensitivity. The pen can replace the use of a finger in situations where precision is needed, but the device is also bundled with apps designed for use with the stylus. A button on the side of the pen can be used to activate special pen-oriented features and gestures in the system software.

=== Software ===
The Galaxy Note originally shipped with Android 2.3.5 "Gingerbread" and Samsung's proprietary TouchWiz software suite. The home screen was tweaked to take advantage of the larger screen size, using a five-column grid for app shortcuts and widgets rather than four. The software includes features designed for use with the stylus, including handwriting input, and "Quick Memo" (accessed by double-tapping the screen when holding the stylus button down), which opens a virtual sticky note in a window on top of the current app. Quick Memo notes are saved in the S Memo app, which allows users to type, write, or draw notes and drawings, attach voice messages, and annotate screenshots. The device is also bundled with Polaris Office, and the game Crayon Physics Deluxe—which can leverage the pressure sensitivity of the stylus.

In May 2012, Samsung began to distribute an update to Android 4.0.4 "Ice Cream Sandwich" (which itself added system-level support for pen input) to the Galaxy Note. It upgrades the TouchWiz software to match the version introduced by the Galaxy S III.

In October 2012, Samsung began to distribute Android 4.1 "Jelly Bean" for the Galaxy Note in South Korea and some other parts of the world.

The Android 4.1 "Jelly Bean" update (Android 4.1.2) became the last shipping official OTA update for the Galaxy Note, retrofitting functionality such as pop-up play, the ability to play video in a movable and resizeable floating picture-in-picture pop-up window.

Some unofficial Android OS (Custom ROM) development for the Galaxy Note such as the third-party fork LineageOS is available on XDA Forums. On August 2, 2026, a developer on XDA Forums successfully ported LineageOS 23.2 to the GT-N7000, making the Note the oldest device that can run Android 16.

== Variants ==
A Galaxy Note with some of the standard accessories

Several different model variants of the Galaxy Note were sold, with most variants differing only in support for regional network types and bands. In some regions, the Exynos system-on-chip was substituted for a Qualcomm Snapdragon S3 model, while an LTE-capable model was sold in North America that also contains noticeable design changes. (Some Galaxy Note phones in the North American region used capactive buttons only for the home, menu and return key. There was also a capacitive button for the Search key.)

Model	Country	Carrier	Network	AP	Other
GT-N7000	International		WCDMA + GSM	Exynos 4210	FM radio
GT-N7000B	Australia; Thailand		UMTS 850/2100 + GSM	Exynos 4210	FM radio
GT-N7005	Hong Kong; Singapore		LTE + WCDMA + GSM	Snapdragon S3 APQ8060	4-button
SHV-E160K	South Korea	KT	LTE + WCDMA + GSM	Snapdragon S3 APQ8060	T-DMB, 2 batteries, battery charger
SHV-E160S	South Korea	SK Telecom	LTE + WCDMA + GSM	Snapdragon S3 APQ8060	T-DMB, 2 batteries, battery charger
SHV-E160L	South Korea	LG U+	LTE + WCDMA + GSM + CDMA2000 EV-DO Rev.A	Snapdragon S3 MSM8660	T-DMB, 2 batteries, battery charger
SC-05D; SGH-N054	Japan	NTT DoCoMo	LTE + WCDMA + GSM	Snapdragon S3 APQ8060	1-Seg TV, NTT DoCoMo Palette UI
SGH-i717	United States	AT&T	LTE + WCDMA + GSM	Snapdragon S3 APQ8060	No Headphone, 4-button
SGH-i717i	Canada		LTE + WCDMA + GSM	Snapdragon S3 APQ8060	4-button
SGH-T879	United States	T-Mobile US	WCDMA + GSM	Snapdragon S3 APQ8060	4-button
GT-i9220	China	China Unicom	WCDMA + GSM	Exynos 4210	No Google Service, FM radio
GT-i9228	China	China Mobile	TD-SCDMA + GSM	Exynos 4210	No Google Service, FM radio
SCH-I889	China	China Telecom	CDMA2000 EV-DO Rev.A + GSM	Exynos 4210	No Google Service, dual-SIM, R-UIM SLOT (CDMA2000 SIM-card), FM radio

Samsung have made available a collection of accessories such as a clip-on screen cover (which replaces the back panel), a docking station, and spare chargers and styluses.

=== SGH-I717 ===
Another variant of the Galaxy Note capable of LTE connectivity was released exclusively in the United States and Canada. The variant was first released on AT&T on 19 February 2012 in the US, while being simultaneously released on Telus, Bell, and Rogers on 14 February 2012 in Canada. Although commonly referred to as the Galaxy Note LTE, the official model number is SGH-I717, differentiating it from the original N7000 and the Korea-exclusive LTE variant. In addition to LTE connectivity, Samsung made several modifications to the phone. Externally, the physical "home" button and the two touch-sensitive buttons on the front of the phone were replaced by four touch-sensitive buttons. Internally, the chipset was changed to the Qualcomm MSM8660 Snapdragon, which is significantly slower than the original Exynos 4 Dual 45 nm (4210) chipset. The Snapdragon 3 SoC features a dual-core 1.5 GHz Scorpion CPU and an Adreno 220 GPU. FM radio was removed. All other phone specifications remained identical to the original N7000.

== Reception ==
The Galaxy Note received positive reviews, but with critics divided on user acceptance of its polarizing form factor. Pocket-lint remarked that the device was "positively gargantuan" in comparison to an iPhone 4S and that users would look "like a tool" if they held it to their face to take a call. At the same time, the HD Super AMOLED display was considered one of the best that Samsung had ever used in a device—praising its increased resolution and clarity over that of the Galaxy S II, its "vibrant and searing" colors, and its convenience for watching video whilst travelling. The presence of a stylus was compared to PDAs and early Windows Mobile devices, but with the addition of pressure sensitivity and the "versatile" S Memo app. However, beyond bundled apps and others in the S Choice portal, the device was criticized for not having enough software designed around the S Pen on launch. In conclusion, the Galaxy Note was considered to be a capable device and potentially "the best handheld games console around" due to its screen size, but showed concerns over whether it would appeal to a mainstream audience. However, it was argued that the Galaxy Note could appeal best to enterprise users, as it can "[replace] a tablet with gusto. As useful as a larger device, yet more portable."

GSMArena felt that the Galaxy Note "may be out of many people's comfort zone", but praised the device's high-end performance and large screen, and felt that the stylus and TouchWiz UI were added "value" to the device. In regard to its market positioning, it was felt that web browsing felt more comfortable on the Galaxy Note's 5.3-inch screen than watching video (in comparison to a 10.1-inch screen), explaining that "not necessarily the perfect choice for any situation, the Note will have you covered for most of the applications of modern day smart devices." The Galaxy Note was considered to be a niche device distinct from other recent attempts at large phones (such as the Dell Streak and HTC Sensation XL), concluding that "we don't think all phones will look like the Galaxy Note any time soon. Samsung are just pushing a little bit further than the rest. Stretching the comfort zone. The Galaxy Note is not what you're used to. You can take it as a warning. Or an invitation."

In a follow-up review in October 2012 after the release of the Galaxy Note II and the update to Android 4.1, TechRadar praised the quality of the Galaxy Note's display and Samsung's "intuitive" system software. The camera was praised for its quality and number of options available, but it was noted that the large form factor made it trickier to use the camera one-handed. The lack of a dedicated shutter button was also criticized, as well as the extrusion of the camera lens itself, which made it susceptible to scratching. The S Pen was considered "handy", but was criticized for having inconsistent performance, while the design of the stylus itself was criticized for feeling "like writing with a twiglet for people like us with shovel-like hands." TechRadar concluded that there "aren't many things we can complain about with the Galaxy Note", but showed concerns that the size of the device may alienate users who are not used to the concept of a large phone: it was argued that the device would appeal best to users more interested in web browsing and multimedia consumption as opposed to those who primarily want to use their phone as a communications device. Noting that the device's marketability was questioned on launch, it was felt that the success of the Galaxy Note II proved there was a legitimate consumer interest in the concept of a phablet.

=== Sales ===
In December 2011, Samsung announced that one million Galaxy Notes were shipped in less than two months, and that a North American variant would be available in February 2012. In January 2012, the US model of the Galaxy Note was featured at the 2012 CES in Las Vegas, allowing press to get an early look at the new device.

As of the first quarter of 2012 from January to March, 5 million had been sold. As of 1 June 2012, Samsung announced that 7 million had been shipped. As of 15 August 2012, Samsung announced that 10 million devices had been sold.

== Camera: test photos from rear-facing ==
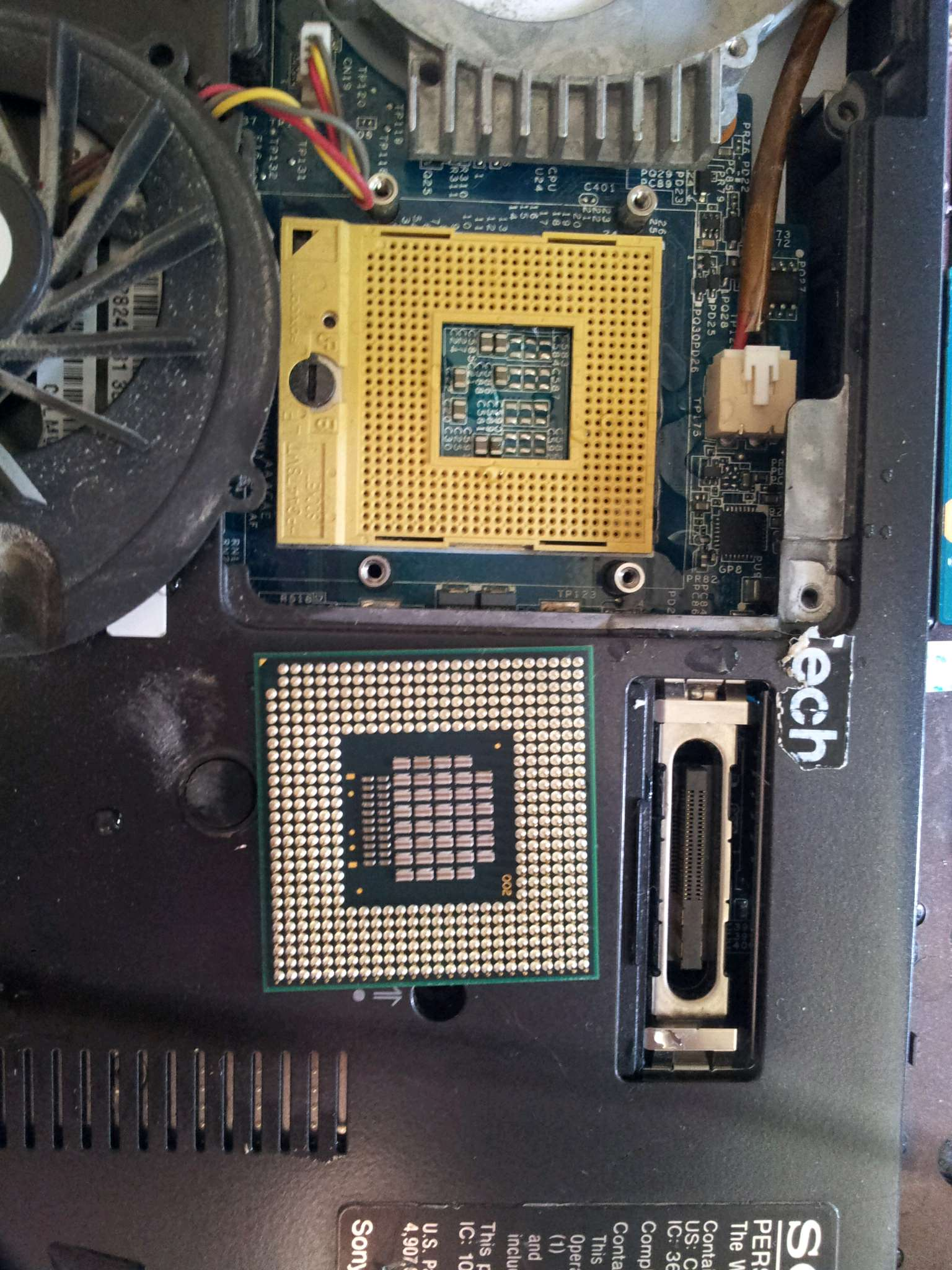

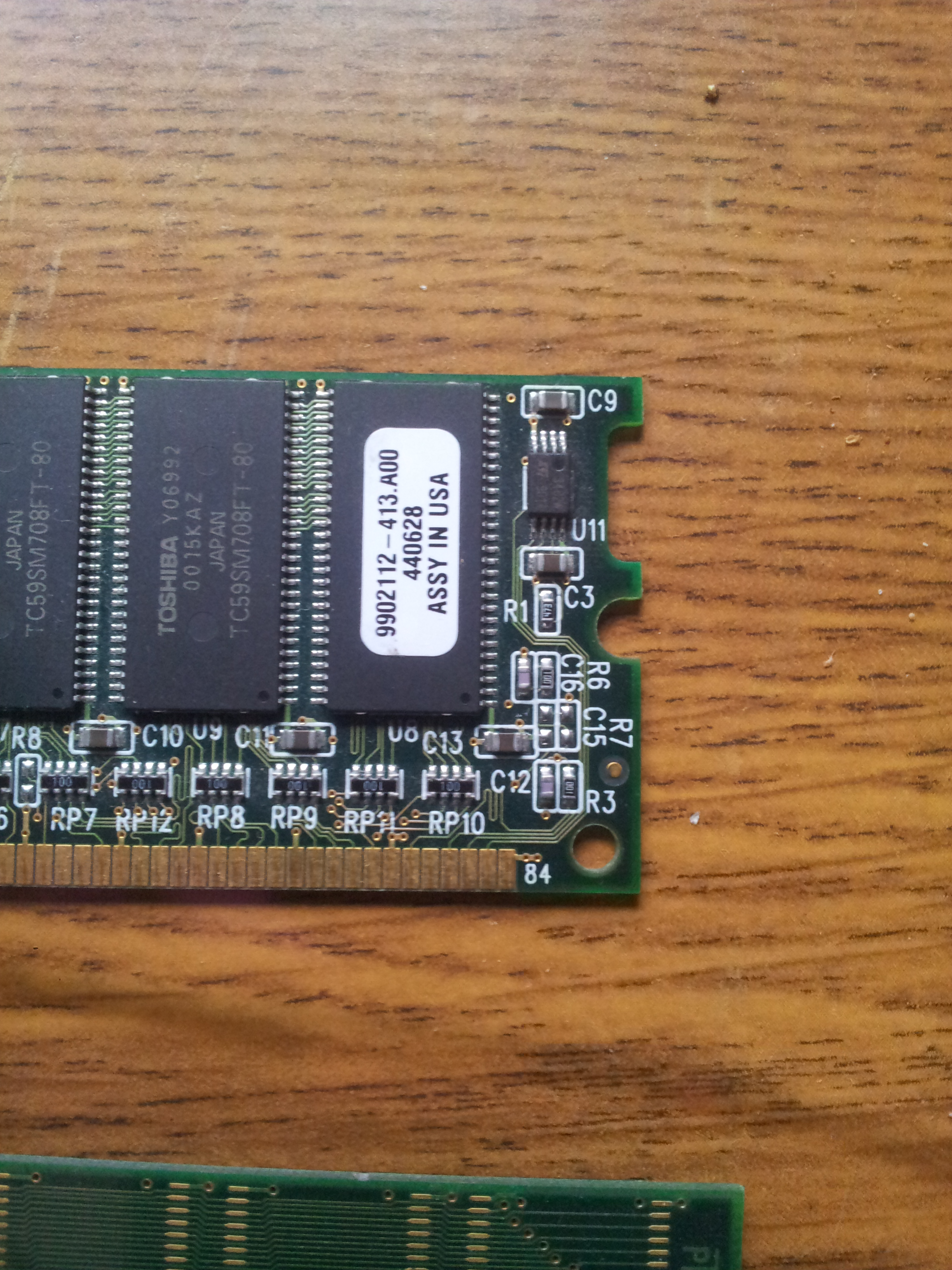

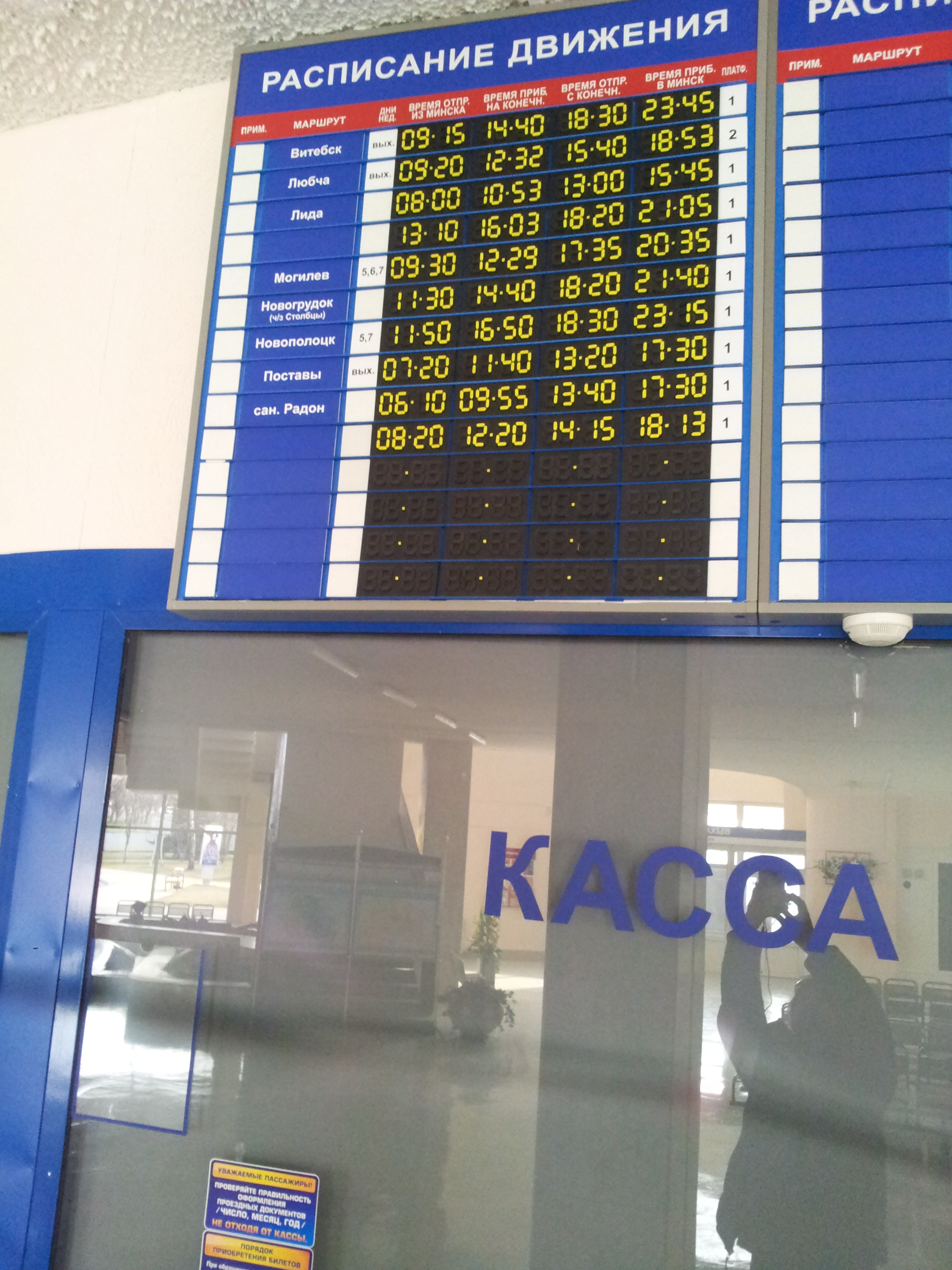

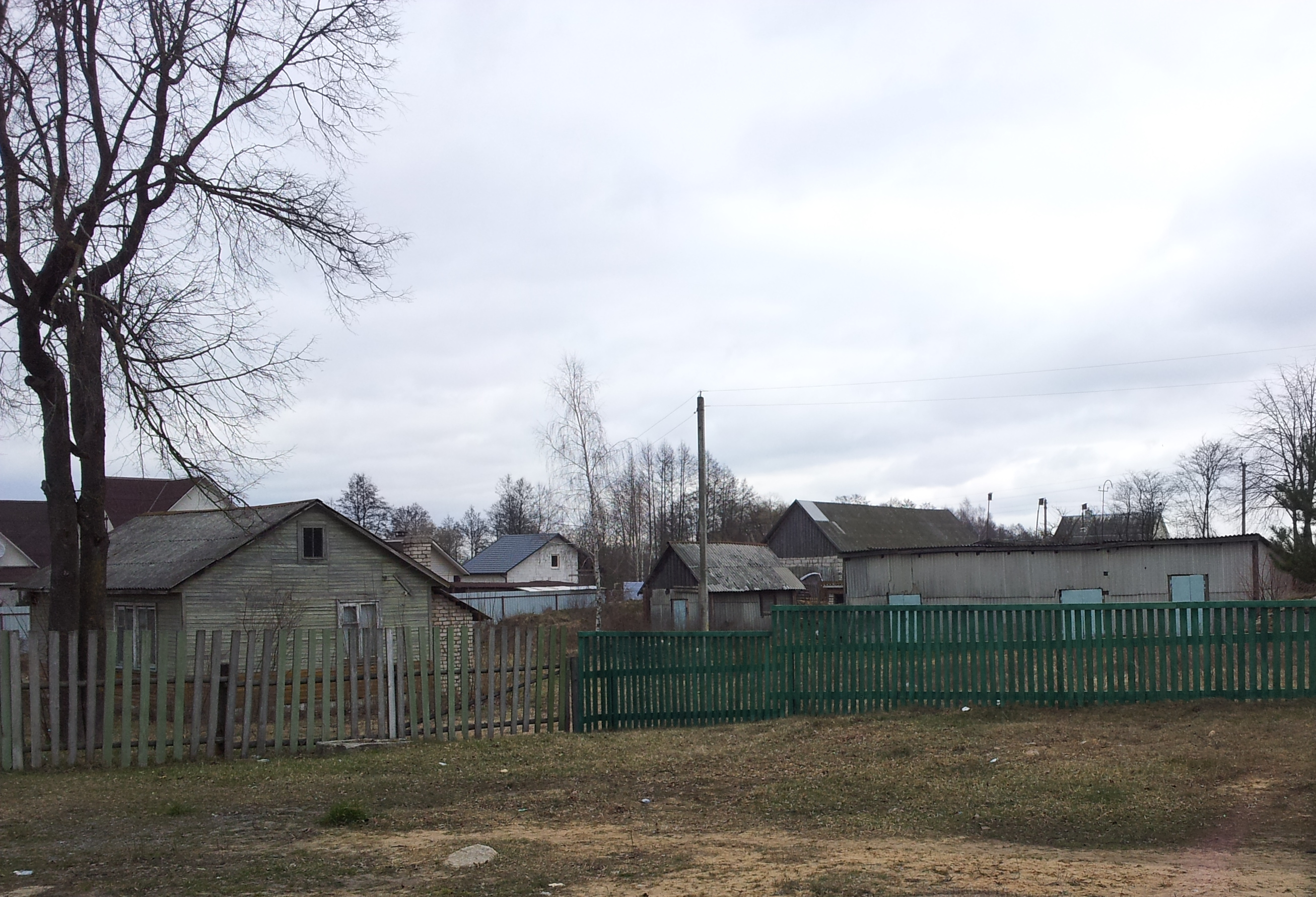

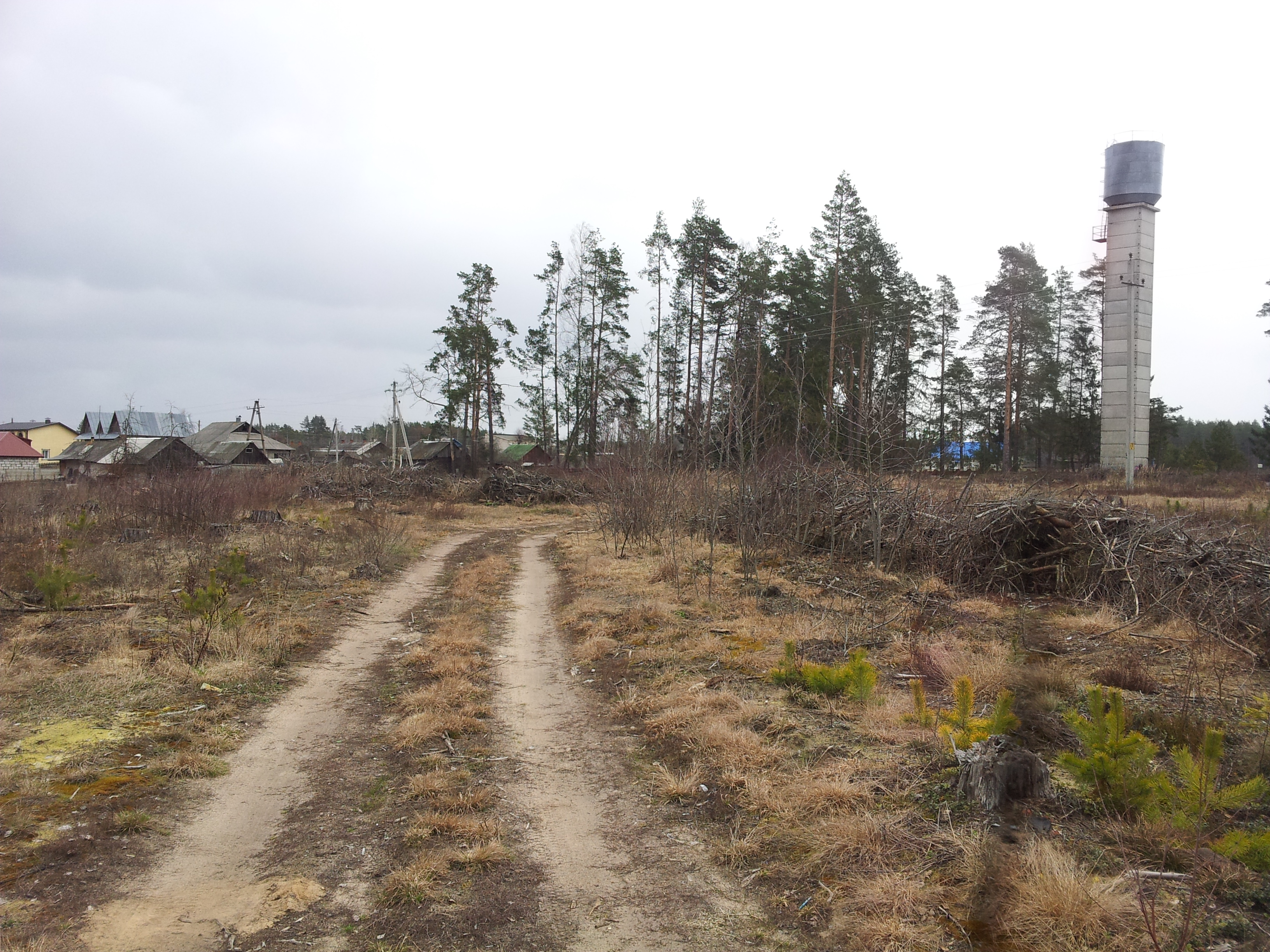

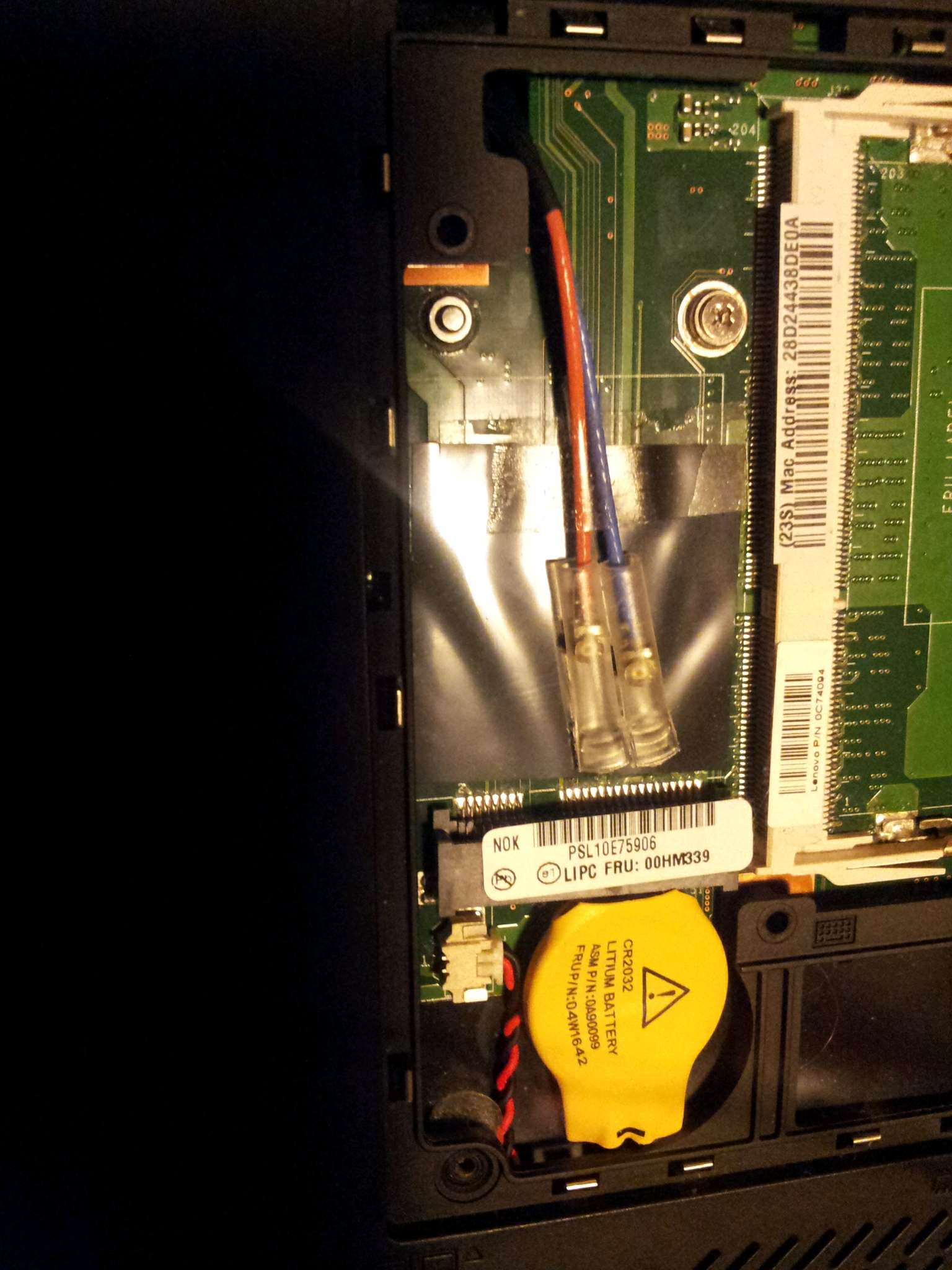

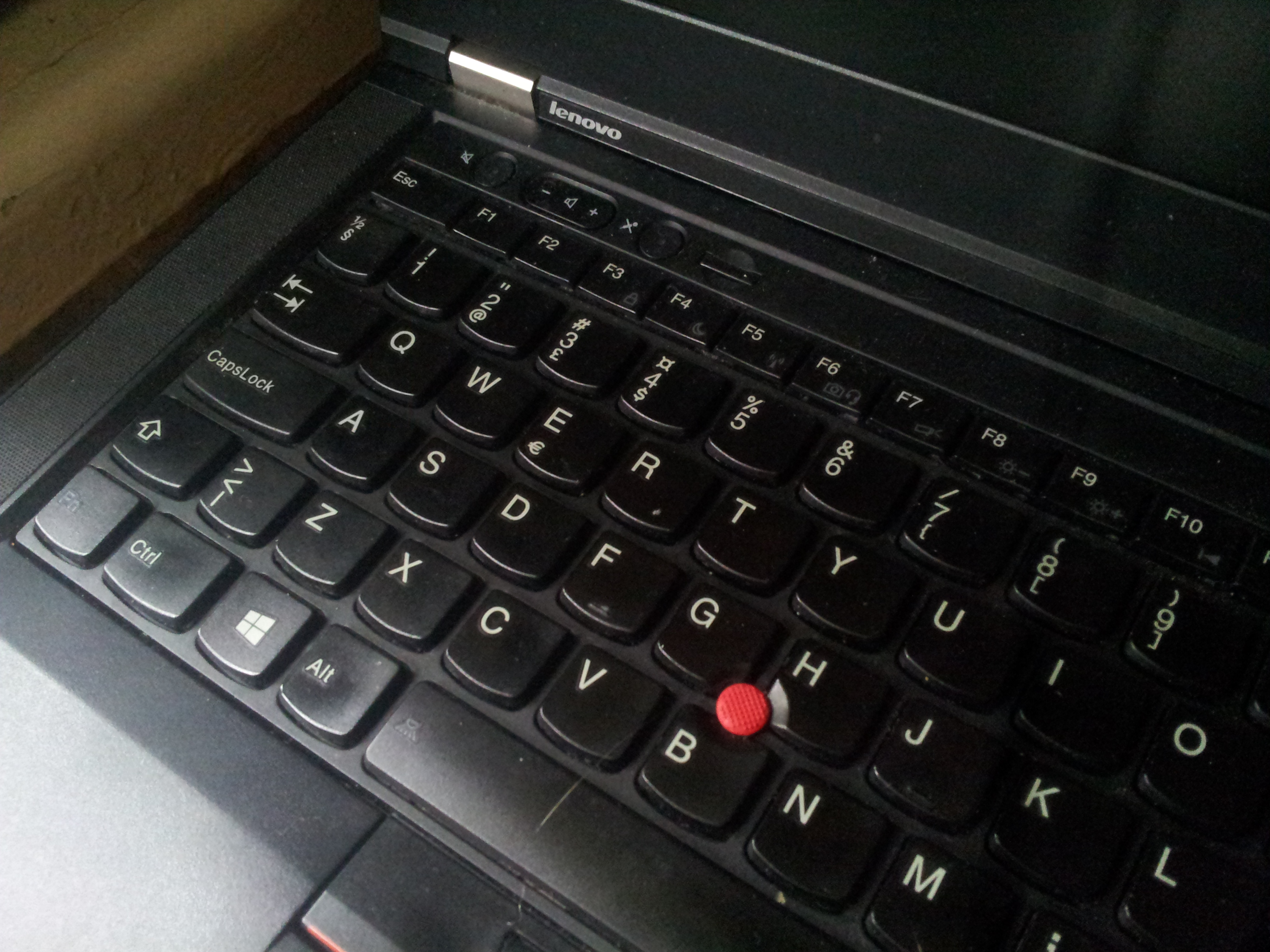

== See also ==
- Pen computing
- Tablet computer
- Mobile device

== Notes ==
Preceded by None	Samsung Galaxy Note; 2011	Succeeded by Samsung Galaxy Note II
