= Venue =

A venue is the location at which an event takes place. It may refer to:

== Locations ==
- Venue (law), the place a case is heard
- Financial trading venue, a place or system where financial transactions can occur
- Music venue, place used for a concert or musical performance
- Sport venue, place used for a sporting event
- Theater (structure), or venue, a place used for performing theater

== Other uses ==
- Venue (magazine), the "what's on" magazine for the Bristol and Bath areas of the UK
- Venue (sound system), a brand of live sound mixing consoles
- Dell Venue, an Android smartphone manufactured by Dell
- Hyundai Venue, a car model manufactured by Hyundai Motor Company

== See also ==
- The Venue (disambiguation)
