= Samsung Galaxy Tab 7.0 =

Android tablet by Samsung

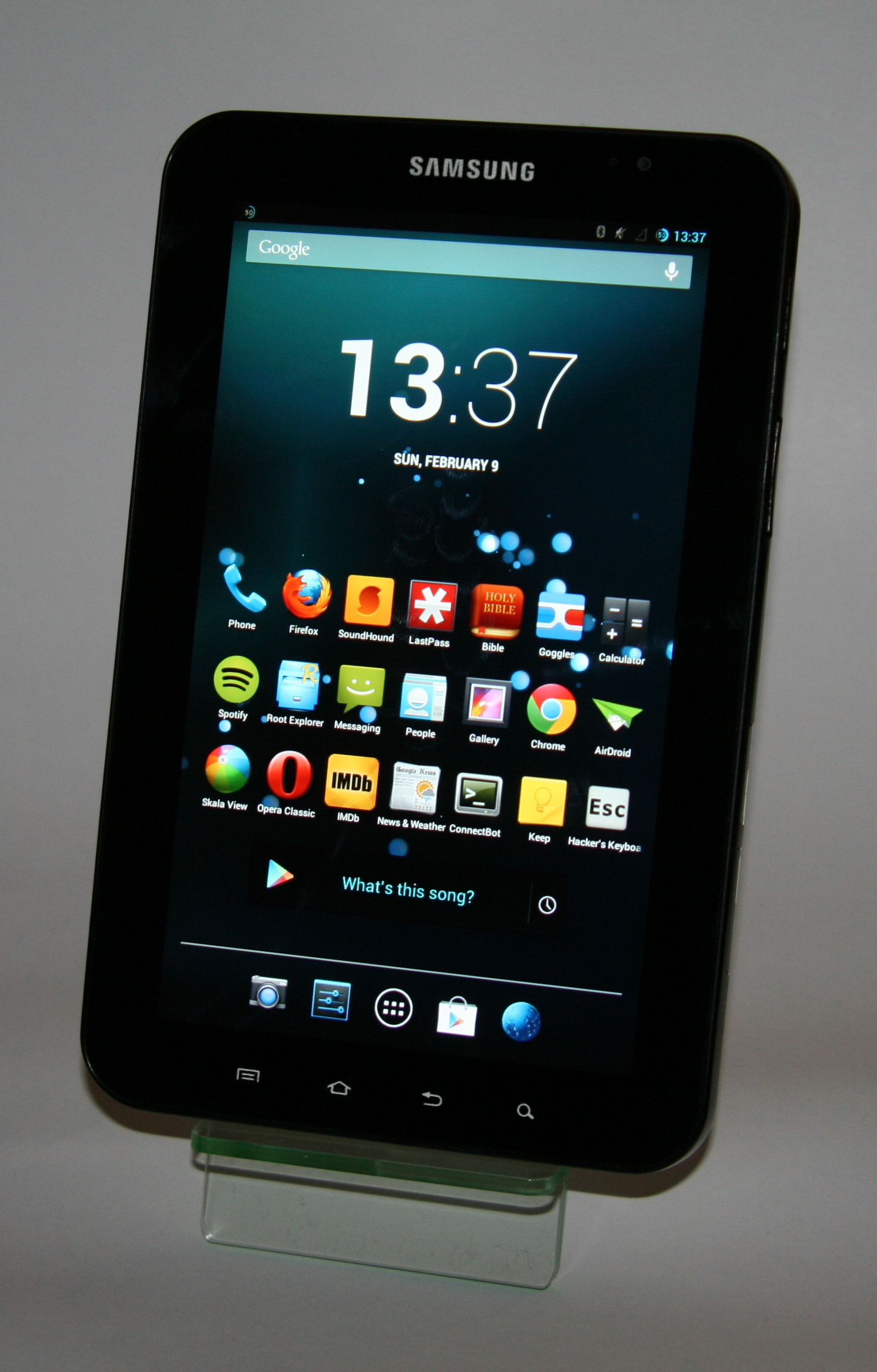
- Samsung Galaxy Tab 7.0 running CyanogenMod 10.1 (Android 4.2.2)
- Developer: Samsung
- Manufacturer: Samsung Electronics
- Type: Tablet computer
- Released: 5 November 2010
- Operating system: Original: Android 2.2.1 "Froyo" with TouchWiz UI 3.0/4.0; Current: Android 2.3.6 "Gingerbread" with TouchWiz UI 3.0/4.0; Unofficial: Android 6.0 "Marshmallow" with CyanogenMod 13.0
- CPU: Samsung Exynos 3110 (code-named "Hummingbird") ARM Cortex A8; 1.0 GHz
- Memory: 512 MB or 444 MB
- Storage: Flash memory 2 GB (CDMA), 16 GB or 32 GB models and microSD slot
- Display: 1024×600 px (aspect ratio 16:10), 7.0 in (180 mm) diagonal, appr. 21 sq in (138 cm^{2}) at 170 PPI or 200 PPI
- Input: Multi-touch screen
- Camera: 3.2 MP AF camera with LED flash 1.3 MP front-facing (for video calls)
- Connectivity: (GSM / GPRS / EDGE): 850 / 900 / 1800 / 1900 MHz (HSUPA 5.76 Mbit/s, HSDPA 7.2 Mbit/s): 900 / 1900 / 2100 MHz, or 1700 / 1900 MHz; CDMA 800 / 1900 MHz EVDO Rev A Wi-Fi 802.11b/g/n, Bluetooth 3.0, DLNA Connection Port
- Power: 4000 mAh battery
- Dimensions: 190.09 mm (7.484 in) (H); 120.45 mm (4.742 in) (W); 11.98 mm (0.472 in) (D)
- Weight: 380 g (13 oz)
- Related: Samsung Galaxy S Samsung Galaxy Tab 10.1; Samsung Galaxy Tab 8.9; Samsung Galaxy Tab 7.7
- Website: Samsung GALAXY Tab

The Samsung Galaxy Tab 7.0 or simply Samsung Galaxy Tab is an Android-based mini-tablet computer produced by Samsung and released on 5 November 2010. The tablet was first introduced on 2 September 2010 at the IFA in Berlin. The Galaxy Tab was the first Samsung Android-powered tablet to be released.

The Galaxy Tab has a 7-inch (180 mm) TFT-LCD touchscreen, Wi-Fi capability, a 1.0 GHz ARM Cortex-A8 Samsung Exynos 3110 processor (code-named "Hummingbird"), the Swype input system, a 3.2 MP rear-facing camera and a 1.3 MP front-facing camera for video calls. It runs the Android 2.2 (Froyo) operating system, (upgradable to 2.3) and supports telephone functionality as a speaker phone, via provided wired ear piece or Bluetooth earpieces (except models sold in the US). It can download videoconferencing apps such as Tango or Skype as alternative to telephone functionality.

== Hardware ==
The tablet is enclosed in a plastic frame that makes it lighter than other metal-bodied tablets, weighing 380 g (0.84 lb).

The GT-P1000 model carries a 7" Super TFT instead of the AMOLED which is used by Samsung in its Galaxy S phones. The screen has a 1024×600 resolution With mDNIE (Mobile Digital Natural Images Engine). Internal flash storage of 2 GB (North America CDMA models), 16 GB or 32 GB can be supplemented with a microSD flash card with up to 32 GB. The Exynos 3110 (also known as Hummingbird) SoC design features a 1.0 GHz ARM architecture Cortex A8 CPU and has 512, 444, or 640 MB of RAM paired with a PowerVR SGX540 graphics processor.

The Wi-Fi-only model GT-P1010 has a different OMAP 3630 based SoC design. It incorporates also a 1.0 GHz Cortex A8 CPU but the graphics chip is a PowerVR SGX530 graphics processor which is only half as powerful as the SGX540 of the GT-P1000. Also, the GT-P1010 tab does not support TV out. Samsung has provided an update to Android 3.0 Honeycomb android version only for selected regions like the UK.

The tablet has two cameras: a 3.2 rear MP camera with a LED flash and a 1.3 MP front camera for video calling (the Verizon model has a 3-megapixel rear camera). The front camera has auto focus capability. The camera also has auto image stitching, combining 8 pictures. Modes include single shot, continuous, panorama, and self-shot. It can automatically trigger on detecting that the subject smiles. Autogeotagging uses the internal GPS receiver.

The tablet has GPS, 802.11n Wi-Fi, Bluetooth 3.0, and handsfree/bluetooth/headphone telephone. Cellular protocols include GSM CDMA, HSPA (HSUPA).

The proprietary 30-pin docking and charging connector is not shared with other manufacturers. This connector appears very similar to the standard PDMI connector (a non-proprietary alternative to Apple's docking connector) and is sometimes mistaken for it, but it is non-standard and all accessories, including charging cables, are incompatible with other equipment and only available from Samsung.

Samsung says that its 4000 mAh battery will give it 7 hours of video playback or 10 hours of talk time.

The GSM variants of the Galaxy Tab have an externally accessible SIM card slot. If the SIM card is removed while the system is on, the system automatically reboots. The AT&T and T-Mobile variants of the Galaxy Tab ship with a micro SIM in a micro SIM adapter. For non-US Galaxy Tabs, with phone function, this slot can also accommodate a 3G data-only SIM card if the user does not need telephone functionality.

The Samsung Galaxy Tab also has an optional RCA plug connector through which the screen image is shown on a TV or other display (the Tab's own screen cannot be turned off; it can be dimmed with a backlight dimming app).

== Software ==
This tablet comes with a modified version of Android Froyo (upgradable to 2.3) with Samsung’s TouchWiz skin. Most Android apps (compatible with 2.2-3.0) developed using Google's design guidelines should scale properly when displayed on larger-screen devices such as the Samsung Galaxy Tab, according to Samsung. Adobe Flash 10.1, DivX, MPEG-4, WMV and Xvid, H.263, H.264 support has also been announced. The Tab uses Atmel's maXTouch multi touch capacitive touchscreen, and supports multi-tasking.

The Tab supports calendar, email and instant messaging applications. It has a launcher for e-reading applications which starts PressDisplay when reading newspapers, Kobo when reading e-books, and Zinio when reading magazines. For viewing and editing Microsoft Office documents, the Galaxy Tab also comes bundled with the Android version of ThinkFree Office Mobile.

The Tab can also provide tethering, acting as a Wi-Fi hotspot for up to 5 devices. Stored addresses can be displayed in Google Maps with one click. It also allows linkage with a contact's Facebook profile if the phone address is linked with the contact's Facebook address.

Several HD video content multimedia formats, including DivX, XviD, MPEG4, H.263, H.264, are supported. It can play video content either stored on the device itself or streamed from YouTube, and can output 720p video to a TV either as composite video or via HDMI when using the optional dock.

Text can be entered using Swype, by tracing a path over letters on a virtual keyboard, and standard XT9 predictive typing is also supported.

TouchWiz Samsung Galaxy Tabs allow the screen display to be saved. Honeycomb tablets without TouchWiz, including the 10.1 in Galaxy Tab, must either be rooted or have the SDK installed in order to capture screenshots.

Hundreds of thousands of mobile apps, the majority being free, are available from Google Play.

The Tab also come with Allshare software that allow sharing of multimedia files for presentations in conference rooms or for in an education setting for classroom lectures or assignments, or even act as remote control (for Samsung product only)., The Tab can also be combined with a Wi-Fi All-Share Cast Hub to allows for quick and easy pairing with non-Samsung USB enable hardware and you can control content and perform actions from your phone.

=== Upgrades ===
In May 2011, it was reported that Android Honeycomb 3.0 was being made available in Italy, and that it would be made available in other countries.

In February 2012, Android version Honeycomb 3.2 was made available. The Tab officially supported Froyo and Honeycomb. It can be unofficially upgraded to CyanogenMod 13 (Android 6.0)

== Early impressions and reviews ==
Some published early impressions were favourable, and the Tab was considered a serious rival to the iPad. "Rough edges" which should improve with later software updates were commented on.

== Release ==
=== Africa ===
- South Africa started selling the Tablet from 2 November 2010.
- Nigeria on 5 November 2010, Etisalat Nigeria became the first cellular network in Africa to launch the Galaxy Tab.
- Angola on 1 December 2010, Movicel used the Samsung Galaxy Tab 7" as the launch Tablet for its December launched GSM 900 MHz Network conversion from a CDMA 800 MHz.
- Ghana on 6 December 2010, Vodafone Ghana launched the Galaxy Tab.
- Uganda in 2010, MTN Uganda launched the Galaxy Tab.

=== Asia ===
The Samsung Galaxy Tab was released in Indonesia and Thailand without contract. in Malaysia, it was under contract by Maxis. The Galaxy Tab was also released in the Philippines under contract by Smart and was also available without contract for the GSM.

==== South Korea ====
The Samsung Galaxy Tab was released in South Korea on 3 November 2010, delayed from the original release date of 14 October.

==== India ====
Samsung launched the Galaxy Tab in India on 10 November 2010.

==== Singapore ====
The Samsung Galaxy Tab was released in Singapore exclusively with Singtel on 13 November 2010.

==== Pakistan ====
The Samsung Galaxy Tab released on 22 December 2010. It was available without a contract from Mobilink as well as in the open market.

==== Japan ====
The Samsung Galaxy Tab was released in Japan on 26 November 2010 and was under contract with NTT Docomo.

==== Middle East ====
The Samsung Galaxy Tab was officially released in the Middle east in Dubai's GITEX Shopper the largest gathering of the region's leading ICT retailers and suppliers.

=== Australia ===
The Samsung Galaxy Tab was released on 8 November 2010. It was available without a contract from several major national retailers, and under contract from Vodafone, Telstra, Optus and other carriers.

=== Brazil ===
The Samsung Galaxy Tab was released in Brazil on 26 November 2010. Brazilian version seems to be faster; the processor is clocked at 1.2 GHz and it has support for analog VHF and UHF PAL-M and digital ISDB-T TV broadcasts.

=== Europe ===
The Samsung Galaxy Tab was released in Germany and Poland on 11 October 2010. The UK version of the Tab was released on 1 November 2010. In Spain and most other European countries it was released later in 2010.

=== United States ===
The Galaxy Tab was released in the US from T-Mobile, Sprint, AT&T, U.S. Cellular and Verizon.

T-Mobile started offering the SGH-T849 Galaxy Tab on 10 November 2010.

Verizon started offering the SCH-I800 Galaxy Tab on 11 November 2010. Verizon's version of the Galaxy Tab has a textured black back, as opposed to the standard plastic rear of the T-Mobile, Sprint, and AT&T versions. The Verizon and Sprint versions disable the Human Interface Device (HID) bluetooth features so it will not work with bluetooth keyboards, mice, etc. However, updates did correct this issue for both carriers.

Sprint started offering the Galaxy Tab on 14 November 2010.

AT&T began offering the Tab on 21 November 2010, with no contract requirement.

The FCC approved a Wi-Fi only version of the Galaxy Tab. Some Best Buy advertisements appear to have been prematurely leaked about the Wi-Fi only version of the Galaxy Tab.

Wi-Fi-only model was released on 11 April 2011.

== Sales ==
A week after its release, Samsung announced that they had sold 600,000 units. On 4 December, it was reported that the 1 million mark was reached, two months after launch. However, an executive at Lenovo claimed that Samsung had only sold 20,000 out of the 1 million Galaxy Tabs that were shipped. In January 2011 Samsung announced they had shipped 2 million units to stores. In August 2012, actual sales figures were released in the patent infringement court case against Apple showing that a total of 1.4M Galaxy Tabs were sold from launch to Q2 2012.

== Successor models ==
During the 2011 International Consumer Electronics Show (CES), Verizon Wireless and Samsung Telecommunications America (Samsung Mobile) announced that a new 4G LTE-Enabled Samsung Galaxy Tab features access to Verizon Wireless' 4G/LTE Mobile Broadband Network and a 5-megapixel rear-facing camera will be available.

At the Mobile World Congress event in 2011 Barcelona Samsung showed a new Galaxy Tab model with bigger 10.1 inch HD displays and faster processor, running Google's Android Honeycomb operating system. It was set for a US release in March 2011 and a European release in April. However, after the iPad 2 release, some specifications were described as "inadequate" by the executive vice president of Samsung's mobile division.

This would lead to the introduction of a newer, slimmer 10.1" model at the Samsung Unpacked Event during CTIA Wireless Convention in March 2011, together with an 8.9 inch model, pushing the release date further to 8 June for the US release and "early summer" for the latter model. Although there was no information about a delay of the European release date, it was announced that the previous design, seen at the Mobile World Congress, would be sold relabelled as "Samsung Galaxy Tab 10.1v".

During IFA 2011 in Berlin, Samsung announced the new Galaxy Tab 7.7, sporting a dual-core 1.4 GHz processor, 1 GB of memory, support for 32 GB MicroSD cards (possibly only on some models), a 5,100mAh battery, a front-facing 2-megapixel camera and a rear-facing 3-megapixel camera with flash. There will be 16 GB, 32 GB and 64 GB models available and each will support 802.11 a/b/g/n standards at both 2.4 GHz and 5 GHz. The unit measures 196.7 x 133 x 7.89 mm (7.75 x 5.24 x 0.31 inches) and weighs 335g (11.8 oz) making it much more single-hand friendly than larger models from Samsung and other manufacturers.

The original successor to the original Galaxy Tab is the Samsung Galaxy Tab 7.0 Plus. This model features the same 7" screen with the same resolution of 1,024 x 600, and uses a PLS panel. Also it now comes with Android 3.2 Honeycomb pre-installed as well as including newer, more powerful hardware. The new model includes a 1.2 GHz dual-core processor, 16 GB or 32 GB of user accessible flash storage, and a 2-megapixel front and 3-megapixel rear-facing camera. The device is much smaller than the original, measuring 193.5 x 122.4 x 9.9 mm and weighing just 345 grams. Although originally it was pitted to be the successor, the Galaxy Tab 7.0 plus was seen more as an update to the original Galaxy Tab 7.0.

The first true successor tablets in the series are the Galaxy Tab 2 7.0 and 10.1 and are aimed at budget markets. The front-facing cameras have been downgraded to VGA quality, the chip set is now a TI OMAP4430 1.0 GHz dual-core, and is slightly thicker. In addition, the 5 GHz WiFi has been dropped. The 10.1" version retails for $399 and the 7.0" version retails for $249.

On the other hand, Samsung released the first tablet under the Samsung Galaxy Note series which was the Galaxy Note 10.1 and was expanded further by the release of Samsung's first 8-inch tablet which was the Galaxy Note 8.0. The Galaxy Note series replaced the Galaxy tab series in the upper tier market which was once its tier. Also the Note 10.1 was seen as a higher-end alternative to the Galaxy tab 10.1, tab 2 10.1, and tab 3 10.1 as it has a 10.1-inch display and uses a quad-core 1.4 GHz processor and supports the Samsung S-Pen input as seen on the original Galaxy Note phone. While the Note 8.0 was seen as a higher-end alternative to the Galaxy tab 3 8.0 which also uses a quad-core 1.6 GHz processor and also supports the Samsung S-Pen found in the Note series.

The second and current true successor tablets in the series are the Galaxy Tab 3 7.0 and 10.1 as well as the new variant under the Galaxy Tab line and second 8-inch tablet made by Samsung which was the Samsung Galaxy Tab 3 8.0 which are again aimed at budget markets. The front-facing cameras have been upgraded back to 1.3 MP quality, the chip set for the three tablets are now manufactured by different chipmakers namely Marvell for the 7.0, Samsung for the 8.0, and Intel for the 10.1, and is significantly thinner thanks to the new unified Samsung Design. In addition, the tablets now support some of the features once reserved for the S and Note series such as the Smart Stay, S-Voice, and exclusively on the 8.0 is the Multi-Window . The 10.1" version retails for $399, the 8.0" version at $299 and the 7.0" version $199.

== See also ==
- List of Android devices
- Motorola Xoom
