= Dell Streak =

2010 Android smartphone

Dell Streak 5 / Dell Mini 5
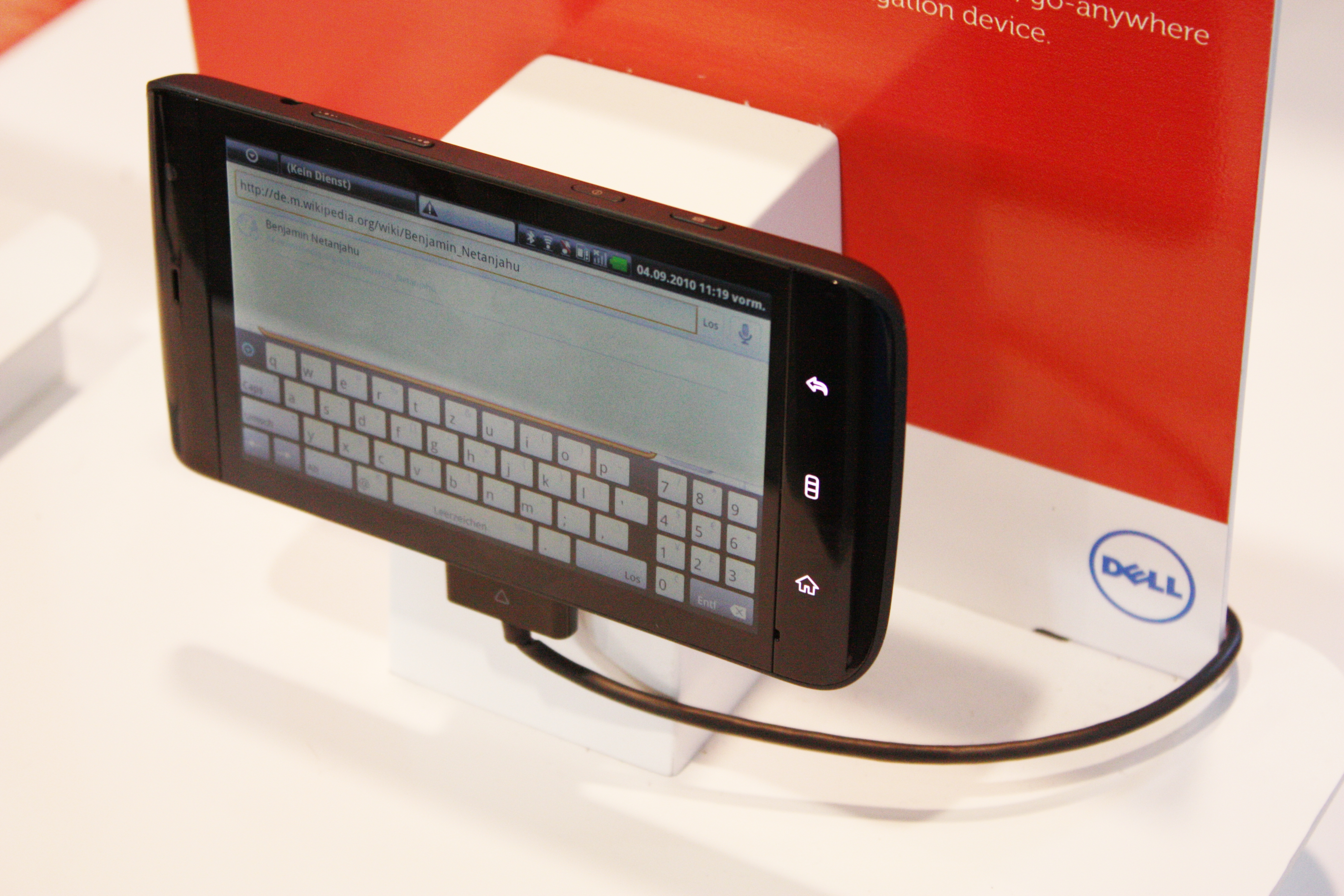
- Front face of the Dell Streak 5
- Manufacturer: Dell
- Type: Phablet
- Released: June 4, 2010 (UK)
- Introductory price: £399 on O2 (UK) Pay As You Go
- Operating system: Android 1.6 (Donut); upgrade Android 2.2 (Froyo) end of 2010
- CPU: 1 GHz Qualcomm QSD 8250 Snapdragon ARM or 600 MHz Qualcomm MSM7227
- Memory: 512 MB ROM + 512 MB SDRAM + 2 GB non-user accessible MicroSD for system & applications files only
- Storage: Flash memory: 1.63 GB; 1 microSD slot: expandable up to 32 GB
- Display: 800×480 px (0.38 Megapixels) at 186 Pixels Per Inch, 5 in (130 mm) WVGA in-cell TFT LCD with Gorilla Glass
- Graphics: Adreno 200
- Input: Multi-touch capacitive touchscreen display, Capacitive touch buttons, headset controls, 3-axis accelerometer
- Camera: 5.0 megapixel with video LED Dual LED flash on back, front-facing camera on top
- Connectivity: Wi-Fi (802.11b/g), Bluetooth 2.1+EDR, GPS with A-GPS, UMTS 2100 / 1900 / 850 MHz, GSM / EDGE 1900 / 1800 / 900 / 850 MHz, HSDPA / HSUPA:HSDPA, 7.2 Mbps / HSUPA 5.76 Mbps, PDMI
- Power: Removable 1530mAh battery
- Online services: Google Play
- Dimensions: 152.9 mm (6.02 in) (h); 79.1 mm (3.11 in) (w); 9.98 mm (0.393 in) (d)
- Weight: 220g

The Dell Streak 5 (previously known as the Dell Mini 5) is a phablet that uses the Android operating system, released in 2010. It comes with a 5-inch (13 cm) capacitive touchscreen and two cameras, a 5MP one with dual-LED flash on the back and a VGA-resolution one on the front for video calling; both are capable of video.

The three buttons at the bottom (or right, when held in its normal landscape mode) are capacitive. The Android buttons used are Home, Menu, and Back. It features a Dell skin on top and has a cradle adapter with HDMI out. The phone lacks the navigational trackball found in many previous Android devices. While FM radio support is not an official feature, an FM radio chip was found upon inspection of the Streak's internal hardware, and can be accessed through a user's modification of the OS.

A seven-inch version of the Streak was announced at the Consumer Electronics Show in January 2011. The Wall Street Journal reviewed it unfavorably in February. A long-rumored ten-inch model went on sale in August in China.

Dell discontinued the Streak 5 on as of August 15, 2011. Customers attempting to purchase the device were directed to a "Good Bye, Streak 5" landing page. The larger Streak 7 was discontinued on December 2, 2011; Dell continued to sell a 10-inch tablet in China at that time.

== Pre-release ==
The development was first disclosed in June 2009 and in October 2009 it was known that the tablet was capable of making 3G phone calls.

== Software ==
The versions released previously have had Android 1.6 installed, with Dell offering unlocked Streaks with Android 2.2 (Froyo) in December 2010.

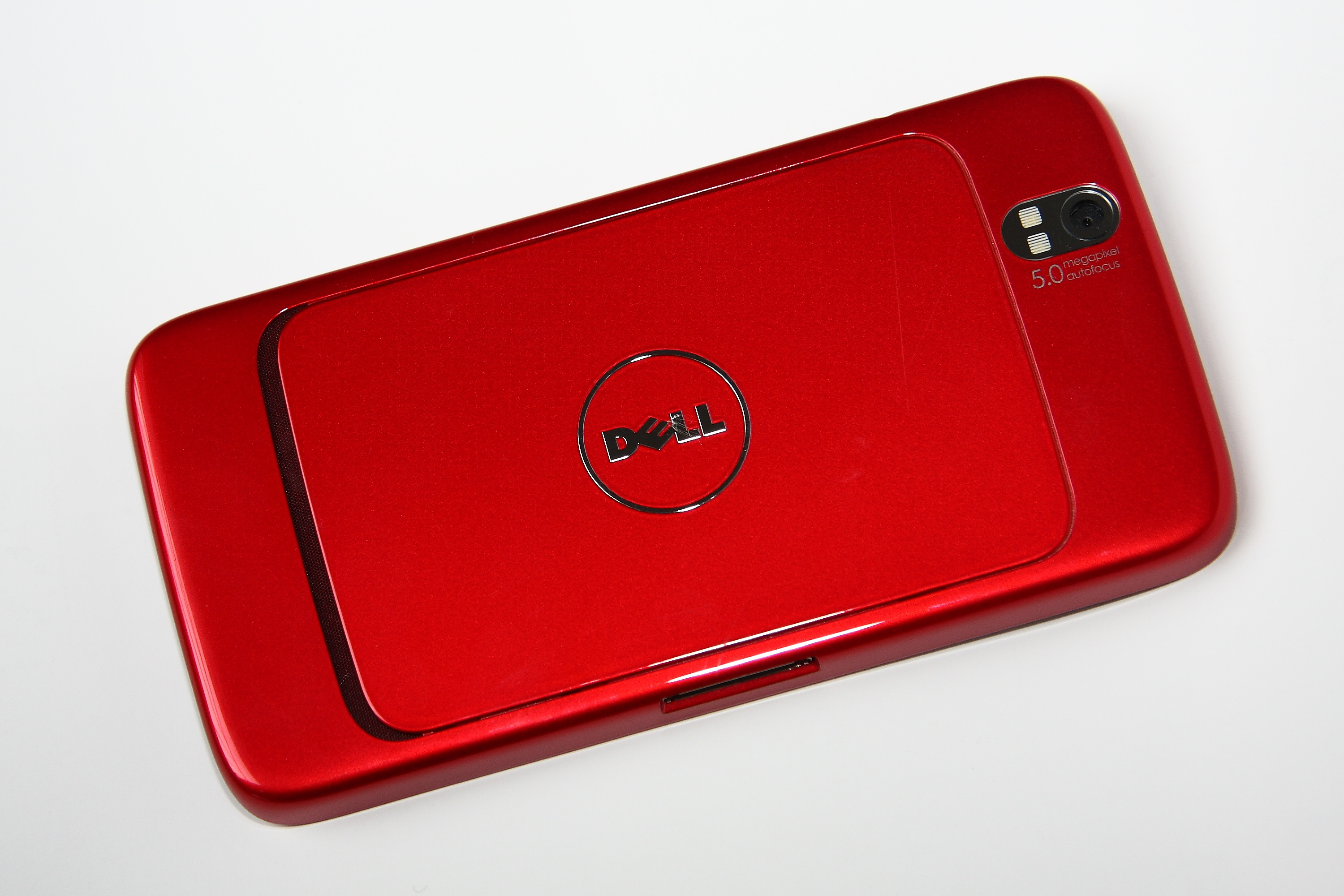
Streak 5, back side

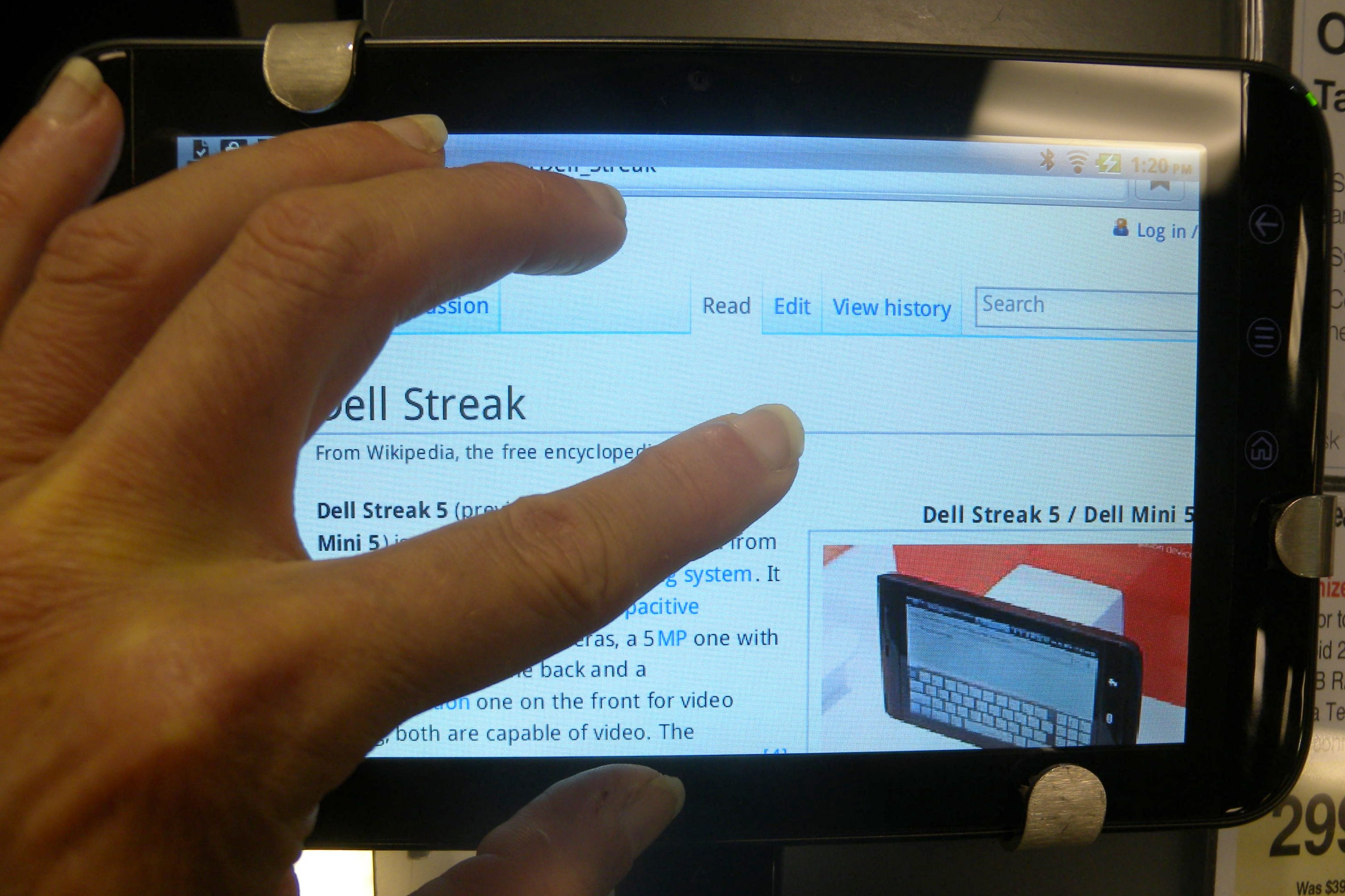
Streak 7

Customers on the British O2 mobile phone network were given the opportunity to install Android 2.1 in early September 2010 through an Over the Air update. This update, however, caused an uproar amongst consumers, over bugs and removal of some features from the previous software.

== Source code and rooting ==
Following protests from users that Dell, by not including source code, had violated the terms of the GNU General Public License, the source code for the Dell Streak became available for download.

There is a root method for the Dell Streak, and many roms are available, including iterations of the CyanogenMod ROM. These are available from the xda-developers website along with other ROMS.

== Reception ==
The Streak 7 received a tepid reaction from one reviewer due to its poor display and software bugs/glitches at launch. The Streak was considered bulky, and the Android 2.2 "Froyo" that it ran was geared more for smartphones instead of tablets. While almost all tablet computers released in 2011 had failed to gain much market share in the face of overwhelming demand for the Apple iPad 2, the Streak 7 compared poorly to other Android tablets such as the Samsung Galaxy Tab.

InfoWorld has suggested that Dell treated the Streak as a "Frankenphone business", where OEMs see tablets as a short-term, low-investment opportunity running Android OS, but this approach neglected the user interface and this failed to gain long term market traction with consumers.

== See also ==
- Dell Axim
- Dell Venue
- Samsung Galaxy Note (original)
