= Samsung Galaxy Tab 10.1 =

Tablet computer by Samsung

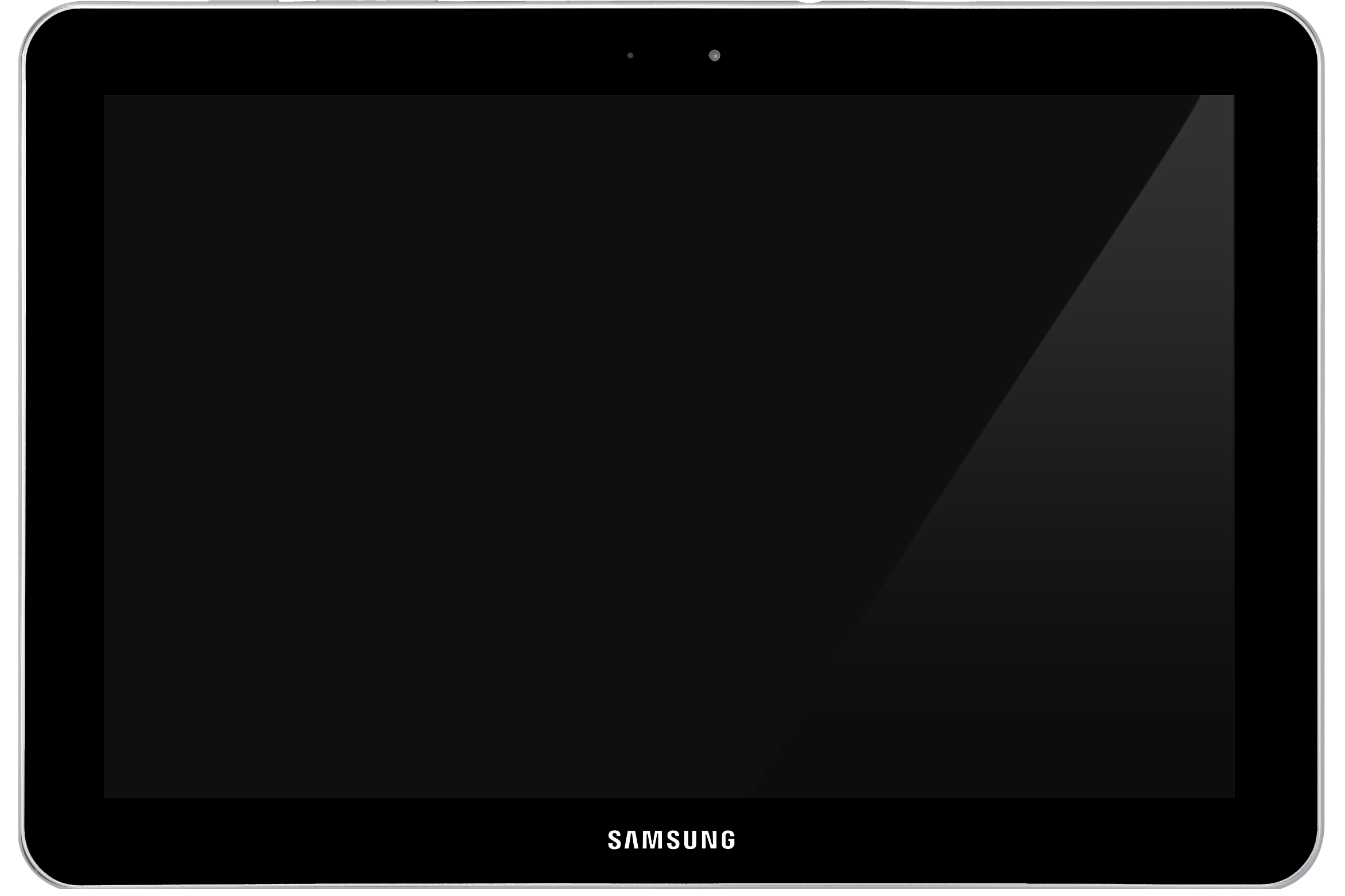
- Samsung Galaxy Tab 10.1
- Also known as: GT-P7100 (10.1v); GT-P7500 (WiFi+3G)/P7501 (10.1N); GT-P7510 (WiFi)/P7511 (10.1N); SCH-i905 (Verizon LTE); SGH-T859 (T-Mobile USA)
- Developer: Samsung Electronics
- Manufacturer: Samsung Electronics
- Product family: Galaxy Tab series
- Type: Tablet, media player, PC
- Released: June 8, 2011; 15 years ago
- Operating system: Android 3.1 "Honeycomb" (upgradable to Android 4.0.4 "Ice Cream Sandwich")
- CPU: 1 GHz dual-core Nvidia Tegra 2 processor
- Memory: 1 GB
- Storage: 16/32/64 GB flash memory
- Display: 1280×800 px, 10.1 in (260 mm) diagonal, 136 mm × 217 mm (5.35 in × 8.56 in), 149 ppi, Super PLS display
- Input: Multi-touch screen
- Camera: Galaxy Tab 10.1v 8.0 MP AF camera, 2.0 MP front facing Galaxy Tab 10.1; 3.1 MP AF camera, 2.0 MP front facing
- Connectivity: HSPA+ 21 Mbit/s 850/900/1900/2100 MHz; EDGE/GPRS 850/900/1800/1900 MHz; Wi-Fi 802.11a/b/g/n, Bluetooth 2.1 + EDR, HDMI (external cable)
- Power: Galaxy Tab 10.1v 6860 mAh battery Galaxy Tab 10.1; 7000 mAh battery
- Dimensions: Galaxy Tab 10.1v 246.2 mm (9.69 in) (H); 170.4 mm (6.71 in) (W); 10.9 mm (0.43 in) (D); Galaxy Tab 10.1; 256.7 mm (10.11 in) (H); 175.3 mm (6.90 in) (W); 8.6 mm (0.34 in) (D)
- Weight: Galaxy Tab 10.1v 599 g (1.321 lb); Galaxy Tab 10.1; 565 g (1.246 lb)
- Successor: Samsung Galaxy Tab 2 10.1
- Related: Samsung Galaxy S II; Samsung Galaxy Tab; Samsung Galaxy Tab 8.9
- Website: www.samsung.com/global/microsite/galaxytab/10.1/

The Samsung Galaxy Tab 10.1 is an Android-based tablet computer designed and manufactured by Samsung. It is part of the Samsung Galaxy Tab series, and features a 10.1-inch (260 mm) display and a 1 GHz dual-core Nvidia Tegra 2 processor.

== History ==
Samsung first showed a new Galaxy Tab model in January 2011 at the Mobile World Congress in Barcelona alongside the Samsung Galaxy S II. The original model featured a bigger 10.1" HD display with a dual-core Nvidia Tegra 2 SoC, running Google's Android 3.1 Honeycomb operating system, and was to be released in partnership with Vodafone. It was set for a US release in March 2011 and a European release in April. However, after the iPad 2 release, some specifications were described as "inadequate" by Lee Don-Joo, Samsung's CEO, pointing to a possible model review or a rethink of their market strategy.

This resulted in the introduction of a new, slimmer model at the Samsung Unpacked Event during the CTIA Wireless convention in March 2011, and an 8.9" model, pushing the release date back to 8 June for the US and "early summer" for the latter. The already produced larger 10.1 units were renamed the 10.1v and sold exclusively through Vodafone in Europe, Australia, and South Africa.

At Google I/O 2011, during the Android Keynote, Hugo Barra introduced the Galaxy Tab 10.1 to the public, announcing that Samsung would give one to every attendee, estimated at 5,000 units. This version is labelled as the "Samsung Galaxy Tab 10.1 Limited Edition". It sports a white Android-themed back cover, Android Debug Bridge, Fastboot, and a 7000 mAh (Milliamp Hour) battery. The rest of specifications are in line with the 32 GB version of the Galaxy Tab.

== Software ==
Both versions of the Galaxy Tab 10.1 run Android 3.1 Honeycomb. The 10.1v runs a "Pure Google" version with no customizations while the 10.1 runs a custom TouchWiz overlay. The latest OS version for Galaxy Tab 10.1 from Samsung is Android 4.0.4 Ice Cream Sandwich.

== Features ==
ChatON has basic features, including auto friends registration, text chat, & multimedia deliver, and put new features which are My Page, voice/video chat, & translate. The main function of ChatON is divided into Multimedia, Group Chat, Trunk, and Animation Message. ChatON can send text, picture, video, & audio as multimedia. Users use the personal profile into My Page. They can create group chat rooms just by selecting more than 2 buddies. All the contents that have been shared in each chat is saved into each trunk. Animation Message turns some simple drawing and stamping into short moving videos.

=== Update ===
Samsung gave users in Italy, UK, and United States the Android 4.0.4 Ice Cream Sandwich operating system for the Samsung Galaxy Tab 10.1 (excluding the 10.1v version) and the Samsung Galaxy Tab 8.9, at various points in August 2012.

Samsung rolled out an over-the-air update to the new Samsung Galaxy Tab A interface, which consisted of:

- Live Panels: A set of custom widgets and panels which will provide additional contents to Honeycomb, like weather, calendar, and more. The widgets and panels are resizable, following a grid pattern.
- Mini Apps Tray: An additional dock-like bar which will give access to the most commonly used applications.
- Social Hub: An integrated messaging application which aims to center the user's social life, unifying the inboxes and timelines of multiple services like Gmail, Facebook, Twitter, and many others, splitting them into "Feeds" (updates) and "Messages".
- Reader's Hub: A store that will allow the user to download e-books to the Galaxy Tab. Samsung claims that it will feature around 2 million books, 2,000 newspapers in 49 languages, and 2,300 magazines in 22 languages, which is available only in the US.
- Media Hub: A video on demand service, which is available only in the US.
- Music Hub: A music on demand service, which is available in the US and now in Australia.

=== Linux ===
Linux distributions compiled for the ARM architecture have been successfully run via chroot.

A port of Ubuntu to run natively on the Samsung Galaxy Tab 10.1 has been currently in development as well, which boots via the moboot multiboot bootloader (using the same method as the Android port). The port is currently in an early alpha stage and is functional.

== Hardware ==
Both models of the Galaxy Tab 10.1 feature a Tegra2 T20 1 GHz dual-core processor, 1 GB RAM, and a 3-axis MPU-3050 gyroscope from InvenSense.

As with all Honeycomb tablets, the number of buttons has been reduced: The usual Home, Menu, Back, and Search buttons, which are present in most Android devices, are embedded in the notification and menu bar. The only physical buttons are Power, Volume Up, and Volume Down.

The Galaxy Tab 10.1v and the slimmer Tab 10.1 include stereo speakers. The 10.1v has two speakers on each side, the 10.1 one on each side, and related 8.9 on the bottom.

The Galaxy Tab 10.1 retains the Samsung PDMI-like proprietary interface connector, which is used for both charging and data transfer.

There is a keyboard dock for the 10.1 only (parts number ECR-K14AWEGSTA - also compatible with the 8.9 using a separate detachable dock slot). A demonstration of it has been registered on https://www.youtube.com/watch?v=MRRBm6l9wNk&t=18s

All models will be shipped with a 2 MP front-facing camera. However, while the Galaxy Tab 10.1v has an 8 MP rear camera, the slimmer model has a 3 MP rear camera, due to volume reduction in the new models.

The slimmer model also supports 4G connectivity and dual Wi-Fi a/b/g/n antennas, which can operate at 2.4 and 5 GHz frequencies.

A USB host adapter was made available in June 2011. The dongle plugs into the 30-pin dock connector and allows USB compatible accessories such as keyboards, mice, and thumb drives, to be connected to the tablet. No other accessories have been released by Samsung in Australia or New Zealand for the 10.1v. 10.1 Accessories are not compatible with the 10.1v due to the physical design differences.

== Reviews ==
Initial reviews of the product were mixed. CNET said it was "the sexiest Honeycomb tablet in the market, though lagging in performance". TechSpot wrote: "The Galaxy Tab 10.1 features a large, wide-screen display that looks sharp and bright, and it rests inside a body that is incredibly thin and light. This 10-inch tablet weighs less than a number of smaller tablets on the market, yet it still packs a dual-core 1 GHz processor and the latest version of Android 3.1 Honeycomb."

== Apple patent lawsuit ==
Samsung's Galaxy Tab has become the subject of patent and design infringement lawsuits from Apple. Apple has concurrent intellectual property infringement claims against other manufacturers, namely Motorola Mobility (MMI) and HTC.

The Galaxy Tab's alleged infringements have resulted in injunctions being granted preventing sales of the computer in Australia that forced the cancellation of its launch there. Samsung has voluntarily withheld sales of the tablet in good faith prior to the legal resolution, hence it is not available for official sale in Australia - a grey import market exists however. The legal substance of the suit is infringement of input gestures such as pinching which Apple claims infringe their patents.

On 10 August 2011, a German court granted a preliminary injunction pending a full hearing prohibiting Galaxy Tab 10.1 sales in the European Union (except in the Netherlands, where a second action is running). Although Samsung is accused of violating 10 separate patents Apple holds on transmission of data and on wireless communications technology, the injunction was granted on the basis of an alleged infringement of one of Apple's registered community designs relating to the iPad 2. Press sources reported that customs officials across the European Union have seized inbound shipments of the product after the ruling, effectively locking it out of the key European market, and its listing was removed by online retailer Amazon.co.uk. Samsung stated it did not receive a notice of Apple's request to stop sales of its tablet. It has retaliated against Apple's move with counterclaims at home in South Korea and abroad in Japan, the U.S., and Germany.

The Dutch magazine Webwereld reported an investigation into evidence contrasting the two devices submitted to the German court by Apple, in which the Galaxy Tab pictured does not accurately reflect the product in terms of its shape. An example from the court document shows the Samsung device with aspect dimensions much closer to Apple's device, and the Samsung logo appears to have been digitally removed. Additionally, the Galaxy Tab is shown with the Application drawer in contrast to the iPad in its home screen, which gives the impression of a similar user interface.

On 16 August, the injunction had been partly suspended on the grounds that the court may not have the authority to ban sales across the EU. The injunction would not extend beyond Germany.

On 9 September, a German court has upheld a ban on the sale of Samsung's Galaxy Tab, saying it did infringe Apple designs, a decision which Samsung intended to appeal. This ruling, however, affects only Germany; and the device continues to be available for sale within the country. The ruling was reported as "having no practical consequences" for Samsung.

On 12 October, Australian Federal Court Justice Anabelle Bennett granted Apple's bid to continue an injunction against the sale of the Galaxy Tab 10.1 in Australia. The injunction prevents Samsung from selling its popular tablet until the lawsuit between Apple and Samsung is resolved or there is another court order to lift the injunction. However, the Galaxy Tab 10.1 remains readily available through online retailers and auction sites. On 30 November, the injunction was overturned by the Federal Court.

On 17 November 2011, Samsung released a new version of the Galaxy Tab called Galaxy Tab 10.1N. The new device now has the metal frame extending over the sides and repositioned speakers.

Samsung Electronics will be allowed to sell its latest Galaxy tablet computer including Samsung Galaxy Tab 10.1 in Australia since December 3, 2011 after it won a victory against Apple and overturned a sales ban in the country. There are around 20 legal disputes in 9 countries including the U.S., Japan and the U.K. between Samsung and Apple.

After European Union lift the ban, except Germany, finally Germany issued a preliminary ruling on December 23, 2011 that the Samsung tablet no longer violates Apple's European design patent with a final verdict will be handed down on February 9, 2012 over Samsung Galaxy Tab 10.1N. Samsung Galaxy Tab 10.1N was a new version with a number of changes to the design when Apple won a block on sales of the original Galaxy Tab 10.1 in the country in September 2011. Samsung has changed the design of the tablet PC sufficiently, making it clear to consumers that it was different from Apple's iPad, said the German judge.

=== Sales ban ===
On 26 June 2012, Apple was granted a request for a preliminary injunction against the sale of Samsung Galaxy Tab 10.1 in United States by District Judge Lucy Koh in San Jose, California. The sales ban was to be effective after Apple paid a $2.6 million bond to protect against damages suffered by Samsung if the injunction is later found to have been wrong. On 1 October 2012, the sales ban was lifted.

== See also ==
- Comparison of tablet computers
- Acer Iconia
- ASUS Eee Pad Transformer
- Motorola Xoom
- T-Mobile G-Slate

Preceded by -	Samsung Galaxy Tab 10.1; 2011	Succeeded by Samsung Galaxy Tab 2 10.1
