= The Venue =

The Venue may refer to:

- The Venue (Leeds), a concert space at Leeds Conservatoire, West Yorkshire, England
- The Venue (Leicester Square, London), now the Leicester Square Theatre
- The Venue (Victoria Street, London), a 1978–1984 music venue and nightclub owned by Virgin
- O2 Academy Oxford, previously The Venue, Oxford, England
- The Venue (New Cross, London), a nightclub in New Cross, London
- The Venue at UCF, a sports and entertainment arena at the University of Central Florida, U.S.
- "The Venue" (Brooklyn Nine-Nine), a 2017 TV episode
