= Dell Venue =

Line of android smartphones and tablets by Dell

- Manufacturer: Dell
- Type: Smartphone
- Discontinued: June 30, 2016
- Compatible networks: GSM 850/900/1800/1900; WCDMA 850/1900/2100 or 900/AWS/2100
- Form factor: Slate
- Dimensions: 121 mm (4.8 in) H 64 mm (2.5 in) W 12.9 mm (0.51 in) D
- Weight: 5.8 oz (160 g)
- Operating system: Android 2.2 "Froyo"; Upgradeable to Android 2.3 "Gingerbread"
- CPU: 1 GHz Qualcomm Snapdragon QSD8250
- Memory: 512 MB
- Storage: 1 GB
- Removable storage: microSD card; 16 GB included, max 32 GB
- Battery: Lithium-ion (1400 mAh)
- Rear camera: 8.0-megapixel (720p video recording)
- Display: 4.1” AM-OLED with 800x480 resolution, 24-bit, 16 M colors
- Connectivity: Wi-Fi; Bluetooth 2.1; Micro-USB; GPS; 3.5mm headset jack
- Data inputs: Capacitive Touchscreen
- Other: Curved Corning Gorilla Glass
- Website: Official website

The Dell Venue (formerly codenamed Dell Thunder) was a line of Android smartphones and tablets manufactured by Dell. The first Dell Venue was released for both T-Mobile and AT&T in the United States, and for KT in South Korea. It was the second Dell smartphone to be released in the US and featured the Dell Stage UI also found on the Dell Streak line of tablets. As of 2011, it was the only Android device the United States Department of Defense had approved for its employees' use. Since then there have been other approved devices.

On June 30, 2016, Dell discontinued the Venue line of products and ended support for currently supported products.

== Repositioning of Dell Venue brand ==
In December 2012, Dell announced that they would quit the smartphone business and discontinue their line of Dell Venue Pro smartphones. On October 2, 2013, Dell announced that they would revive the Dell Venue brand and transform it into a tablet brand. The Dell Venue brand subsequently included both Windows and Android tablets, with the Windows tablets having the suffix 'Pro'.

In October 2013, Dell announced the first four new Dell Venue tablets. The Dell Venue 7 and Dell Venue 8 were both Android tablets powered the Intel Clover Trail+ Atom processor. The Dell Venue 8 Pro and Dell Venue 11 Pro were both Windows 8.1 tablets powered by the Intel Bay Trail Atom processor. The number after Venue indicates the screen size.

In January 2015, the Dell Venue 8 7000 was released. It had an 8.4-inch screen, was 0.24" thick, and weighed 10.72 oz. The OLED screen had a 2560x1600 resolution with 361 ppi. Its CPU was a 2.3 GHz quad-core Intel Atom Z3580 processor with 2GB of RAM. It had 16GB of internal storage, with about 9GB usable due to pre-installed software, and had a microSD card slot as of Dell Latitude 12 Rugged Tablet.

== See also ==
- Dell Streak
- Dell Venue Pro
- List of Android devices
