= Samsung Galaxy Tab 8.9 =

Tablet computer by Samsung

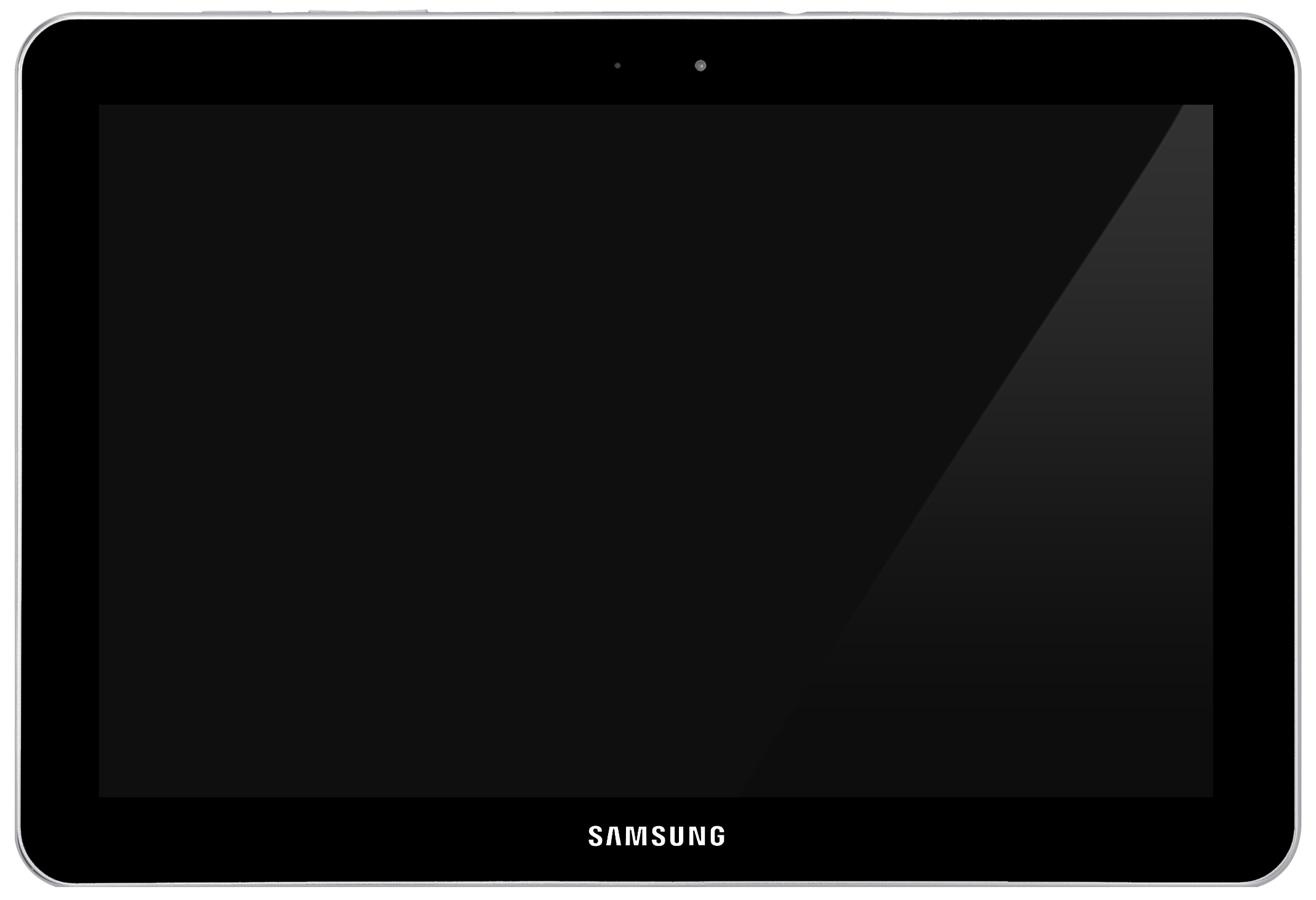
- Samsung Galaxy Tab 8.9
- Also known as: GT-P7300, GT-P7310
- Manufacturer: Samsung Electronics
- Product family: Galaxy Tab series
- Type: Tablet, media player, PC
- Released: October 2, 2011; 14 years ago
- Operating system: Android 3.1 "Honeycomb"; Upgradable to Android 4.0.4 "Ice Cream Sandwich"
- CPU: 1 GHz dual-core Nvidia Tegra 2 processor
- Memory: 1 GB
- Storage: 16/32/64 GB flash memory
- Display: 1280×800 px (1 megapixel), 8.9 in (23 cm) diagonal (5.35×8.56 in), 170 ppi, Super PLS display
- Input: Multi-touch screen
- Camera: 3.1 MP AF camera with LED flash, 2.0 MP front-facing (for video calls)
- Connectivity: HSPA+ 21 Mbit/s 850/900/1900/2100 MHz; EDGE/GPRS 850/900/1800/1900 MHz; Wi-Fi 802.11a/b/g/n, Bluetooth 2.1 + EDR, HDMI (external cable)
- Power: 6000 mAh battery
- Dimensions: 230.9 mm (9.09 in) H 157.8 mm (6.21 in) W 8.6 mm (0.34 in) D
- Weight: 453 g (0.999 lb)
- Related: Samsung Galaxy S II; Samsung Galaxy Tab; Samsung Galaxy Note 8.0; Samsung Galaxy Tab 3 8.0
- Website: Galaxy Tab 8.9 microsite

The Samsung Galaxy Tab 8.9 is an Android-based tablet computer designed and manufactured by Samsung, introduced on 22 March 2011 at the CTIA wireless convention in its Samsung Unpacked event in Orlando. It is part of the Samsung Galaxy Tab series, and features an 8.9-inch display and a 1 GHz dual-core Nvidia Tegra 2 processor.

== History ==
Coinciding with Samsung's reintroduction of the new, slimmer 10.1" model at the Samsung Unpacked Event during CTIA Wireless convention in March 2011, it also released a new 8.9" model which packed with the same design, dimension and specs with the only difference in the screen size and was released on 2 October.

== Software ==
The Galaxy Tab 8.9 runs Android 3.1 Honeycomb with a custom TouchWiz overlay.

== Features ==
=== Update ===
Samsung has now given users in Italy, UK, and United States the Android 4.0.4 Ice Cream Sandwich operating system to the Samsung Galaxy Tab 8.9 and the Samsung Galaxy Tab 10.1, at various points in August 2012.

Samsung has begun rolling out an over-the-air update to the new TouchWiz UX interface, which will consist of:

- L!ve Panels: A set of custom widgets and panels which will provide additional contents to Honeycomb, like weather, calendar, and more. The widgets and panels are resizable, following a grid pattern.
- Mini Apps Tray: An additional dock-like bar which will give access to the most commonly used applications.
- Social Hub: An integrated messaging application which aims to center the user's social life, unifying the inboxes and timelines of multiple services like Gmail, Facebook, Twitter, and many others, splitting them into "Feeds" (updates) and "Messages".
- Reader's Hub: A store that will allow the user to download e-books to the Galaxy Tab. Samsung claims that it will feature around 2 million books, 2,000 newspapers in 49 languages, and 2,300 magazines in 22 languages, which is available only in the US.
- Media Hub: A video on demand service, which is available only in the US.
- Music Hub: A music on demand service, which is available in the US and now in Australia.

== Hardware ==
The Galaxy Tab 8.9 feature a 1 GHz dual-core processor, 1 GB RAM, and a 3-axis MPU-3050 gyroscope from InvenSense.

As with all Honeycomb tablets, the number of buttons has been reduced: The usual Home, Menu, Back, and Search buttons, which are present in most Android devices, are embedded in the notification and menu bar. The only physical buttons are Power, Volume Up, and Volume Down.

The Galaxy Tab 8.9 include stereo speakers, one on each side, and related 10.1 on the bottom.

The Galaxy Tab 8.9 retains the Samsung PDMI-like proprietary interface connector, which is used for both charging and data transfer. There is a keyboard dock for the 8.9 using a separate detachable dock slot (also compatible with the 10.1 without the need for connector).

All models will be shipped with a 2 MP front-facing camera and has a 3 MP rear camera, due to volume reduction in the new models.

It also supports 4G connectivity and dual Wi-Fi a/b/g/n antennas, which can operate at 2.4 and 5 GHz frequencies.

A USB host adapter was made available in June 2011. The dongle plugs into the 30-pin dock connector and allows USB compatible accessories such as keyboards, mice, and thumb drives, to be connected to the tablet.

== Reviews ==
Initial reviews of the product were mixed. CNET said it "packs the full Android Honeycomb tablet experience along with Samsung's useful customizations into a compact body. This 8.9-inch tablet still escapes the awkward in-between nature of 7-inch tablets (including the original Tab) and large enough to make Web pages and documents appear life-size"

== Apple patent lawsuit ==
Samsung's Galaxy Tab has become the subject of patent and design infringement lawsuits from Apple. Apple has concurrent intellectual property infringement claims against other manufacturers, namely Motorola Mobility (MMI) and HTC.

The Galaxy Tab's alleged infringements have resulted in injunctions being granted preventing sales of the computer in Australia that forced the cancellation of its launch there. Samsung has voluntarily withheld sales of the tablet in good faith prior to the legal resolution, hence it is not available for official sale in Australia - a grey import market exists however. The legal substance of the suit is infringement of input gestures such as pinching which Apple claims infringe their patents.

On 10 August 2011, a German court granted a preliminary injunction pending a full hearing prohibiting Galaxy Tab 8.9 sales in the European Union (except in the Netherlands, where a second action is running). Although Samsung is accused of violating 10 separate patents Apple holds on transmission of data and on wireless communications technology, the injunction was granted on the basis of an alleged infringement of one of Apple's registered community designs relating to the iPad 2. Press sources reported that customs officials across the European Union have seized inbound shipments of the product after the ruling, effectively locking it out of the key European market, and its listing was removed by online retailer Amazon.co.uk. Samsung stated it did not receive a notice of Apple's request to stop sales of its tablet. It has retaliated against Apple's move with counterclaims at home in South Korea and abroad in Japan, the U.S., and Germany.

The Dutch magazine Webwereld reported an investigation into evidence contrasting the two devices submitted to the German court by Apple, in which the Galaxy Tab pictured does not accurately reflect the product in terms of its shape. An example from the court document shows the Samsung device with aspect dimensions much closer to Apple's device, and the Samsung logo appears to have been digitally removed. Additionally, the Galaxy Tab is shown with the Application drawer in contrast to the iPad in its home screen, which gives the impression of a similar user interface.

On 16 August the injunction had been partly suspended on the grounds that the court may not have the authority to ban sales across the EU. The injunction would not extend beyond Germany.

On 9 September a German court has upheld a ban on the sale of Samsung's Galaxy Tab, saying it did infringe Apple designs, a decision which Samsung intended to appeal. This ruling, however, affects only Germany; and the device continues to be available for sale within the country. The ruling was reported as "having no practical consequences" for Samsung.

On 12 October, Australian Federal Court Justice Anabelle Bennett granted Apple's bid to continue an injunction against the sale of the Galaxy Tab in Australia. The injunction prevents Samsung from selling its popular tablet line which includes the then to be released 8.9 until the lawsuit between Apple and Samsung is resolved or there is another court order to lift the injunction. However, the Galaxy Tab 8.9 became readily available through online retailers and auction sites. On 30 November, the injunction was overturned by the Federal Court.

Samsung Electronics will be allowed to sell its latest Galaxy tablet computer including Samsung Galaxy Tab 8.9 in Australia since December 3, 2011 after it won a victory against Apple and overturned a sales ban in the country. There are around 20 legal disputes in 9 countries including the U.S., Japan and the U.K. between Samsung and Apple.

=== Sales ban ===
On 26 June 2012, Apple was granted a request for a preliminary injunction against the sale of Samsung Galaxy Tab line in United States by District Judge Lucy Koh in San Jose, California. The sales ban was to be effective after Apple paid a $2.6 million bond to protect against damages suffered by Samsung if the injunction is later found to have been wrong. On 1 October 2012, the sales ban was lifted.

== See also ==
- Comparison of tablet computers
- Acer Iconia
- Asus Eee
- Google Nexus 7
- Motorola Xyboard
- T-Mobile G-Slate
