= Music on demand =

Music-on-demand (MOD) is a music recording industry certified multi-billion dollar music distribution & subscriber-based industry model conceived with the growth of two-way computing and telecommunications in the early 1990s. Primarily, high-quality music is made available to purchase by way of title subscription license, access by search, and play back instantly using software on set-top boxes (6 MHz separated guard band channels), coaxial, fiber optics, cellular mobile devices, Apple Macintosh, Microsoft Windows, from an available distribution point, such as a computer host or server located at a telephone, cable TV & wireless data center facility.

== History ==
In 1992, computer modem speeds were limited to less than 28 thousand bits per second (28 kbit/s), compared with uncompressed, pulse code modulated (PCM), music on compact disc (CD) that required 150 thousand bytes per second. As a result, additional bandwidth is required to accommodate delivering real-time audio at CD quality standards: 16-bit frame, 44.1 kHz sampling rate, stereophonic (two channel audio). This prompted telephony, CATV, cellular and satellite providers (Virginia Tech DoD cooperative) to consider changing standards, in terms of building higher capacity for existing telecommunications infrastructures and considering business use cases to offer supplemental, U.S. based private, affordable monthly on-demand service subscription plans with revenue split for compensation to music artists representation, licensing groups, telecommunications provider and music-on-demand solutions technology provider.

Early design, long range planning, and development of music-on-demand technology, in accordance with Performance, Mechanical, & Songwriting Copyright laws of the United States, include Access Music Network (AMN) by inventor & technology owner Dale Schalow. Mr. Schalow, in the early 1990s, was an independent audio engineer and programmer in Los Angeles, California, college educated in music industry with minor in keyboard, in the Shenandoah Valley, who helped record albums and music scores for David Bowie, Tin Machine, Cypress Hill, House of Pain, Beastie Boys, Interscope, Walt Disney, RJR_Nabisco, and Warner Brothers. A multiplexed music-on-demand model was deployed using PCM audio sampling devices, Apple IIci, the KERMIT, X-Modem, PCM CATV coax transmission standards for computer file and sound data transfer protocols, and SCSI storage systems by Schalow to validate processing 16-bit multi-channel audio from point-to-point in a professional recording studio environment, including his own independently operated music composition studio and 38 Fresh Recordings. The model conceived was introduced by Schalow to Apple Computer (after Steve Jobs departed) in 1992 after he submitted an entry into the "I Changed the World" contest, essentially describing how an Apple computer helped shape and change the world forever based upon its usage. Apple acknowledged the "Accessible Music Network" (AMN) by awarding Schalow Honorable Mention and sending him a simple gray T-shirt with the Apple logo on it. The technology, inspired after Schalow became frustrated at waiting for very slow digital mixes using a digital signal processor accelerated device (never ending progress bar), was also proposed to David Bowie in 1993, who a few years later, introduced his own network service, called David Bowie#Websites (Robert Goodale, Ron Roy), to the world. Initial demonstrations in 1993 also included the executive audiences at Virgin Records on Sunset Boulevard in Los Angeles, California, Bertelsmann Music Group located in New York City, New York, James Madison University (JMU) Executive & Telecommunications Administration, the Virginia Center of Innovative Technology (CIT), Mid-Atlantic University Cooperative Satellite groups, and America Online before Ted Leonsis developed and released its music download player software, $500 million outside vendor acquisition, and merger with Time-Warner, Inc. in Loudoun County, Virginia.

Stand-alone software created by AMN for consumer-based access, with demonstrated proof of concepts to numerous C-level executives & owners of Cable TV, Telco, and Cellular service providers in the United States, such as Denver TeleCommunications, Cox FiberNet (Blackwater region), Continental, Comcast/Adelphia, Vanguard (AT&T), Bell Atlantic, Telecable Corporation (Norfolk, Virginia). AMN was then developed for the Microsoft Windows computer operating system, as well as set-top box design architecture prototypes conceptualized with 3D prototypes that required a telephone connector located next to a coaxial cable TV connector to converge low speed data uplinking requests to a head-end file server with high speed downloading of audio frame sets by user (subscriber) controlled interactive communications. Cellular sound delivery packets, proposed to Craig McCaw of Cellular One and Vanguard Cellular, were devised by way of transmitted file bytes beginning with wireless connection initialization, file header, cyclic redundancy check (CRC), distributed sound data frames, "napsack" memory storage caching, and end of file transmit signaling before initiating embedded digital-to-analog playback technology.

== Today ==
Music-on-demand has steadily overcome controversy of illegal music distribution and the lag of legislation for rapidly changing technology in the music industry. The RIAA, representing U.S. artists, publishers and songwriters, officially reported in 2023, rapid growth in overall revenues of digital music & paid subscription sales that has surpassed 13 billion US dollars annually. Newer on-demand request technologies have also enhanced modalities & performance of music on demand content, such as speech-to-text search, and natural language processing. Every telecommunications device in the world currently includes music on demand commands & features to the consumer audience and marketplace.

== Bibliography ==
- TIME Magazine, 12 April 1993, Coming to Your TV Screen: The Info Highway
- "I Changed the World" Apple Computer Contest, Spring, 1992, Cupertino, CA
- Cable Television Issues, C-SPAN, Washington Metropolitan Cable Club, September 1993, Washington, DC
- Stern, Christopher (11 July 1994). "Bell Atlantic first with video dialtone". Broadcasting & Cable. 124 (28): 6. doi:10.2307/3116351. JSTOR 3116351.
- 2022 Year-End Music Industry Revenue Report | RIAA, March 2023
