= PDMI =

Interconnection standard

Portable Digital Media Interface (PDMI)

Production history
- Designer: CEA
- Designed: February 2010

General specifications
- Length: 22 mm
- Width: 2.5 mm
- Hot pluggable: Yes
- External: Yes
- Audio signal: Analog stereo, digital DisplayPort (1–8 channels, 16- or 24-bit linear PCM; 32 to 192 kHz sampling rate)
- Video signal: Digital 2-lane DisplayPort 1.1, 4.32 Gbit/s data rate
- Pins: 30 pins

Data
- Data signal: USB 3.0 SuperSpeed + 1 Mbit/s for the DisplayPort auxiliary channel

PDMI (Portable Digital Media Interface) is an interconnection standard for portable media players. It has been developed by CEA (Consumer Electronics Association) as ANSI/CEA-2017-A standard Common Interconnection for Portable Media Players in February 2010. Chaired by David McLauchlan from Microsoft, the standard was developed with the input or support of over fifty consumer electronics companies worldwide.

== Development and history ==
CEA-2017-A is the new revision of the earlier ANSI/CEA-2017 standard adopted in July 2007, which used a proprietary serial protocol based on Media Oriented Systems Transport (MOST) in-vehicle network; the 2007 revision has seen only marginal use in actual devices. New CEA-2017-A devices are not compatible with devices manufactured under the 2007 revision.

PDMI connector is intended to serve as a common interconnection between docking devices and displays and portable/nomadic devices with media playback capability. Intended host devices include docking stations for home A/V equipment, in-car entertainment systems, digital media kiosks, and hotel/in-flight entertainment systems, where PDMI aims to replace the ubiquitous iPod cradle connector.

PDMI uses a 30 pin receptacle with approximate size of 2.5 mm by 22 mm; a cradle-style connector is also defined. The PDMI connector includes the following electrical interfaces:

- 2-lane DisplayPort v1.1a with AUX Channel, Hot Plug Detect, and 3.3 V power line
- USB 3.0, USB 2.0, and USB On-The-Go
- Analog stereo line-out for legacy audio
- HDMI CEC for remote control
- High output power line from both host and portable device

DisplayPort component provides data rate of 4.32 Gbit/s and supports up to 1080p60 video and 8-channel audio playback on an attached display device, as well as EDID and display control commands. DisplayPort signal can be converted to HDMI format using active converter circuitry in the dock or external signal conversion adapter powered by 3.3 V DisplayPort power.

Power supply from both the host (docking station) and portable device allows for supporting the portable device with power and battery charging, as well as supporting accessories from the portable device.

USB 3.0 "SuperSpeed", USB 2.0, and USB On-The-Go support file transfer and device control, as well as device-to-device intercommunication.

== Devices that use PDMI ==
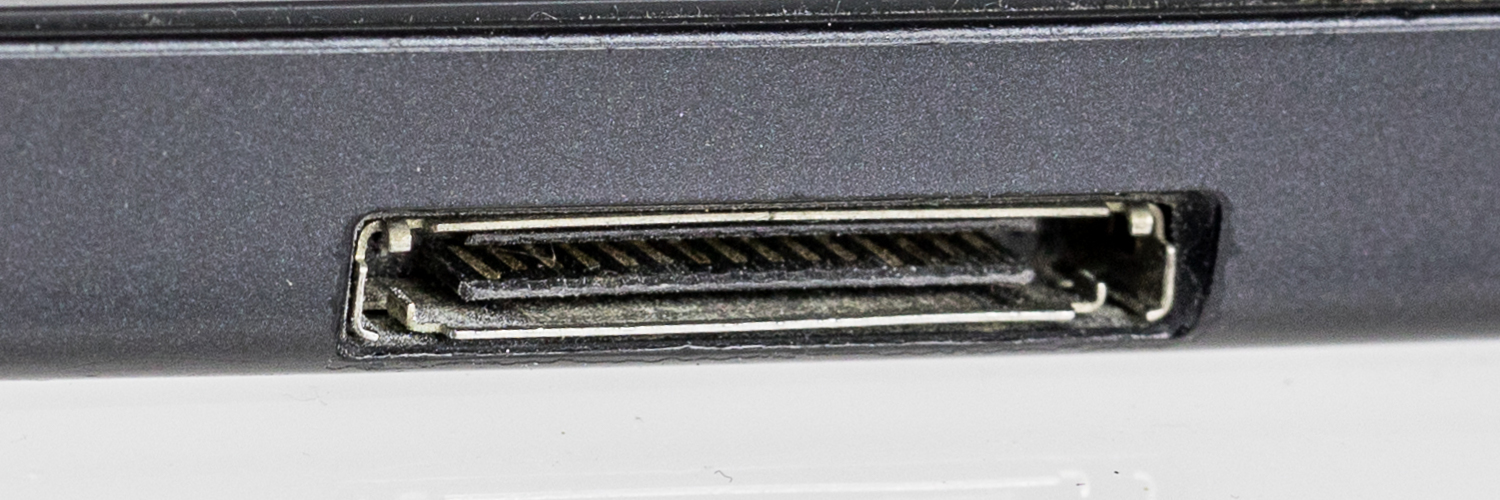
PDMI connector on a Dell Streak

The first mass-production device from a major manufacturer to incorporate PDMI is the Dell Streak, a 5 in (130 mm) tablet device running the Android operating system version 1.6 through 2.2.

Devices that use PDMI
Device Name	Release date	Notes
Advent Vega	19 November 2010	
Dell Streak	4 June 2010	
Boeing Black	2014.2Q	

== Pinout ==
PDMI pinout
Pin no.	Pin name	Interface grouping	Pin description
1	USB 5V	USB 2.0 Interface	USB Power (VBUS)
2	USB DGND	USB 2.0 Interface	USB Ground
3	USB D+	USB 2.0 Interface	Data +
4	USB OTG	USB 2.0 Interface	On‐The‐Go (allows device‐to‐device data transfer)
5	USB D−	USB 2.0 Interface	Data −
6	HC 5V	High-current Power (output on host)	High-current 5 V supply (1.8 A, or 3.6 A if combined with pin 15)
7	DGND / HC GND	High-current Power (output on host)	High-current Ground
8	AUDIO RIGHT OUT	Analog Audio (input on host)	Right analog audio output (line level)
9	AUDIO LEFT OUT	Analog Audio (input on host)	Left analog audio output (line level)
10	AUDIO OUT GND	Analog Audio (input on host)	Audio output ground
11	CEC	CEC	Consumer Electronic Control, for HDMI remote control
12	SSR−	USB 3.0 Data Device Receive	USB 3.0 SSRX− signal
13	GND	USB 3.0 Data Device Receive	Signal Ground
14	SSR+	USB 3.0 Data Device Receive	USB 3.0 SSRX+ signal
15	HC 5V	High-current Power (output from host)	High-current 5 V supply (1.8 A, or 3.6 A if combined with pin 6)
16	HC GND	High-current Power (output from host)	High-current Ground
17	SST−	USB 3.0 Data Device Transmit	USB 3.0 SSTX− signal
18	GND	USB 3.0 Data Device Transmit	Signal Ground
19	SST+	USB 3.0 Data Device Transmit	USB 3.0 SSTX+ signal
20	HPD	DisplayPort v1.1a Interface, 2 Lane (host is sink; device is source)	Hot Plug Detect (includes interrupt function from host)
21	DAUX+	DisplayPort v1.1a Interface, 2 Lane (host is sink; device is source)	AUX Channel +
22	DAUX−	DisplayPort v1.1a Interface, 2 Lane (host is sink; device is source)	AUX Channel −
23	AP	DisplayPort v1.1a Interface, 2 Lane (host is sink; device is source)	3.3 V DisplayPort Power (power from portable device)
24	D1−	DisplayPort v1.1a Interface, 2 Lane (host is sink; device is source)	Main Link Lane 1 (−)
25	GND	DisplayPort v1.1a Interface, 2 Lane (host is sink; device is source)	Signal Ground
26	D1+	DisplayPort v1.1a Interface, 2 Lane (host is sink; device is source)	Main Link Lane 1 (+)
27	GND	DisplayPort v1.1a Interface, 2 Lane (host is sink; device is source)	Signal Ground
28	D0−	DisplayPort v1.1a Interface, 2 Lane (host is sink; device is source)	Main Link Lane 0 (−)
29	GND	DisplayPort v1.1a Interface, 2 Lane (host is sink; device is source)	Signal Ground
30	D0+	DisplayPort v1.1a Interface, 2 Lane (host is sink; device is source)	Main Link Lane 0 (+)
