= Android Honeycomb =

2011 Android tablet operating system

- Version of the Android operating system
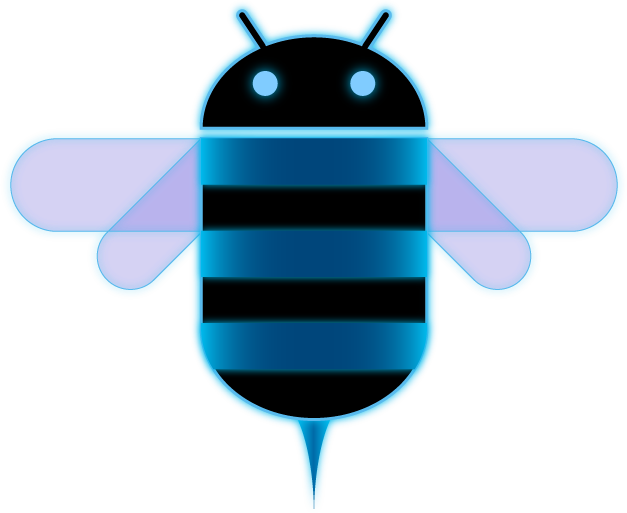

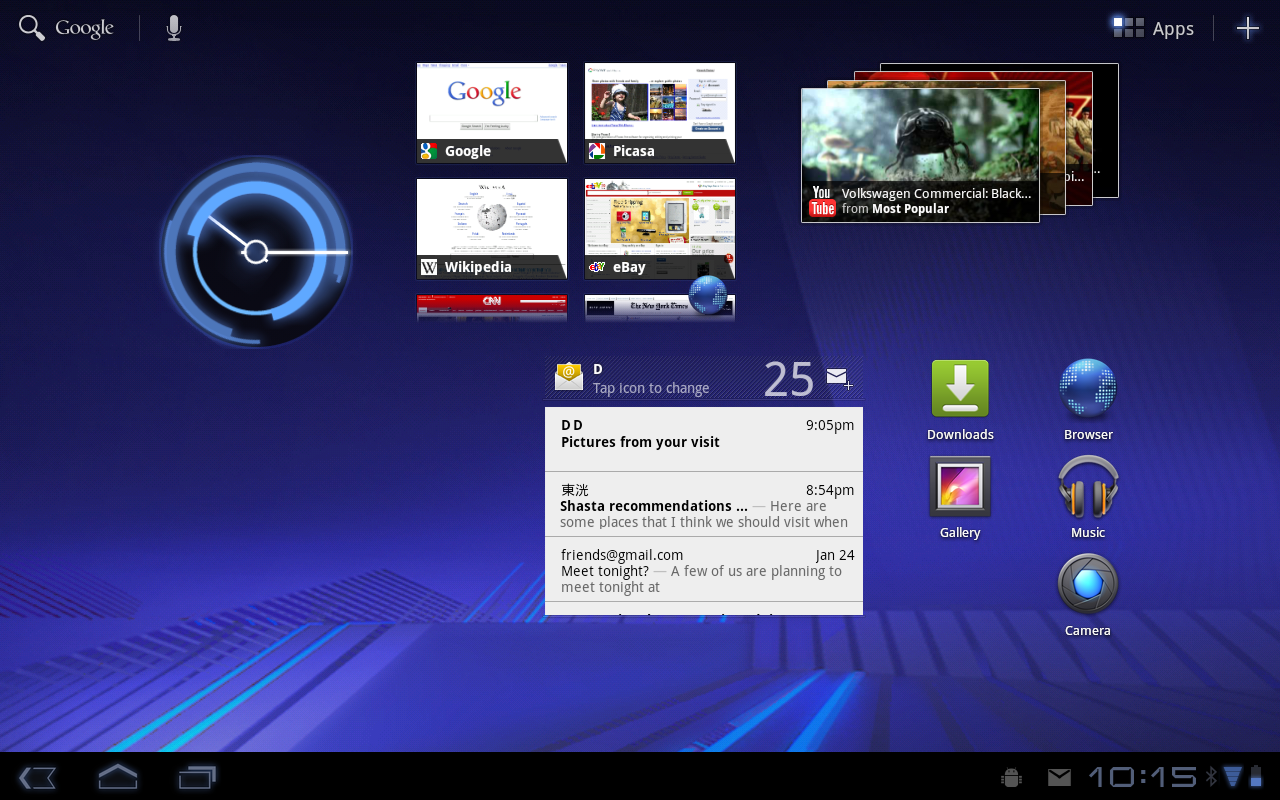
- Android 3.0 running on a Motorola Xoom
- Developer: Google
- Initial release: February 22, 2011; 15 years ago
- Final release: 3.2.6 / February 15, 2012; 14 years ago
- Kernel type: Monolithic (Linux)
- License: Proprietary software
- Preceded by: Android Gingerbread (2.3)
- Succeeded by: Android Ice Cream Sandwich (4.0)
- Official website: developer.android.com/about/versions/android-3.0-highlights

Support status
- Unsupported since November 14, 2016; Google Play Services support dropped since January 2017; Google Account support dropped

Android Honeycomb is the codename for the third major version of Android, designed for devices with larger screen sizes, particularly tablets. It is the eighth version of Android. It is no longer supported, as of November 14, 2016. Android Honeycomb debuted with the Motorola Xoom in February 2011. Besides the addition of new features, Android Honeycomb introduced a new so-called "holographic" user interface theme and an interaction model that built on the main features of Android, such as multitasking, notifications, and widgets.

== Features ==
New features introduced in Honeycomb include the following:

- The Email and Contacts apps use a two-pane UI.
- The Gallery app now lets users view albums and other collections in full-screen mode, with access to thumbnails for different photos in a collection.
- The Browser app replaces browser windows with tabs, adds an incognito mode for anonymous browsing, and presents bookmarks and history in a unified view, among other features.
- A redesigned keyboard to make entering text easier on large-screen devices such as tablet computers.
- A Recent Apps view for multitasking.
- Customizable home screens (up to five).

== See also ==
- Android version history
- iOS 4
- Mac OS X Snow Leopard
- Windows Phone 7
- Windows 7
