= Samsung Wave III =

Smartphone

The Samsung Wave III, more commonly designated as the Samsung S8600 Wave 3, was released in October 2011 as the successor to the Wave 2 line-up (the S5250, S5330, and S7230). It was a mid-range phone, and sold for €150 ($205).

== Specifications ==
=== Body ===
The dimensions of the phone are 125.9x64.2x9.9 mm (4.96x2.53x0.39 in). It comes in a single finish: black. The screen of the phone is protected by Corning Gorilla Glass. The back components of the phone are accessible by sliding an airbrushed aluminum shell upwards. The battery is removable, and removing the battery allows access to the mini-SIM and microSD ports. The camera, LED flash, and loudspeaker are all at the top of the phone on the back. Returning to the front of the phone, there is a single menu button, which is flanked by two capacitive call "buttons" which are activated by touch rather than physical actuation. The volume rocker is on the left side of the phone, and the lock button is on the right side. The two key differences between this model and the previous Wave 2 phones is the switch from physical call buttons to capacitive ones, and the removal of the dedicated camera button on the right side.

=== Screen ===
The phone display is a Super AMOLED which measures 4 inches along the diagonal, it can display 16M colors. It has a resolution of 480x800, and an area of 45.5 cm^2 (~233 ppi). The phone improves on the last generations' screen-to-body ratio with its own screen-to-body ratio of ~56.3%. The phone screen is protected by Corning Gorilla Glass. Software-wise, touch interaction happens via the TouchWiz UI, and the phone has handwriting recognition.

=== Hardware ===
The phone is powered by a single-core Scorpion processor Qualcomm S2 MSM8255T running at 1.4 GHz. It has 512MB of RAM and an initial storage capacity of 4GB, which is upgradable with an extra 32 GB with the microSD port.

=== Camera ===
The phone has a 5MP camera with LED flash and autofocus which shoots photos at a resolution of 2560x1920. It can shoot video at 720p @ 30fps. There is a 0.3MP front camera for video calls and selfies at 480p resolution. Photos can be edited via the photo editor.

=== Battery ===
The phone has a 1500 mAh rechargeable lithium-ion battery. Charging occurs via the microUSB port at the bottom of the phone. On stand-by the phone lasts for 535h on a 2G connection and 517h on a 3G connection. Talk time was 14h 15 minutes on a 2G network and 8h 40 minutes on a 3G network.

=== Connectivity ===
The phone can connect to both 2G (GSM 850/900/1800/1900 MHz) and 3G(UMTS 900/2100 MHz). The phone can tap into GPRS, EDGE, UMTS, HSDPA, and HSUPA networks. The phone can also tap into WiFi networks with a WiFi 4 chip, and connect to Bluetooth enabled devices with a Bluetooth 3.0 chip. Users can navigate with A-GPS and Samsung Mobile Navigator. Users can connect the device to a computer via the microUSB port. The phone has a built-in stereo FM radio.

=== Operating System ===
The phone comes pre-packaged with bada OS 2.0, but would not continue to receive updates since bada would be discontinued less than a year after the phones' launch.

=== Other Features ===
- MP3/WAV/WMA/eAAC+/FLAC player
- MP4/MKV/H.264/WMV/XVid/DivX player
- Accelerometer, proximity sensor, ambient light sensor, magnetometer (compass)
- Music recognition
- Document viewer
- Voice memo
- Predictive text input (T9 Trace)
