= Samsung Wave II S8530 =

Cell phone model

Samsung S8530 Wave II
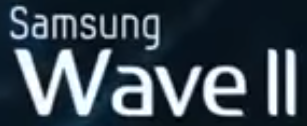

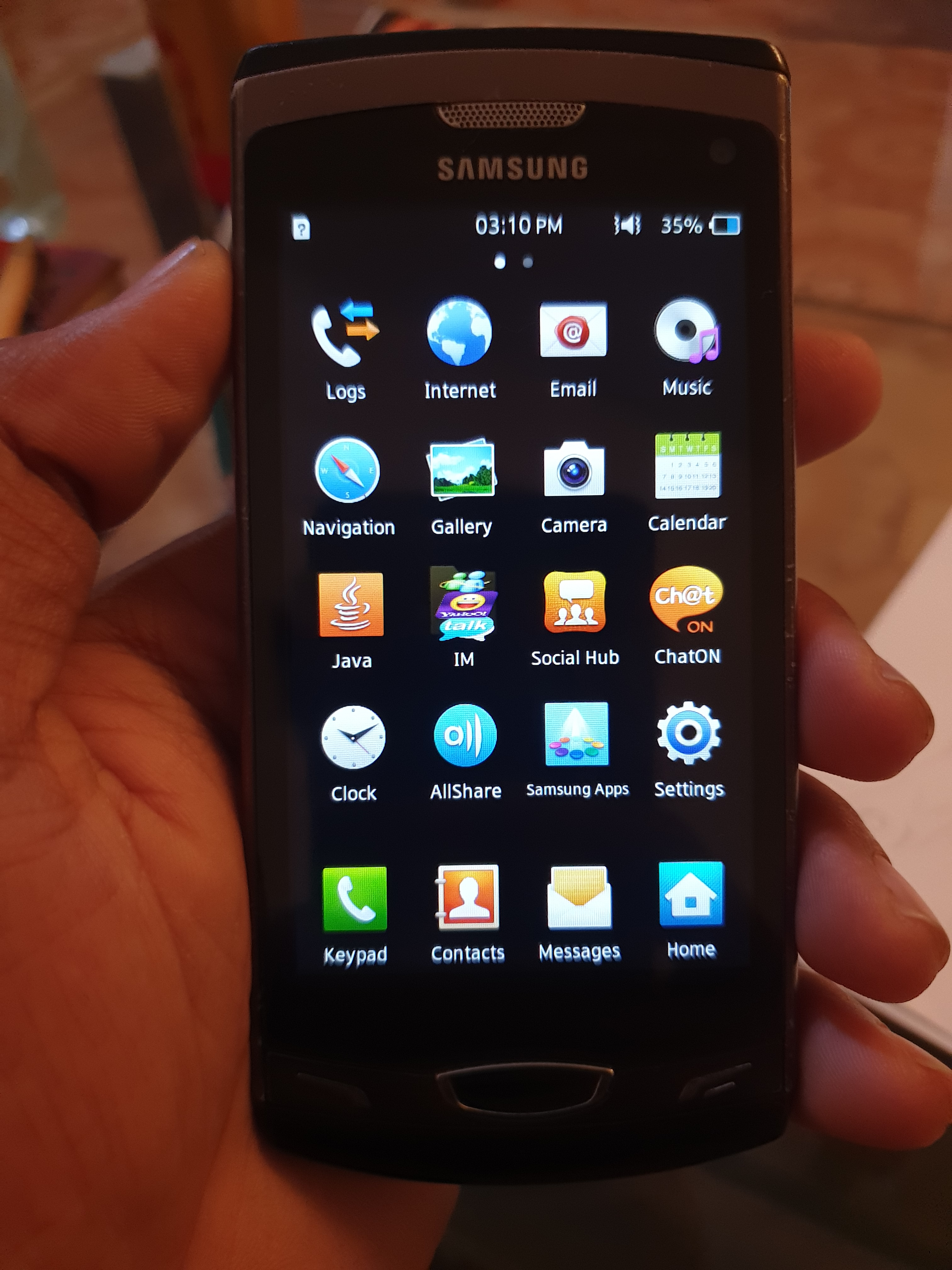
- Samsung Wave II S8530
- Manufacturer: Samsung Electronics
- Series: S-Series
- Availability by region: October 2010
- Predecessor: Samsung Wave S8500
- Successor: Samsung Wave S8600
- Related: Samsung Jet, Samsung Galaxy S, Samsung Wave S8500, Samsung Wave Y
- Compatible networks: GSM: 850/900/1800/1900/2100; 3G: 900/2100; HSDPA: 3.6 Mbit/s; HSUPA: 2 Mbit/s
- Form factor: Slate
- Dimensions: 123.9 mm × 59.8 mm × 11.8 mm (4.88 in × 2.35 in × 0.46 in)
- Weight: 135 g (4.8 oz)
- Operating system: bada 1.2 with TouchWiz 3.0
- CPU: ARM Cortex A8 clocked at 1 GHz (Samsung S5PC111)
- Memory: 256 MB of RAM
- Storage: 2 GB / 8 GB;
- Removable storage: microSD(HC) up to 32 GB
- Battery: Li-Ion 1500 mAh
- Rear camera: 5 MP (4:3)
- Display: 3.7" 800x480 @ 283 PPI Super Clear LCD with Gorilla Glass
- Media: MP3, AAC, AAC+, e-AAC+, WMA, AMR, WAV, MP4, FLAC, MPEG4, H.263, H.264, WMV, DivX, XviD, MKV, etc.
- Connectivity: 802.11b/g/n Wi-Fi, A-GPS, Bluetooth 3.0, microUSB 2.0
- Data inputs: T9 trace, Abc, QWERTY, Multi-touch input method, Handwriting recognition
- Other: Scratch-resistant surface; Smart unlock; Accelerometer; Proximity sensor; Magnetometer; Digital compass

The Samsung Wave II (model number GT-S8530) is a discontinued smartphone developed and produced by Samsung Electronics. It is the successor of the Samsung Wave S8500 smartphone and runs on Samsung's Bada 1.2 operating system, which was commercially released in October 2010. The Wave II is a touchscreen phone powered by a proprietary 1 GHz ARM Cortex-8 CPU and a built-in PowerVR SGX 540 graphics engine, SLCD and a 720p camera. As the phone contained an LCD, SlashGear speculated that the phone could be the result of a rumored AMOLED panel shortage.

== Hardware Features ==
=== Design ===
The phone's exterior is made from a 10.9 mm thick metal alloy, designed in a slate-style form factor. The front includes three physical buttons positioned below the screen: a call button, a reject/shutdown button, and a main menu button.

=== Display ===
The 800x480 WVGA display consists of a 3.7-inch (94 mm) Super LCD capacitive touchscreen with an anti-smudge oleophobic coating on top of the scratch-resistant tempered-glass (Gorilla Glass Display) touch panel.

=== Processor ===
The phone features a 1 GHz SoC containing an ARM Cortex-A8 CPU core – identical to the ARM Cortex CPU core used in Apple's A4 package on package SoC and PowerVR SGX 540 GPU core. The chip contains 256 MB+128 MB of onboard RAM (same hardware as the Samsung Wave S8500.)

=== Camera ===
The phone features a 5 megapixel camera which supports 2592x1944 pixel resolution, along with autofocus, a LED flash, Geotagging, face & blink detection, image stabilization, and touch focus. It can record 720p HD video (1280x720) at 30 FPS with flash and a 320x240 slow-motion video at 120 FPS with flash.

=== Connectivity ===
The Samsung Wave II supports Wi-Fi 802.11 b/g/n, HSDPA 3.2 Mbit/s and HSUPA 2 Mbit/s. It was one of the first phones to support Bluetooth version 3.0.

=== Other Features ===
Other features include A-GPS and 2 GB/8 GB of internal storage with a microSDHC slot for an additional 32 GB. It also has a magnetometer, a proximity sensor, an accelerometer, a 5.1-channel surround sound Mobile Theater, music recognition, a fake call service, smart search, and Social Hub.

This phone was available with European, Asian, and North American 3G bands. The North American 3G band version of the phone was limited availability and was not available in the US.

== Software Features ==
=== User Interface ===
The phone features the Samsung Bada operating system. The UI is using TouchWiz 3.0, which utilizes widgets. The 3 most notable widgets preinstalled in TouchWiz 3.0 are Daily Briefing, which includes information such as weather, finance, AP mobile news, and schedule, Feeds and Updates, and Buddies Now, allowing users to call, send texts to, and read Facebook or Twitter feeds off their contacts. Users are allowed to have up to 10 home screens to add widgets.

=== Applications ===
Samsung Wave is preinstalled with Dolphin Browser v2.0 (based on WebKit). While the browser supports Flash, it is disabled by default to improve page load time.

By default, the phone comes with Picsel Viewer, which is capable of reading .pdf documents and Microsoft Office file formats. Users from selected countries can buy and download Picsel Office Editor from Samsung Apps.

Users can also download applications and widgets from the application store.

Other software includes LBS Route 66, Palringo IM, Facebook, Twitter, Social Hub, Mini Diary, Daily Briefing, Memo, Video Player, FM Radio, Media Browser, Voice Recorder, E-mail, and Asphalt 5.

Media Support

The Samsung Wave supports the MP3, AAC, AAC+, e-AAC+, WMA, AMR, WAV, MP4, FLAC, MPEG4, H.263, H.264, WMV, AVI, DivX, XviD, MKV file formats for multimedia content.

Android Porting

Due to many owners of the phone disliking the Bada software, many people have worked on porting Android OS to the Wave 2. The known ported versions are Froyo, Gingerbread, Ice Cream Sandwich, Jelly Bean and KitKat. However, they are still being developed, and some features, such as GPS, may be limited or not function as intended.

== See also ==
- Exynos
- Amoled
