= Samsung Wave 723 =

Samsung mobile phone

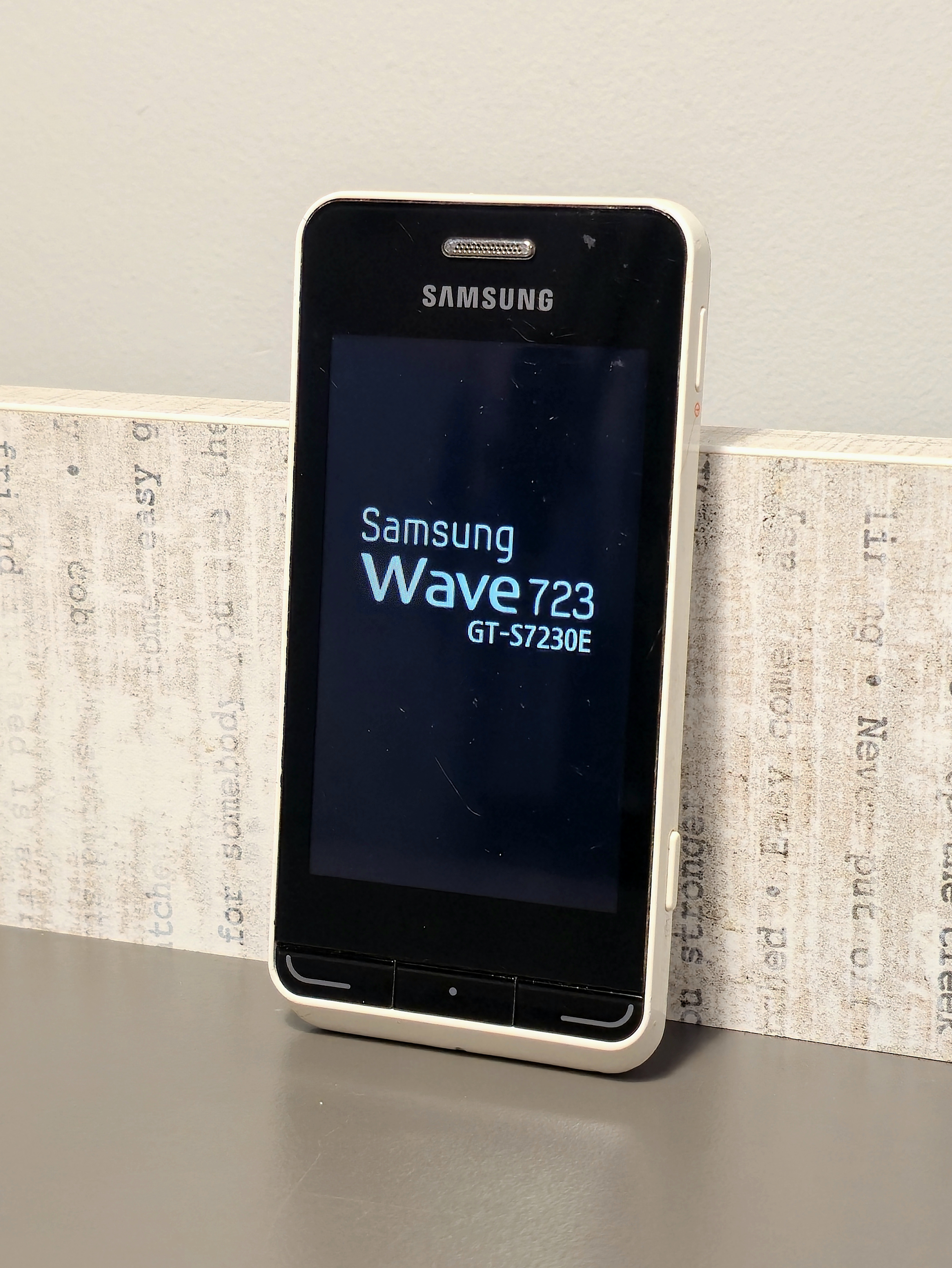
The Samsung Wave 723's splash screen

The Samsung Wave 723, or Samsung S7230, was released in October, 2010, alongside the Samsung Wave 525 and Samsung Wave 533. It was marketed as a mid-range phone, and cost around €130 ($170).

== Specifications ==
=== Body ===
The phone measures 109.5x53.9x11.8 mm (4.31x2.12x0.46 in). It has a metal casing with an airbrushed aluminum finish, which is available in three colors: Black, White, and the "La Fleur" Edition, which features a pink coloring scheme along with floral patterning on the back and screen of the phone. The phone weighs 100g (0.22 pounds). The screen has 3 buttons: two to initiate and end a call, and one for menu navigation. The volume buttons are found on the left of the chassis, and the camera activation and power/lock buttons are found on the right.

=== Screen ===
The screen is a TFT LCD capacitive touchscreen, which allows for user interaction without using the phone buttons. The screen measures 3.2 inches along the diagonal, with a total area of 29.1 cm^2 and a resolution of 240x400 (5:3 aspect ratio). It has a pixel density of ~146 ppi and is capable of displaying 256K colors.

=== Hardware ===
The device is powered by a single core CPU running at 450 mHz. There is an initial storage capacity of 90 MB which is upgradable with 16 GB additional storage via the microSD port.

=== Camera ===
The phone has a 5 MP camera with autofocus and LED flash. It can shoot video at 320p at 15 fps. The camera can be activated by the dedicated camera button, but not while you are using another widget. Photos can be edited via the photo editor.

=== Battery ===
The phone comes with a 1200 mAh Li-ion battery which is rechargeable via the microUSB port at the top of the phone. The battery provides about 700 hours standby time on a 2G network, and 600 hours on a 3G network. Likewise, talk time is around 14 hours and 20 minutes on 2G, and 6 hours and 45 minutes on 3G.

=== Connectivity ===
The phone can connect to both 2G (GSM 850/900/1800/1900 mHz bands) and 3G (UMTS 900/2100 mHz bands). The phone has a WiFi 4 chip, but can make a hotspot in case of low WiFi coverage. users can ascertain their location via A-GPS, can listen to Stereo FM radio, and can arrange data transfer between the phone and a computer via the microUSB 2.0 port.

=== Operating System ===
The phone comes pre-packaged with bada OS 1.1, with continued support for the phone by the operating system through bada 2.0.

=== Other Features ===
- Accelerometer
- Built-in WAP 2.0/xHTML, and HTML browser
- MP3/WAV/eAAC+ player
- MP4/H.264 player
- Voice memo recorder
- removable plastic flip cover with leather texture
