= Samsung Galaxy Tab A7 =

2020 mid-range tablets by Samsung Electronics

Samsung Galaxy Tab A7 Samsung Galaxy Tab A7 Lite Samsung Galaxy Tab A7 2022

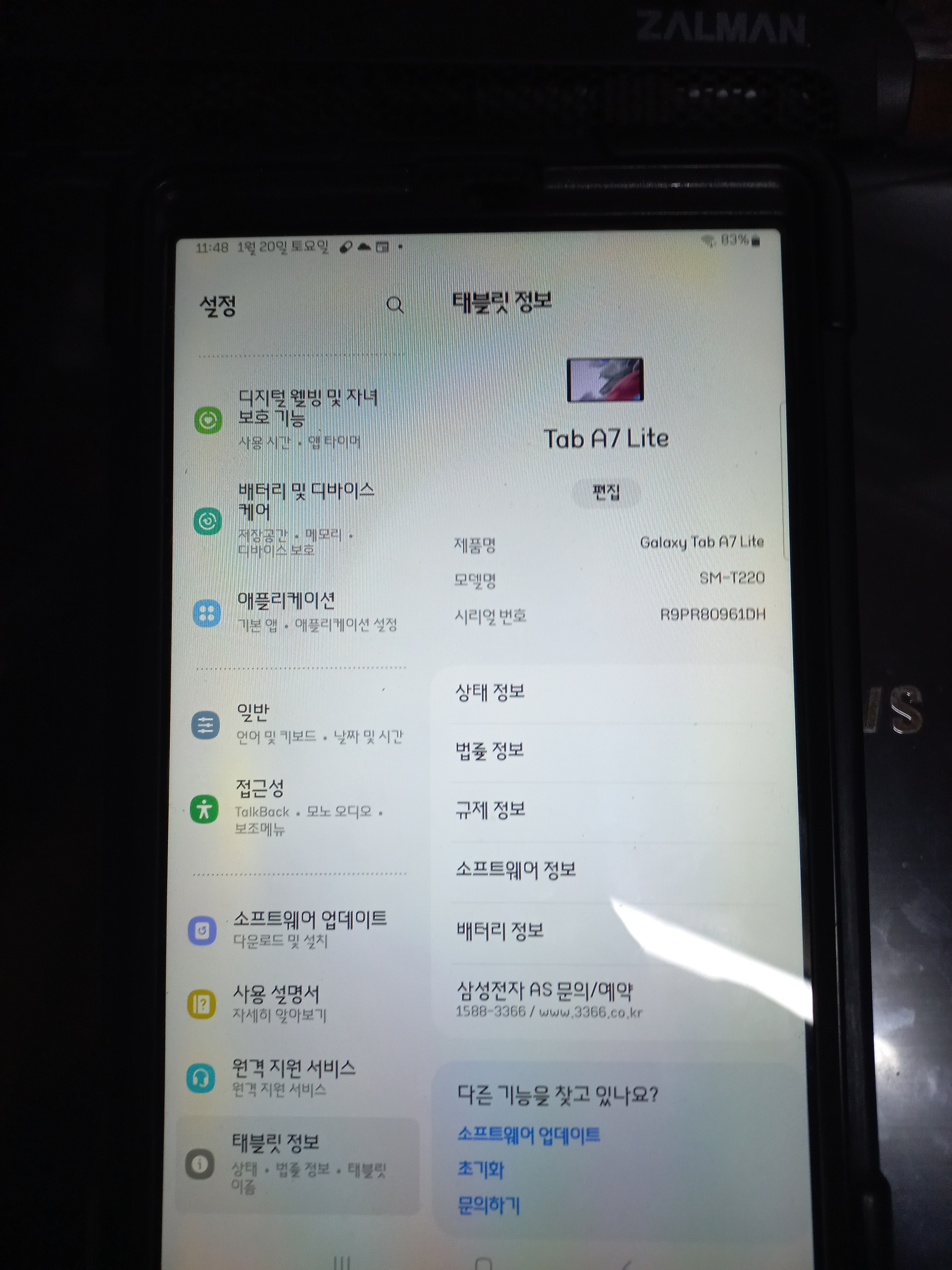
- Samsung Galaxy Tab A7 Lite
- Brand: Samsung
- Manufacturer: Samsung Electronics
- Type: Tablet computer
- Series: Galaxy Tab A
- Family: Samsung Galaxy
- First released: Tab A7 (2020): September 11, 2020; 5 years ago Tab A7 Lite: June 18, 2021; 5 years ago Tab A7 (2022): November 21, 2022; 3 years ago
- Discontinued: 2023; 3 years ago
- Predecessor: Samsung Galaxy Tab A 10.1; Samsung Galaxy Tab A 8.0
- Successor: Samsung Galaxy Tab A8; Samsung Galaxy Tab A9 (for Tab A7 Lite)
- Dimensions: 247.6 x 157.4 x 7 mm (9.75 x 6.20 x 0.28 in)
- Weight: Tab A7: 476 g (1.05 pounds); Tab A7 Lite: 366 g (12.91 oz)
- Operating system: Original: Tab A7 (2020): Android 10 with One UI Core 2.5 Tab A7 Lite: Android 11 with One UI Core 3.1 Tab A7 (2022): Android 12 with One UI Core 4.1.1; Current: Tab A7 (2020): Android 12 with One UI Core 4.1.1 Tab A7 Lite: Android 14 with One UI 6.1.1
- System-on-chip: Tab A7 (2020): Qualcomm Snapdragon 662; Tab A7 Lite: Mediatek Helio P22T; Tab A7 (2022): Unisoc T618
- Memory: 2 GB (for Tab A7 Lite only), 3 GB, or 4 GB
- Storage: 32 GB, 64 GB eMMC
- Removable storage: microSDXC
- Battery: Tab A7: 7040 mAh; Tab A7 Lite: 5100 mAh
- Charging: 15W Fast Charging
- Rear camera: 8 MP
- Front camera: Tab A7: 5 MP; Tab A7 Lite: 2 MP
- Display: Tab A7: TFT 10.4 in (26 cm) display Tab A7 Lite: TFT 8.7 in (22 cm) display
- Connectivity: Wi-Fi 802.11 a/b/g/n/ac Bluetooth 5.0; GPS

The Samsung Galaxy Tab A7 is a series of mid-range Android-based tablet computers manufactured, developed, designed, and marketed by Samsung Electronics. There were three devices released under the series: the base version (known as the Galaxy Tab A7 (2020); announced on September 2, 2020, and released on September 11, 2020), the low-end smaller version (known as the Galaxy Tab A7 Lite; announced on May 27, 2021, and released on June 18, 2021), and the refreshed variant of the base version (known as the Galaxy Tab A7 (2022); released on November 21, 2022).

== Specifications ==
=== Design ===
All of the three tablets have an aluminum frame and body, with the top part of the tablet's rear having a plastic covering. The front uses glass with an unspecified protection.

=== Hardware ===
==== Display ====
All three tablets have a TFT LCD, a 5:3 aspect ratio, and a 60Hz refresh rate. The only difference among the tablets are the resolution: the base variants have a WUXGA+ (2000×1200) resolution, while the Lite model has a WXGA+ (1340×800) resolution.

==== Battery ====
The base models have a 7,040 mAh battery capacity, while the Lite model has a 5,100 mAh battery capacity. Both models support 15W Fast Charging.

==== Processor and Memory ====
The base model uses the octa-core Qualcomm Snapdragon 662, while the refreshed version of the base model uses the Unisoc T618. The Lite model, meanwhile, uses the Mediatek Helio P22T chipset.

The base models are sold in either 3 or 4 GB of RAM, while storage variants are either in 32 GB or 64 GB. The Lite version offers the same internal storage options as the base models, along with 2 GB, 3 GB, or 4 GB RAM options. Regardless of the model, the internal storage uses eMMC 5.1 and has support for expandable storage via microSD.

==== Cameras ====
All models have a 8 MP rear camera, while the front camera either have a 5 MP (for the base models) or 2 MP (for the Lite model).

=== Software ===
The base version have Android 10 (One UI Core 2.5) pre-installed, while the Lite version have Android 11 (One UI Core 3.1) pre-installed. The refreshed version of the base model, meanwhile, have Android 12 (One UI Core 4.1) pre-installed. The original base variant only had support for two OS upgrades and four years of security updates, while the Lite version had support for three OS upgrades and four years of security updates. For unknown reasons, the refreshed variant of the base model didn't receive any major OS upgrades, but had the same end of support date as with the original base variant.

	Pre-installed OS	OS Upgrades history			End of support
	Pre-installed OS	1st	2nd	3rd	End of support
Tab A7 (2020)	Android 10 (One UI Core 2.5)	Android 11 (One UI Core 3.1); April 2021	Android 12 (One UI Core 4.1); June 2022	—N/a	August 2024
Tab A7 Lite	Android 11 (One UI Core 3.1)	Android 12 (One UI Core 4.1); August 2022	Android 13 (One UI Core 5.0); December 2022	Android 14 (One UI 6.0); January 2024	June 2025
Tab A7 (2022)	Android 12 (One UI Core 4.1)	—N/a			August 2024
