= Vainglory (video game) =

Multiplayer online battle arena video game

- Developer: Super Evil Megacorp
- Publisher: Super Evil Megacorp
- Platforms: iOS, Android, Microsoft Windows, ChromeOS, macOS
- Release: iOS; November 16, 2014; Android; July 2, 2015; Windows, macOS; July 29, 2018 (Alpha); February 13, 2019 (Full)
- Genre: MOBA

Vainglory is a free-to-play multiplayer online battle arena (MOBA) video game, developed and published by Super Evil Megacorp for iOS, Android and PC. As many games in its genre, Vainglory's gameplay focuses on player versus player battles, with players split into two teams of three or five with the ultimate goal of destroying the opposing team's base. The game was released for iOS on November 16, 2014, after being soft-launched for over half a year, with the Android version being released on July 2, 2015. A Mac and Microsoft Windows version of the game was released in July 2018. Through cross-platform play, players on all four platforms can play together simultaneously.

The game's development started in 2012 upon the forming of Super Evil Megacorp. The game was unveiled at Apple's September 2014 iPhone 6 announcement event to demonstrate the platform's Metal graphics API. Super Evil Megacorp attempted to make a game that would entertain players for hours and encourage in-person multiplayer experiences similar to that of a LAN party.

Vainglory received generally favorable reviews. Critics praised the game's graphics, characters, and level design, but criticized its lack of team communication features. Reviewers disagreed on the game's degree of accessibility to newcomers.

== Gameplay ==
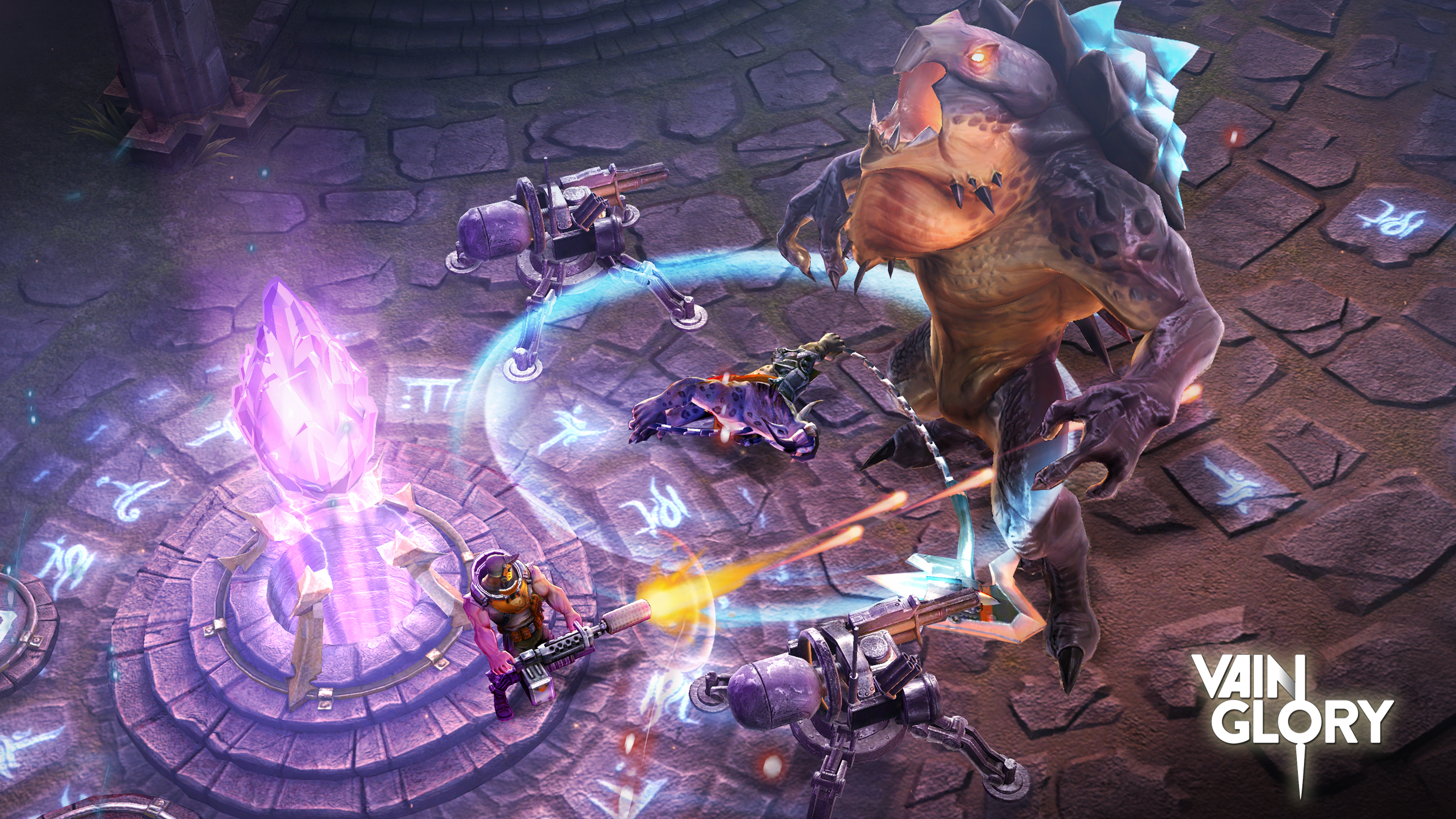
Defending a base from a kraken attack

Vainglory is a multiplayer online battle arena (MOBA) game similar to popular MOBAs like League of Legends and Dota 2 designed for smartphones, tablets and PC. A standard for the genre, two opposing teams fight to reach and destroy the enemy's base while defending their own in a tug of war for control over three paths, the "lanes", which connect the bases. In addition, there are "jungles” between the lanes, which contain creatures and objectives that can be killed or captured.

In Vainglory, teams have five players who each control an avatar, known as a "hero", from their own device. Weaker computer-controlled characters, called "minions", spawn at team bases and follow the lanes to the opposite team's base, fighting enemies and turrets en route. Lining the lanes are turret towers that repel the flow of minions and enemy heroes. The player's objective is to destroy the enemy turrets and ultimately the "Vain crystal" in the enemy team's base.

As of Update 3.9, mastery points on heroes can be earned by playing matches with them. These mastery points unlock stars once certain thresholds are reached. When a match starts, players can see each other's hero mastery in the loading screen. All matches give points as rewards, but Standard 3v3 and 5v5 give bonus points. The same number of points are rewarded regardless of a win or loss.

In Ranked mode, players are matched by a ranking system. Commonly referred to as Elo/ELO, the rank points earned from match wins will go up, and so as players improve, so too will the skill of opponents. Elo is named after Arpad Elo, the mathematician and chess grand master who invented the rank score system that is at the heart of rank scores in Vainglory.

Vainglory started with seven heroes, and has since expanded the roster to 56 heroes as of Update 4.11. The developers of the game continually add new heroes, each with different skills but balanced for fair play. For example, a hero may have high damage but poor mobility, or strong melee abilities but no ranged option. Players choose between three abilities that upgrade via a common technology tree. There is a set number of heroes that are free to play, with the free to play roster being renewed every week.

The game uses two main in-game currencies for in-app purchases: Glory can be earned through normal play and completing missions, and ICE (Immensely Concentrated Evil) can be purchased with real-world money. ICE can also sometimes be earned through game interactions, but it is a much less common reward. Players can unlock additional heroes for a certain amount of Glory. Skins, which change the appearance of heroes, can be unlocked with ICE or by collecting blueprints from the Market or in-game quests. Crafting a skin via a blueprint also requires Essence, obtainable through reward chests or acquiring a blueprint for a skin that a player already owns. Special Edition skins may only be unlocked through Opals, obtainable through reward chests or frequent in-app purchase bundle packs. Update 1.18.0 introduced "chests," which provide another way of obtaining any of these currencies; chests become available after completing a certain action (e.g. win 5 games).

Vainglory offers five main modes of in-game communication: team emoticons, strategic pings, static chat lines, party voicechat, and in-game chat (introduced on Update 2.6, 3.6, and 3.10, respectively).

Update 2.5 introduced Talents, collectible hero upgrades exclusively for BRAWL game modes (Blitz and Battle Royale). There are (as of February 6, 2020) 168 different talents, as each hero is released with 3 different tiers of talents: rare, epic and legendary, which can all be upgraded through the games standard in-game currency Glory. Talents can be upgraded many times depending on their tier. Rare talents can be upgraded 20 times, while Epic Talents are upgradeable 10 times and Legendary 5 times.

Update 3.4 introduced joystick control.

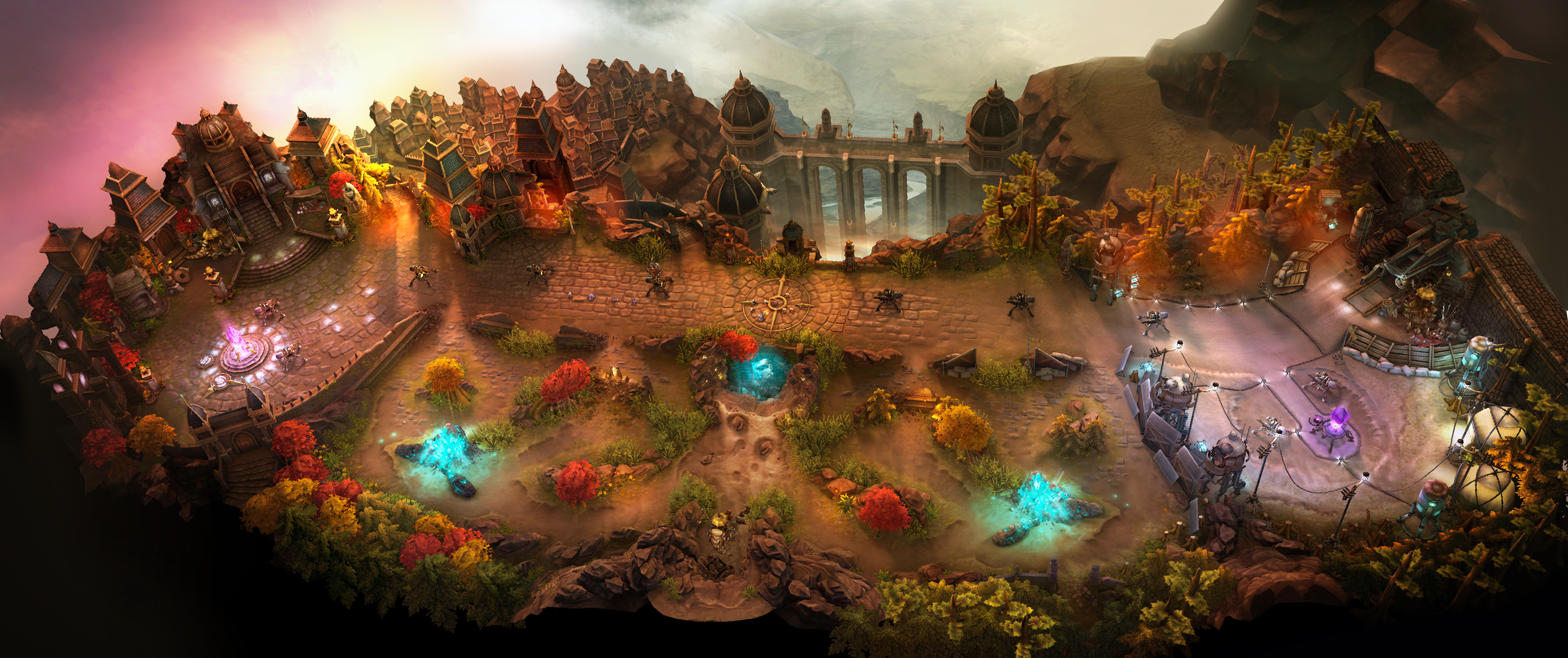
Vainglory's Halcyon Fold map, with team bases on both ends, the lane connecting the two on top, and the jungle underbrush beneath the lane

== Development ==
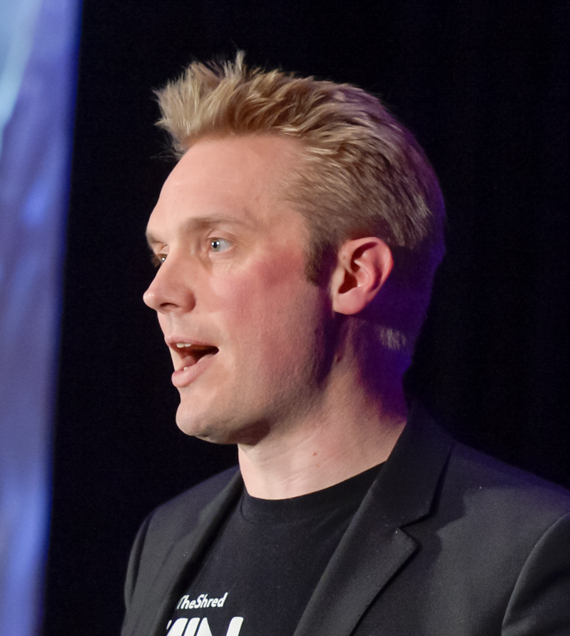
Segerstrale presents on Vainglory at the 2016 Game Developers Conference.

In February 2012, game developer veterans from Rockstar, Riot, Blizzard, and Insomniac founded Super Evil Megacorp in San Mateo, California to make a multiplayer online battle arena (MOBA) game for tablet devices, and thus began development on their first game, Vainglory. Apple chose the game to demonstrate the graphics capabilities of their iPhone 6 and Metal graphics API at the iPhone 6's announcement event. The game was soft-launched for six months prior to this September 2014 event, and was released on November 16, 2014.

Kristian Segerstrale, the founder of Playfish and former head of EA Digital, joined Super Evil Megacorp as its COO. Segerstrale expected Vainglory to popularize the MOBA genre like "Halo did for first-person shooters". Segerstrale stated that he hoped Vainglory would become something players "will organize their lives around" rather than something to pass spare time. The game is designed for tablets, which the company felt was the most fitting platform despite its lack of "core games" (games that rewarded "teamwork and strategy" over thousands of hours of play). They told Polygon that tablets were "inherently social", "less alienating to new players", and "possibly the best space for multiplayer play". Super Evil Megacorp CBO Bo Daly said he saw PC MOBA games as solitary experiences and thought tablets could make the experience better for groups as a reinvention of the LAN party, where players share a common gaming experience in the same shared physical space on separate devices. The company also intended for the game to become an esport. European esports tournament organizer Electronic Sports League announced the Vainglory Cup, a set of Vainglory competitions, to take place in June 2015 and elevated their partnership with ESL in Summer 2017 for organizing Vainglory 8 NA and EU.

On March 5, 2015, at the Game Developers Conference 2015, Super Evil Megacorp announced that Vainglory would be getting an Android version. After undergoing a closed beta, the game was fully released on July 2, 2015, on the Google Play Store.

Vainglory's artwork was produced by a team directed by Carlo "Chainsaw" Arellano. Players are also invited to guide the development of Vainglory by interacting with the developers through live streams on Twitch.

Update 2.8 (September 2017) added Keyboard and Mouse support in addition to Samsung's partnership with SEMC for Samsung DeX, a docking station for Samsung S8/S8+/Note 8 to connect listed device to a PC.

Super Evil Megacorp announced in early 2017 that a 5V5 mode was under development. The mode was released on February 13, 2018.

A desktop version was released on Steam for PC and Mac users on February 13, 2019. It has mappable keys and similar mechanics to other desktop MOBA games like League of Legends. Players using the PC and Mac client can compete in matches against mobile users as well as fellow desktop players, making it a cross-platform game. A spin-off game Vainglory All Stars was developed by Bazooka Tango in 2020.

On April 1, 2020, it was announced that Rogue Games (formerly both temporary publisher and developer of the game) would no longer continue development of Vainglory and intended to shut down the game. This caused NetEase (the publisher of Vainglory in China) to lose all faith in the project and determine to shut down the game in China as well. As a result, SEMC announced that Vainglory servers would be transferred to the community, removing expensive servers with player data and making the game "client authoritative". This means there will be no future centralized game updates as well as a reduction in services such as party play, the friends list, leaderboards, and in game chat. This also brings other opportunities such as community organized balance adjustments, community built and run APIs, and long term stability of servers.

However, as of March 6, 2023, the software for community servers has still been awaited by the dwindling community. Despite this, SEMC has continued to run servers, but with the lack of previously mentioned features. However, since the release of Catalyst Black on May 25, 2022, a sole developer, Loquori, has closely worked with the community to bring updates and patches. In January, the first potential patch list in almost 2 years (the latest version of Vainglory, 4.13 was released on March 14, 2020) was proposed by the community.

On April 30, 2020, Super Evil Megacorp revealed their next project after Vainglory, Catalyst Black — a new cross-platform battleground shooter.

== Reception ==
Reception

Aggregate score
Aggregator	Score
Metacritic	84/100

Review scores
Publication	Score
GamesTM	7/10
Gamezebo	80/100
IGN	8.1/10
Jeuxvideo.com	17/20
Pocket Gamer	3.5/5
TouchArcade	5/5
USgamer	4.5/5
Common Sense Media	4/5
National Post	8/10

The game received "favorable" reviews, according to video game review score aggregator website Metacritic. Reviewers praised the game's graphics, characters, and level design, but criticized its lack of team communication features. While IGN's Mitch Dyer wrote the game was accessible to newcomers, Matt Thrower of Pocket Gamer felt otherwise.

Thrower noted how the PC-based MOBA genre has had issues adapting its precise controls to the mobile platform, but that Vainglory trimmed features in the right areas. Dyer wrote that the game was its own "scaled down, rather than scaled back" version of the MOBA genre, and not an attempt to "approximate" League of Legends and Dota 2 experiences for mobile devices. Dyer praised the game's character and map detail, and wrote that all ten of the heroes had "fun" designs and were enjoyable to play. Thrower felt similarly about its graphics as most reviewers did. Dyer praised the iPad controls, but felt "cramped" on the iPhone 6 Plus. TouchArcade's Eric Ford described the controls as "flawless" and felt that the game's tutorial was among the best he had seen in iOS MOBAs. He added that he considered the game's in-app purchases "very fair" and not "pay-to-win".

Dyer reported his games to be about 21 minutes in length and noticed that they tended to snowball out of balance by the time the Kraken creature appears at the 15-minute mark. Dyer added that the advantages of in-person team communication made games feel "lopsided". Thrower wrote that the game's "depth" was in learning how to use the individual characters, and that beginners were subject to an "impenetrable learning curve", especially without organized teams. Ford said his only issue was with players leaving their play session while the game was still in action, but felt this was mitigated by the game's "Karma" matchmaking system. Ford otherwise reported that Vainglory played well as a whole as "probably the best MOBA on iOS".

The Guardian named Vainglory the "best" iOS game of 2014. The game was one of ten Apple Design Award recipients in 2015.
