= Samsung Wave S8500 =

Samsung smartphones

Samsung Wave GT-S8500

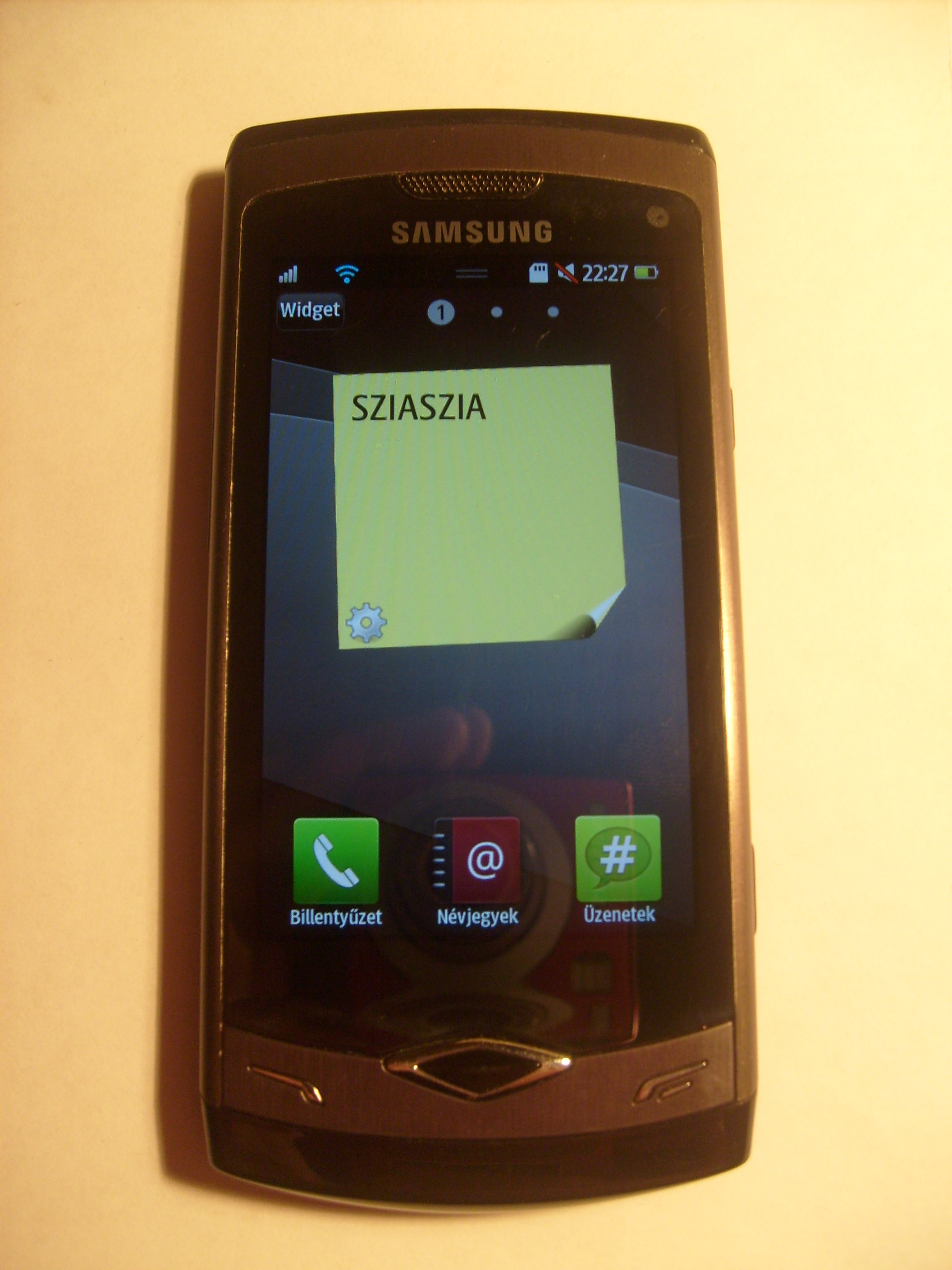
- Samsung Wave GT-S8500
- Manufacturer: Samsung Electronics
- Series: S-Series
- Availability by region: June 2010
- Successor: Samsung Wave II GT-S8530
- Related: Samsung Galaxy S, Samsung Wave II S8530, Samsung Wave Y, Samsung Wave 575
- Compatible networks: GSM: 850/900/1800/1900/2100; 3G: 900/2100; 3G: 850/1900 (NAM Version); HSDPA: 3.6 Mbps
- Form factor: Slate
- Dimensions: 118×56×10.9 mm (4.65×2.20×0.43 in) (72.0272 cm³)
- Weight: 118 g
- Operating system: bada with TouchWiz 3.0
- CPU: ARM Cortex A8 clocked at 1 GHz (Samsung S5PC110)
- GPU: PowerVR SGX 540
- Memory: 256 MB RAM
- Storage: 1 GB / 2 GB / 8 GB
- Removable storage: microSD(HC) up to 32 GB
- Battery: Li-Ion 1500 mAh
- Rear camera: 5 MP with autofocus, LED flash, geo-tagging, face detection
- Front camera: 720p (HD) at 30 fps, slow motion, video light
- Display: 3.3" Capacitive touchscreen, 800x480 @ 283 PPI (0.38 Megapixels), Super AMOLED, (PenTile Matrix) display with Gorilla Glass
- Media: MP3, AAC, AAC+, e-AAC+, WMA, AMR, WAV, MP4, MPEG4, H.263, H.264, WMV, DivX, XviD, MKV, (FLAC bada 1.2), OpenGL ES 2.0
- Connectivity: 802.11b/g/n Wi-Fi, A-GPS, Bluetooth 3.0, microUSB
- Data inputs: T9 trace (bada 1.2), Abc, QWERTY, Multi-touch input method, Handwriting recognition
- Other: Scratch-resistant surface (Corning Gorilla Glass); Smart unlock; Accelerometer; Proximity Sensor; Magnetometer; Digital compass

The Samsung Wave (model number GT-S8500) is a smartphone developed and produced by Samsung Electronics. It is the first Samsung smartphone to run the Bada operating system, which was announced on February 14, 2010 during Samsung's Galaxy Unpacked event at the MWC Barcelona, and subsequently released on May 24, 2010. The Wave is a touchscreen phone powered by Samsung's "Hummingbird" CPU (S5PC110), which includes a 1 GHz ARM Cortex-A8 CPU and a built-in PowerVR SGX 540 graphics engine. It also has a "Super AMOLED" screen and 720p high-definition video capture capabilities. With the release of Bada 1.2, Samsung also released a successor to the device called Wave II featuring a PLS display and immediately ceased production of the original S8500 model due to shortage of AMOLED screens.

== Specifications ==
=== Screen ===
The screen is a 3.3-inch (84 mm) capacitive touchscreen Super AMOLED with an anti-smudge oleophobic coating on top of the scratch-resistant tempered-glass ( Gorilla Glass Display ). The screen resolution is 800x480 WVGA with 283 PPI.

=== Processor ===
The phone features a 1 GHz SoC, which internally contains an ARM Cortex A8 CPU core, the same model as Apple's A4 processor. The graphics engine of the device is a PowerVR SGX 540 GPU which is said to be capable of generating 90 million triangles per second (same as the SoC used on the Samsung Galaxy S).

=== Camera ===
The phone features a 5 megapixel EDOF camera which supports 2560 × 1920 pixels, along with autofocus, LED flash, Geo-tagging, face and blink detection, image stabilization, touch focus, etc. Shooting modes include beauty shot, smile shot, continuous, panorama and vintage shot. As a camcorder it is able to shoot HD recording (1280×720) at 30 FPS with flash.

=== Operating system ===
The Wave was the first phone with Samsung's own Linux based operating system, Bada, meaning "Ocean" in Korean. Samsung worked on the later versions of Bada 1.2 and later 2.0. Bada 1.2 was released to the world in a phased manner as it was designed to improve stability.

In January 2012, Samsung declared that it was planning to merge Bada with the Linux-based Tizen operating system that was developed in collaboration with Intel. Despite the collaboration, it was not supported by the wave.

Unofficial ports of Android were made due to the restrictions and the eventual cease in development of Bada. Versions ported include Android Froyo, Gingerbread, Ice Cream Sandwich, Jellybean, KitKat, Lollipop and Marshmallow.

=== Other features ===
Other features include A-GPS, 2 GB/8 GB of internal storage with a microSDHC slot for an additional 32 GB. It also has a magnetometer (compass), a proximity sensor, an accelerometer, 5.1-channel surround sound Mobile Theater, music recognition, a fake call service, smart search, Social Hub and it is the first phone to support Bluetooth version 3.0.

Radio connectivity includes Bluetooth 3.0, Wi-Fi 802.11 b/g/n and HSDPA 3.6 Mbit/s.

This phone is available with both European/Asian 3G bandings and the North American 3G bands. The North American 3G bands version of the phone is a limited availability and is not available in the US.

== Software features ==
=== User interface ===
The phone is the first smartphone to feature the Samsung Bada operating system platform. The UI is Samsung's own TouchWiz 3.0. TouchWiz 3.0, like the two predecessors (TouchWiz 2.0 and TouchWiz), utilizes widgets. The three most notable widgets pre-installed in TouchWiz 3.0 are Daily Briefing (which includes all essential information such as weather, finance, AP mobile news and schedule), Feeds and Updates and Buddies now (which allows users to call, send texts to and read Facebook/Twitter feeds off their favorite contacts). Users are allowed to have up to 10 home screens to add widgets.

=== Applications ===
For Internet browsing the Samsung Wave has the Dolphin Browser v2.0 (based on WebKit) (or 3.0 depends by the firmware version). This browser supports Flash, but it is disabled by default to improve page loading speed.

By default, the phone comes with Picsel Viewer which is capable of reading .PDF and Microsoft Office file formats. Users from selected countries can buy and download Picsel Office Editor from Samsung Apps.

As for Samsung Apps, users can also download applications, games and widgets from the application store.

Other software includes the GPS software that comes with this phone (LBS Route 66), Facebook, Twitter, social hub, mini diary, daily briefing, memo, video player, FM radio, media browser, voice recorder, e-mail and pre-installed Asphalt 5.

=== Media support ===
The Samsung Wave supports MP3, AAC, AAC+, e-AAC+, WMA, AMR, WAV, MP4, MPEG4, H.263, H.264, WMV, FLV, DivX, XviD, MKV and FLAC file formats. It also supports subtitles.

=== Bada 2.0 support ===
In many countries at the end of December 2011, the operating system was gradually updated to Bada 2.0. The first official Bada 2.0 version was LA1.

With Bada 2.0, the TouchWiz UI reached version 4.0, the GUI was completely redone, and included many new features, such as full multitasking, WAC, voice commands, text-to-speech, speech-to-text, ChatON, Caster, a new version of DLNA, social apps and the Dolphin 3.0 browser with a download manager.

Android porting

Due to many owners of the phone disliking the Bada software many people have worked on porting the popular Android OS to the Wave. The ported versions known are Froyo, Gingerbread, Ice Cream Sandwich, Jelly Bean and KitKat. However they are still being developed and some features, such as GPS, may be limited or not function as intended.

== See also ==
- Exynos - Samsung
- Amoled - Samsung
