= Samsung Wave 3 S8600 =

Smartphone model

Samsung S8600 Wave 3
- Manufacturer: Samsung Electronics
- Series: S-Series
- Availability by region: October 2011
- Predecessor: Samsung Wave II S8530
- Related: Samsung Jet, Samsung Galaxy S, Samsung Wave S8500, Samsung Wave Y
- Compatible networks: GSM: 850/900/1800/1900/2100; 3G: 900/2100; HSDPA: 3.6 Mbit/s; HSUPA: 2 Mbit/s
- Form factor: Slate
- Dimensions: 123.9×59.8×11.8 mm (4.88×2.35×0.46 in)
- Weight: 122 g
- Operating system: bada 2.0 with TouchWiz 3.0
- CPU: ARM Cortex A8 clocked at 1.4 GHz (Scorpion)
- Memory: 512MB of RAM
- Storage: 4GB
- Removable storage: microSD(HC) up to 32 GB
- Battery: Li-Ion 1500 mAh
- Rear camera: 5 MP (4:3)
- Display: 4.0" 800x480 @ 283 PPI Super AMOLED display with Gorilla Glass
- Media: MP3, AAC, AAC+, e-AAC+, WMA, AMR, WAV, MP4, FLAC, MPEG4, H.263, H.264, WMV, DivX, XviD, MKV ...?
- Connectivity: 802.11b/g/n Wi-Fi, A-GPS, Bluetooth 3.0, microUSB 2.0
- Data inputs: T9 trace, Abc, QWERTY, Multi-touch input method, Handwriting recognition
- Other: Scratch-resistant surface; Smart unlock; Accelerometer; Proximity Sensor; Magnetometer; Digital compass

The Samsung Wave 3 S8600 (or "Samsung Wave 3") is a smartphone running the Bada 2.0 operating system designed by Samsung, which was commercially released in August 2011. The Wave is a slim touchscreen phone powered by "Scorpion" CPU, which includes 1.4 GHz ARM Cortex-8 CPU and a powerful graphics engine, "Super LCD" screen and 720p high-definition video capture capabilities. Shortage of Super AMOLED screens was one of the primary reasons for the release of this model.

== Hardware features ==
=== Design ===
The phone is made of mostly metal alloy and is measured at 12.9 mm thick. In terms of form factor, it is a slate style featuring 3 physical buttons on the front: call, reject/ shutdown, and main menu button.

=== Screen ===
The screen is a 4.0-inch (100 mm) capacitive touchscreen Super LCD with an anti-smudge oleophobic coating on top of the scratch-resistant tempered-glass (Gorilla Glass Display) touch panel which has been shown to be capable of resisting extreme friction (scratch-resistant). The screen resolution is 800x480 WVGA and an area of 45.5 cm^2 (~233 ppi).

=== Processor ===
The phone features a Scorpion processor Qualcomm S2 MSM8255T 1.4 GHz SoC, which internally contains an ARM Cortex A8 CPU core.

=== Camera ===
The phone features a 5 megapixel which supports 2592 × 1944 pixels, along with autofocus, LED flash, Geo-tagging, face, blink detection, image stabilization, touch focus, etc. Other than these features it has various shooting modes such as beauty shot, smile shot, continuous, panorama and vintage shot. As a camcorder it is able to shoot 720p HD recording (1280x720) at 30 FPS with flash.

=== Other features ===
Other feature include A-GPS, 2 GB/8 GB of internal storage with a microSDHC slot for an additional 32 GB. It also has a magnetometer, a proximity sensor, an accelerometer, 5.1-channel surround sound Mobile Theater, music recognition, a fake call service, smart search, Social Hub and it is the first phone to support Bluetooth version 3.0.

In addition to Bluetooth 3.0, the phone also features Wi-Fi 802.11 b/g/n, HSDPA 3.2 Mbit/s and HSUPA 2 Mbit/s.

This phone is available with both European/Asia 3G bandings and the North American 3G bandings.

== Software features ==
=== User interface ===
The phone is one of the few smartphones to feature the Samsung bada 2.0 operating system platform.

=== Applications ===
By default, the phone comes with Picsel Viewer which is capable of reading. pdf and Microsoft Office file formats.

As for Samsung apps, users can also download applications, games and widgets from the application store.

=== Media support ===
- Audio
  - MP3, AAC, AAC+, e-AAC+, WMA, AMR, WAV, MP4, FLAC
- Video
  - MPEG4, H.263, H.264, WMV, AVI, DivX, XviD, MKV

=== Android porting ===
Android Custom ROMs up to Android 4.4

== See also ==
- Exynos
- AMOLED
- Samsung Wave Y
