= Samsung Galaxy Tab A8 =

Budget Samsung tablet

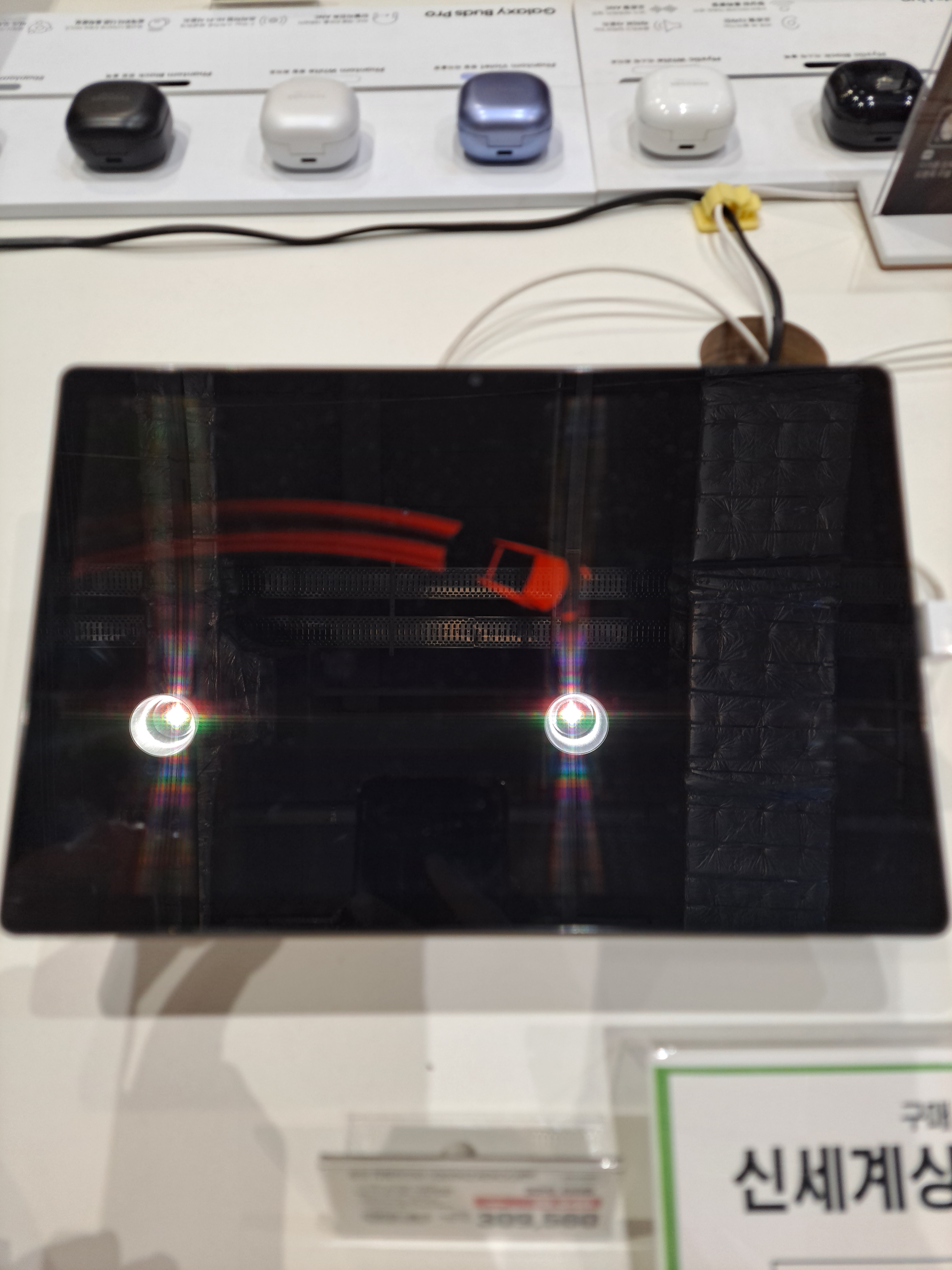
- Samsung Galaxy Tab A8
- Also known as: Samsung Galaxy Tab A8: SM-X200 and SM-X205
- Manufacturer: Samsung Electronics
- Product family: Galaxy Tab A
- Type: Tablet computer
- Generation: 8th generation
- Released: January 17, 2022
- Operating system: Original: Android 11 with One UI 3.1 (Note: Some newer models ship with Android 12 and One UI 4.); Current: Android 14 with One UI 6.1 (Note: Some newer models are upgraded to Android 15 and One UI 7.)
- System on a chip: Unisoc Tiger T618 (12 nm)
- CPU: Octa-core (2x2.0 GHz Cortex-A75 & 6x1.8 GHz Cortex-A55)
- Memory: 3 GB and 4 GB RAM
- Storage: 32GB, 64GB, 128GB
- Removable storage: microSDXC
- Display: TFT 10.5 in (27 cm) display
- Graphics: Mali G52 MP2
- Sound: Stereo speakers, with 3.5 mm jack
- Input: Touchscreen
- Camera: Rear: 8 MP; Front: 5 MP
- Connectivity: Wi-Fi 802.11 a/b/g/n/ac; Bluetooth 5.0; GPS; USB-C
- Power: 7040 mAh battery
- Platform: Android OS
- Dimensions: 246.8 x 161.9 x 6.9 mm (9.72 x 6.37 x 0.27 in)
- Weight: 508g (1.12 lb)
- Predecessor: Samsung Galaxy Tab A7; Samsung Galaxy Tab A7 Lite
- Successor: Samsung Galaxy Tab A9+

The Samsung Galaxy Tab A8 is a budget Android tablet computer and part of the Samsung Galaxy Tab series designed by Samsung Electronics.

== History ==
The Galaxy Tab A8 was announced on December 15, 2021 and was released on January 17, 2022. It is the successor to the Samsung Galaxy Tab A7 and A7 Lite.

== Features ==
The Galaxy Tab A8 shipped with Android 11 and upgradable to Android 14 (One UI 6.1) and has access to apps from Google Play Store and Google apps as well as the Galaxy Store and Samsung apps.

The Galaxy Tab A8 is available in WiFi-only and LTE editions. Storage ranges from 32 GB to 64 GB and up to 128 GB. The 32 GB models have 3 GB of RAM while the other models have 4 GB. A microSD slot is included which supports sizes up to 1 TB. It comes in three colors - graphite, silver, and pink-gold. The screen is 10.5 inches with a resolution of 1920 × 1200 and has a ratio of 16:10. The tablet has a 5 MP front camera and an 8 MP rear camera, a headphone jack, Bluetooth support, USB-C charging, and four speakers.

Also the Samsung Galaxy Tab A8 uses a 2D face unlock system.

The Tab A8 does not support a stylus, NFC, or fingerprints.
