= Bada (operating system) =

Discontinued mobile operating system

- Bada 2.0 home screen
- Developer: Samsung Electronics
- Written in: C++
- OS family: TRON, Linux
- Working state: Discontinued (replaced by Tizen)
- Source model: Mixed: proprietary and open source components
- Final release: 2.0.6 SDK / 28 February 2013; 13 years ago
- Marketing target: Smartphone
- Available in: Multilingual
- Package manager: Samsung Kies
- Kernel type: Microkernel (Nucleus RTOS) or Linux kernel
- Default user interface: TouchWiz, graphical (touchscreen)
- License: Proprietary
- Official website: www.bada.com

- Bada
- Hangul: 바다
- RR: Bada
- MR: Pada

Bada (stylized as bada; Korean: 바다) is a discontinued mobile operating system developed by Samsung Electronics for devices such as mid- to high-end smartphones and tablet computers. The name is derived from "바다 (bada)", meaning "ocean" or "sea" in Korean. All phones running Bada were branded with the name Wave, unlike Samsung's Android devices which are branded as Galaxy.

Bada is based on Mentor Graphics' Nucleus RTOS kernel or Linux kernel, and was planned to become as middleware separated from an OS kernel, but development was discontinued. To foster adoption of Bada, Samsung reportedly considered releasing the source code under an open-source license, and expanding device support to include Smart TVs.

In June 2012 Samsung announced its intention to merge Bada into the Tizen project, while still using it in parallel with Google's Android OS and Microsoft's Windows Phone on its smartphones. On 25 February 2013, Samsung announced that it would stop developing Bada, moving development to Tizen instead. Bug reporting was terminated in April 2014.

== History ==
Bada and the mobile software distributions to which it is related

After the announcement of Bada, the Wave S8500 would eventually be the first Bada-based phone, and was shown to the public at Mobile World Congress 2010 in Barcelona in February 2010. Alongside Bada itself, some applications running on Bada were exhibited, including mobile videogames like Gameloft's Asphalt 5. The Wave S8500 was released in May that year, and sold one million handsets over the first four weeks on the market.

According to Samsung, companies such as Twitter, EA, Capcom, Gameloft and Blockbuster revealed their support for the Bada platform by having arranged development partnerships with Samsung since before the launch, and shared a few insights about their vision for the future of mobile apps and how Bada would play a role in it. These were a showcase of what could be heard in a series of events held across the world during the year 2010, called Developer Days. In addition, it was made public the announcement of an incoming Bada Developer Challenge with a total prize of $2,700,000 (USD) throughout the launch event. In May 2010, Samsung released a beta of their Bada software development kit (SDK), making it available to the general public as it had done with partners the previous December, to entice potential developers of applications for this platform. In August 2010, Samsung released version 1.0 of the Bada SDK. A year later, in August 2011, version 2.0 of the Bada SDK was released.

== Versions ==
The Samsung S8500 Wave was launched with version 1.0 of the Bada operating system. Samsung soon released version 1.0.2, which included minor fixes for European users. Version 1.2 was released with the Samsung S8530 Wave II phone. The alpha-version of Bada 2.0 was introduced on 15 February 2011, with the Samsung S8530 Wave II handset.

The final flagship Bada handset was the Samsung Wave III S8600, running Bada 2.0.

=== Bada 2.0 ===
The Bada 2.0 version was shown at IFA 2011 in Berlin and was released in the end of December 2011 with a lot of new functions and improvements compared to version 1.2, introducing features such as:

- Full HTML5 support
- WAC 2.0 compatibility
- Full multitasking
- WiFi-Direct technology
- Adobe Flash Lite 4 (mobile Flash Player version, supports ActionScript 3.0 of Adobe Flash 10 and 11)
- Dolphin Browser 3.0 with download manager
- Smart-wallpapers
- Text-to-speech
- Voice recognition
- Vocal commands based on Vlingo
- Push notifications
- NFC (near-field communication technology)
- New security policies and protection functions
- New camera manager
- New GUI
- OpenAL
- Inclusion of new proprietary applications and services such as ChatON (instant messaging software), Caster (to share multimedia content and web pages with PC) and Music Hub (a music store similar to iTunes)

== Samsung Apps ==
With the release of the Samsung Wave, Samsung opened an international application store, Samsung Apps, for the Bada platform. It had over 2,400 applications and was also available for Android and Samsung feature phones.

Samsung created a new app store for its subsequent mobile OS, Tizen.

== Architecture ==

Architecture of bada

The bada architecture consists of the following four layers:

- Kernel

This layer contains either the real-time operating system or the Linux kernel, depending on device hardware configuration.

- Device
- Service
- Framework

Bada was defined by Samsung as not an operating system itself but a platform with a kernel configurable architecture, which allowed using either a proprietary real-time operating system hybrid (RTOS) kernel or the Linux kernel. According to copyrights displayed by Samsung Wave S8500, it used code from FreeBSD, NetBSD and OpenBSD.

The device layer provided core functions such as graphics, protocols, telephony and security. The service layer provided more service-centric features such as SMS, mapping and in-app-purchasing, handled by a Bada Server. The top layer, the framework layer, provided an application programming interface (API) in C++ for application developers to use.

Bada provided various UI controls to developers, and a web browser control based on the open-source WebKit, and featured Adobe Flash, supporting Flash versions 9 to 11 (Flash Lite 4 with ActionScript 3.0 support) in Bada 2.0. Both of the latter could be embedded inside native Bada applications. It supported the OpenGL ES 2.0 3D graphics API and offered interactive mapping with point of interest (POI) features, which could also be embedded inside native applications. It supported pinch-to-zoom, tabbed browsing and cut, copy, and paste features.

Bada's interaction methods that could be incorporated into applications included sensors such as motion sensing, vibration control, face detection, accelerometer, magnetometer, tilt, Global Positioning System (GPS), and multi-touch.

Native applications were developed in C++ with the Bada SDK, and the Eclipse based integrated development environment (IDE). GNU-based tool chains were used for building and debugging applications. The IDE also contained a drag and drop application for designing application interfaces, and an emulator for apps.

== Criticism of Bada 1.x ==
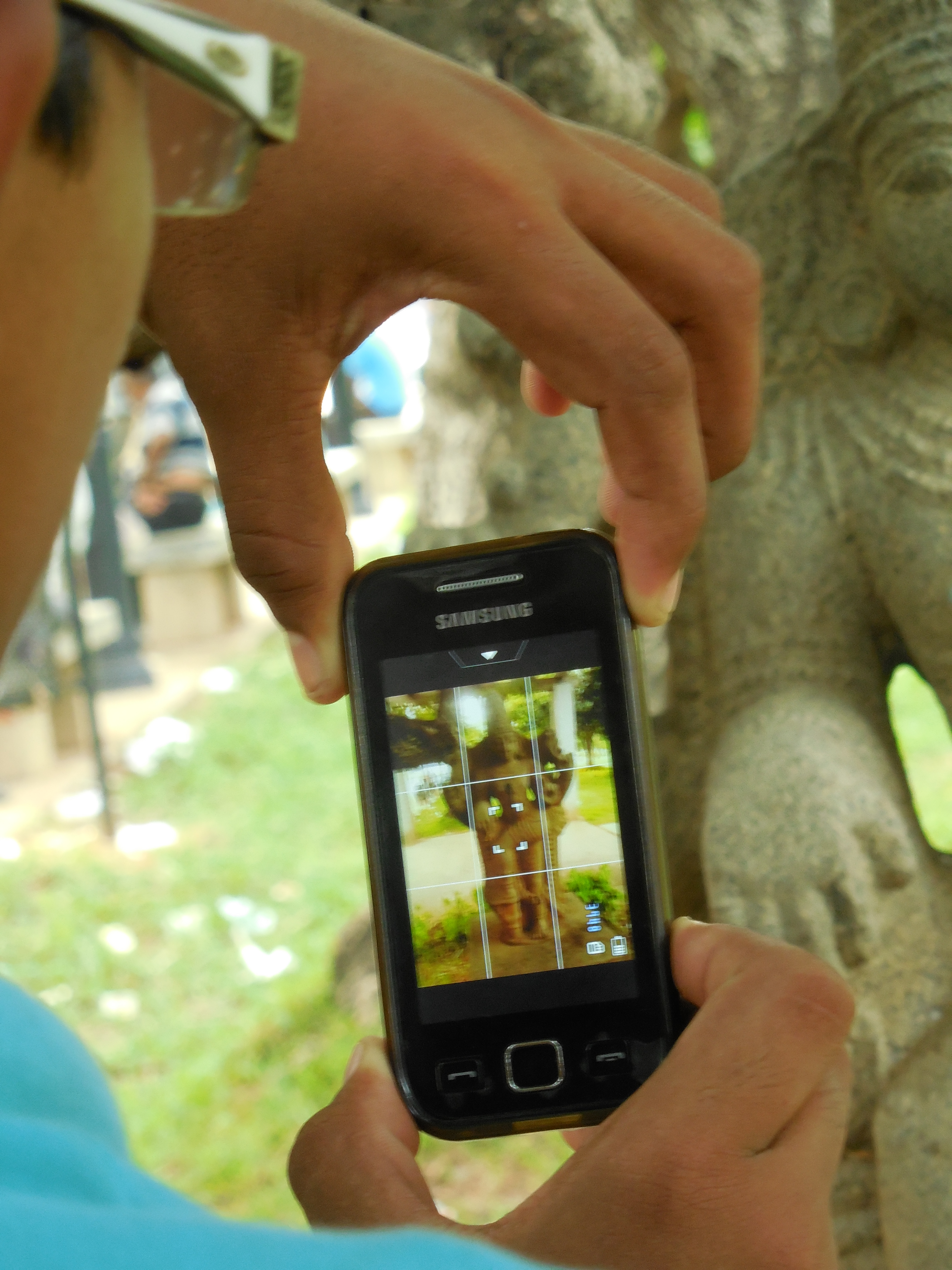
Picture being taken using the Samsung Wave 525 running on Bada 1.0

Some publications criticized Bada 1.x over the following issues:

- In the beginning, all VoIP over Wi-Fi applications were banned which meant that popular applications such as Skype could not be used. In March 2011 the restriction was removed.
- The external sensor API was not open-ended, preventing new types of sensors or unexpected technology developments from being added in the future by third parties.
- Due to "performance and privacy issues", Bada 1.x applications cannot access the SMS/MMS inbox or receive incoming SMS/MMS notifications. This limit was removed in version 2.0.
- Bada versions 1.x only allowed one Bada third party application to run at a time. Multitasking applications was only possible between the base applications and one Bada third party application. This limit is removed since version 2.0.
- The best GPS facility was poor in Bada 1.0. It was further updated in Bada 2.0.
- The lack of availability of popular applications was arguably one of the most important factors in the demise of Bada. The lack of developer and consumer support that caused this deficit could not be rectified by the Bada 2.0 update.

== Devices ==
=== Flagships ===
- Samsung S8500 (Wave) It is the first smartphone to run the Bada operating system version 1.0, released on May 24, 2010.
- Samsung S8530 (Wave II) It is the successor of the Samsung Wave S8500 Wave and runs on Bada 1.2, released in October 2010.
- Samsung S8600 (Wave III) It is the successor of the Samsung Wave S8530 Wave II and runs on Bada 2.0. It is the last flagship smartphone to run the Bada operating system, released in August 2011.

=== Midrange phones ===
released Bada OS 1.1 pre-installed, with continued support until Bada OS 2.0.

- Samsung S5250 (Wave 525)
- Samsung S5330 (Wave 533)
- Samsung S5750 (Wave 575)
- Samsung S5780 (Wave 578)
- Samsung S7230 (Wave 723)

released with Bada OS 2.0 pre-installed.

- Samsung S5380 (Wave Y), direct successor to Wave 525/533.
- Samsung S7250 (Wave M), direct successor to Wave 723 and it is the last midrange smartphone to run the Bada operating system.

== Market shares ==
The chart below show global sales of Bada smartphones from the second quarter of 2010 through the second quarter of 2013. Canalys, a technology market analysis company, estimated that Samsung shipped 3.5 million phones running Bada in Q1 of 2011. This rose to 4.5 million phones in Q2 of 2011.

According to Gartner, in Q1 2012 Bada gained a grow index of +43%, and rose to 2.7% market share (up from 1.9% in Q1 2011).

In South Korea, the fiscal year is the same as the calendar year.

Fiscal year and quarter	Percentage of global smartphone sales	Smartphones sold (millions)
Q2 2010	0.9	0.6
Q3 2010	1.1	0.9
Q4 2010	2.0	2.0
Q1 2011	1.9	1.9
Q2 2011	1.9	2.1
Q3 2011	2.2	2.5
Q4 2011	2.1	3.1
Q1 2012	2.7	3.8
Q2 2012	2.7	4.2
Q3 2012	3	5.2
Q4 2012	1.3	2.7
Q1 2013	0.7	1.37
Q2 2013	0.4	0.84

== See also ==
- Comparison of mobile operating systems
- Tizen
- Nucleus RTOS
