= Samsung Wave 575 =

Mobile phone

The Samsung Wave S575 (or "Samsung Wave S5750") which is the successor of Samsung Wave 525 is the smartphone running the ancient bada 1.1 Operating system designed by Samsung. Wave 575 was officially released by Samsung on 8 October 2010. The Wave has a slim multi-touch enabled display with 3G Internet connectivity available which is not available in its predecessor.

== Hardware features ==
=== Design ===
The dimensions are 4.31 in × 2.17 in × 0.47 in (109 mm × 55 mm × 12 mm) and it weighs 3.53 oz (100 g) It has an internal antenna and has a camera shutter key at the right and a Lock/Unlock key. It comes in Black, Pink and White colors.

=== Screen ===
The screen is a 3.2-inch capacitive multi-touch screen and TFT 256 Colors display with a resolution of 240×400 pixels.

=== Camera ===
The phone features a 3.2 MP camera which supports 2048 × 1536 pixels, along with geo-tagging. Shooting modes include single, smile shot, panorama. As a camcorder, it is able to shoot HD recording. Scene mode includes Night mode, landscape, sports, party/Indoor, Beach/show and distant scenery mode.

=== Memory ===
The phone features an inbuilt memory of 100 MB and can be expandable up to 32 GB. The memory card slot types are microSD, microSDHC.

=== Battery ===
The phone has a Li-ion battery which has a capacity for Li-Ion 1200 mAh, which lasts for 2 days without any musics playing and only messaging done.

=== Wireless ===
It is also available with Bluetooth 3.0, Wi-Fi (802.11b, 802.11g, 802.11n), it use Mini-SIM card and support HSPA 3.6/0.384 Mbit/s.

=== Software Features ===
This phone includes a Music Player which supports mp3 extensions along with Music Recognition. It includes a video playback supporting MPEG4, H.263, H.264, up to 720p. Also includes the Radio featuring recording options with streaming facility. It has an in-built browser "Dolfin 2.0" supporting HTML content with built-in online services support for Facebook and Twitter.

=== Other features ===
The phone houses location-based services enabling GPS systems. The phonebook for adding contacts features caller groups, multiple numbers per contact, search by both first and last name, Picture ID, Ring ID. Includes calendar, alarms and calculator. Includes instant SMS, MMS messaging supporting Predictive Text input and also supports E-Mail (IMAP, POP3, SMTP, Microsoft Exchange, Push e-mail). Notifications supports includes polyphonics ringtones, music ringtones, vibration alert enabled, flight mode, silent mode. This phone also includes voice recording. This phone also has a computer synchronisation and an OTA synchronisation.

This has a 3.5 mm headphones connector.

=== Media support ===
MP3, WMA, WAV, MP4, MPEG4, H.263, H.264, WMV, DivX, XviD, MKV
