= Samsung Galaxy Tab A11 =

2025 mid-range Android tablet computers by Samsung Electronics

Samsung Galaxy Tab A11 Samsung Galaxy Tab A11+

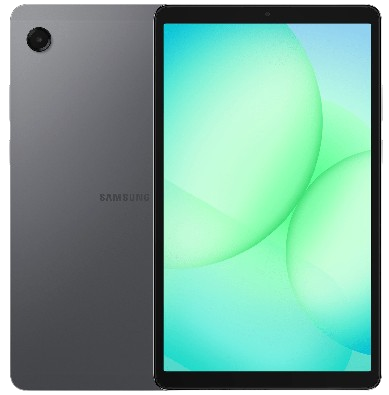
- Galaxy Tab A11 in Gray
- Brand: Samsung
- Manufacturer: Samsung Electronics
- Type: Tablet computer
- Series: Galaxy Tab A
- Family: Samsung Galaxy
- First released: September 15, 2025; 13 months ago
- Availability by region: Tab A11: September 15, 2025; 13 months ago Tab A11+ November 2, 2025; 12 months ago
- Predecessor: Samsung Galaxy Tab A9
- Compatible networks: GSM (2G) 850 / 900 / 1800 / 1900; HSDPA (3G) 850 / 900 / 1700(AWS) / 1900 / 2100; LTE (4G) 1, 2, 3, 4, 5, 7, 8, 12, 13 (Tab A11+ only),17, 20, 26, 28, 38, 40, 41, 66; 5G (Tab A11+ only) 1, 3, 5, 7, 8, 20, 26, 28, 38, 40, 41, 66, 71, 77, 78 SA/NSA/Sub6
- Colors: Gray and Silver
- Dimensions: Tab A11: 211 x 124.7 x 8 mm Tab A11+: 257.1 x 168.7 x 6.9 mm
- Operating system: Original: Tab A11: Android 15 (One UI 7.0); Tab A11+: Android 16 (One UI 8.0); Current: Android 16 (One UI 8.5)
- System-on-chip: Tab A11: MediaTek Helio G99 (6 nm); Tab A11+: MediaTek Dimensity 7300 (4 nm)
- CPU: Tab A11: 2x2.2 GHz Cortex-A76 & 6x2.0 GHz Cortex-A55; Tab A11+: 4x2.5 GHz Cortex-A78 & 4x2.0 GHz Cortex-A55
- GPU: Tab A11: Mali-G57 MC2; Tab A11+: Mali-G615 MC2
- Memory: Tab A11: 4/8GB RAM; Tab A11+: 6/8GB RAM
- Storage: 64/128/256 GB
- SIM: Nano-SIM + eSIM (cellular model only)
- Battery: Tab A11: Li-po 5100 mAh; Tab A11+: Li-po 7040 mAh
- Charging: Tab A11: 15W Type-C 2.0 wired charging Tab A11+: 25W Type-C 2.0 wired charging
- Rear camera: Single-Camera Setup; All: GalaxyCore GC08A8 or SmartSens SC820CS; 8 MP, f/2.0, 27mm, FoV 77.4°, 1/4.0", 1.12 µm, AF; Camera features: Panorama; Video recording: 1080p@30fps
- Front camera: All: GalaxyCore GC05A2 or SmartSens SC521CS; 5 MP, f/2.2, 28mm (wide), FoV 75.6°, 1/5.0", 1.12 µm, FF; Video recording: 1080p@30fps
- Data inputs: Accelerometer, gyro (Tab A11+ only), proximity, compass
- Website: Galaxy Tab A11

The Samsung Galaxy Tab A11 and A11+ are a lineup of two Android-based tablets manufactured, developed and marketed by Samsung Electronics. Both tablets were announced on September 15, 2025. In the same date, the Tab A11 was released, and later the Tab A11+ released on November 2, 2025. Both tablets support the Book Cover tablet protection case.

The devices succeeded the Galaxy Tab A9 and A9+ and skipped out releasing a new tablet in the Galaxy Tab A series in 2024.

== Features ==
=== Design ===
Like its predecessors, the Tab A11 & A11+ features a sleek metal body. The Tab A11 & A11+ are available in 2 color options: Grey and Silver.

=== Hardware ===
==== Display ====
The Tab A11, like its predecessor, features an 8.7-inch TFT LCD with a resolution at 800 x 1340 pixels and a 5:3 aspect ratio, with the only upgrade for the display is the addition of the 90 Hz refresh rate. On the other hand, the Tab A11+ kept its screen specifications from its predecessor (TFT LCD display screen, sizing at about 11 inches with a refresh rate of 90 Hz and a resolution of 1200 x 1920 pixels).

==== Performance ====
===== Chipset =====
The Tab A11, like its predecessor, is equipped with the MediaTek Helio G99 chipset and a Mali-G57 MC2 GPU. On the other hand, the Tab A11+ has upgraded its processor: some markets either feature the more powerful MediaTek Dimensity 7300 chipset or the MT 8775 chipset, despite the two chipsets sharing nearly the same specifications.

===== Memory and storage =====
The Tab A11 kept the available options from its predecessor, with 4 or 8 GB of RAM, and 64 or 128 GB of internal storage.

The Tab A11+, meanwhile, discontinues the 4 GB RAM configuration offered in its predecessor, now featuring 6 GB RAM as the base option. An 8 GB RAM variant remains available. Storage configurations now begin at 128 GB, with a 256 GB option also offered.

Both tablets feature storage expansion with the use of the microSD card up to 2 TB. The Tab A11 and Tab A11+ continues to use UFS as its storage type.

==== Battery ====
The Tab A11 has a non-removable Li-po 5100 mAh battery capacity, while the Tab A11+ has a larger battery capacity at about 7040 mAh. The larger tablet now supports 25W Fast Charging, up from the 15W on the Tab A9+.

==== Camera ====
Both the Tab A11 and A11+ features a single 8MP camera with 1080p HD video recording and auto-focus capability. Both tablets also have a 5MP front camera.

==== Other ====
While both tablets have stereo sound, the Tab A11 has only one speaker and the A11+ has quad speakers.

=== Software ===
Despite the two tablets being announced at the same time, both of them had different pre-installed OS versions. The Tab A11 initially have Android 15 (One UI 7.0), while the Tab A11+ initially have Android 16 (One UI 8.0). Both tablets will receive 7 years of software and security updates (with support ending within 2032), a first for the Tab A series.

	Pre-installed OS	OS Upgrades history							End of support
	Pre-installed OS	1st	2nd	3rd	4th	5th	6th	7th	End of support
Tab A11	Android 15 (One UI 7.0)	Android 16 (One UI 8.0); November 2025 (One UI 8.5); May 2026							Within 2032
Tab A11+	Android 16 (One UI 8.0) Minor One UI update: (One UI 8.5); May 2026								Within 2032

== Kids Edition ==
A Kids Edition of the Tab A11+ was first released on November 28, 2025.

The device is made for kids to support Samsung Kids, having parental control leaflet, also includes a protection case, a stylus pen and the stickers.
