= Catalyst Black =

2022 mobile game

- App Store icon
- Developer: Super Evil Megacorp
- Publisher: Super Evil Megacorp
- Engine: E.V.I.L. Engine
- Platforms: iOS, Android
- Release: May 25, 2022
- Genre: Third-person shooter
- Mode: Multiplayer

Catalyst Black is a free-to-play third-person shooter game developed and published by Super Evil Megacorp for iOS and Android. The game centers around players using Primary and Heavy Weapons, along with other Trinkets and Abilities, that enhance the player's gameplay in one of several game modes ranging from standard capture the flag to more intricate team-based and achievement-related game events. Players also have the ability to transform into one of six more powerful beings called a "primal," each having its own set of unique powers and perks.

The game was released globally on May 25, 2022, after several years of development and a closed beta period beginning on August 12, 2020,

== Gameplay ==
Catalyst Black is a third-person battleground shooter where the player controls an avatar that is placed on a team composed of both A.I.-controlled teammates as well as other players. Depending on game mode, teams can range from 5 per team up to 15 on each side. The game is built around the idea of being able to drop-in and drop-out of a mode at any time without penalty.

Players can customize gameplay by unlocking and then swapping out different primary and secondary weapons, such as battle rifles, machine guns, rocket launchers, and others. Additionally, players can equip different abilities and trinkets which give the player other advantages, such as increased movement speed or reduced reloading time of their weapon.

=== Game modes ===
Currently there are 7 different game modes, each with a slightly different objective to win.

- Capture the Flag is a mode where teams attempt to capture the flag of the other team at the opposite side of the map. They then need to return the flag back to their home base, thereby earning a point. The first team to 5 points wins.
- Flag Hunters is a game where players have to collect and hold flags that are dropped by NPC monsters called Guardians. Once a team has 10 flags collectively, a timer starts to count down which is reset if any players on the team currently controlling the most flags dies. At the end of the timer, the team that has control of the flags is the winner.
- Core Rush is a king of the hill style game where players first defeat a Guardian which then spawns a circular area of control that the player must hold for a period of time to gain points. The first team to score 15 points wins.
- Colosseum, which is currently the only PvE game mode, puts players against waves of increasingly difficult monsters in a time-trial style series of events. The faster that the player and their team defeats all the enemies, the more rewards are earned.
- Eventide consists of two teams of up to 15 players each on one of the largest maps in the game. There are multiple mini-game events during the course of the match which add points to each team. The first team to the goal wins the overall match, however players can also earn in-game rewards for individual participation
- Slayer is a true battle royale style game mode which is about getting the most kills until a specified goal, or until the timer runs out. In this mode players that stay alive longer are worth more points when killed, as indicated by the blue diamond indicators over their characters heads.
- Hydra also has the "game within a game" mechanic, similar to Eventide, as there are three separate win conditions that can be met:
  - Collect Shards: Gather and return 20 "shards" which spawn randomly on the map.
  - Overseer: Kill a special boss on the enemy team called the Overseer.
  - Paragon: Lives are unlimited, but each player has three to protect. The last player on a team who has not yet been eliminated three times becomes a Paragon with increased health and damage and the enemy team wins if they kill this person.

== Reception ==
Reception

Aggregate score
Aggregator	Score
Metacritic	79/100

Review scores
Publication	Score
Gamezebo	4/5
Pocket Gamer	4.5/5
Android Central	3.5/5
iMore	4.5/5

Catalyst Black received "generally favorable" reviews, according to review aggregator Metacritic. Reviewers gave high praise to the game's graphics, multiple modes, and loadout customization, but criticized its in-app purchases being pay-to-win. Pocket Gamer's Catherine Ng Dellosa wrote that the gameplay is "smooth, stunning, fast-paced, and most of all, extremely fun." Dellosa express that the only real flaw was more about the story apart from the basic primal descriptions.

Anthony Nash of Android Central felt indifferent about the game's in-app transactions, stating that while there aren't any direct pay-to-win mechanics within the shop, "it's not entirely hard to imagine the game's upgrade mechanics becoming abused by players who don't mind throwing money at it." iMore's Rebecca Spear counters this argument, claiming that "most importantly" she did not feel the need to buy anything to keep up with other players. GameSpot's Jason Faneli shared his experience, citing the unique loadout focus and freedom to design your playstyle from scratch, but wished to see more customization on the character end. Samsung awarded Catalyst Black the Galaxy Store's "Game of the Year".
