= Samsung Wave 533 =

Smartphone

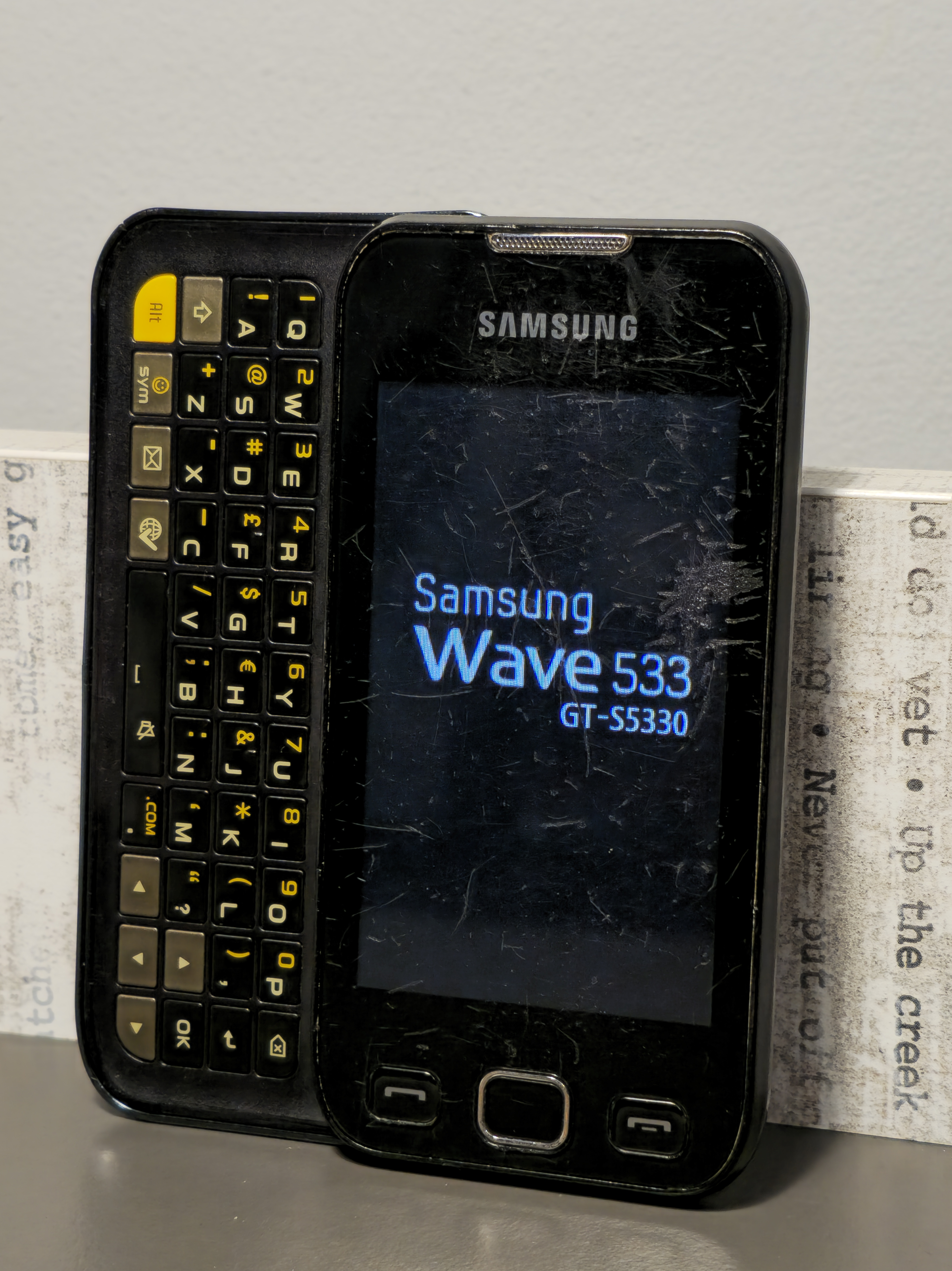
Samsung Wave 533 in black

The Samsung Wave 533 (or Samsung S5330) was a smartphone that was launched by Samsung on October 26, 2010 alongside the Samsung Wave 525. Both hardware and software-wise, the S5330 and Samsung Wave 525 are identical except for the inclusion of a pop-out keyboard on the Samsung Wave 533. The phone initially launched with a price of €150 ($210).

== Specifications ==
=== Body ===
The phone body is made of plastic, with the screen and keyboard portions of the phone being separated by a chrome ring. The screen portion of the phone has 3 buttons: the menu button, and a send and end button, which are marked with a phone and a phone with a bar in between the two earpieces respectively. The keyboard portion of the phone has volume control buttons on the left side, and a dedicated camera activation button on the right along with a lock/power button. The phone was available in 3 colors: black, white, or pink.

=== Screen ===
The screen is a TFT LCD that measures 3.2 inches along the diagonal, and a total surface area of 29.1 $cm^2$. The surface area gives it a screen-to-body ratio of 48.4%. The screen has a resolution of 240×400 pixels, a 5:3 aspect ratio, a pixel density of ~146 ppi, and can display 256K colors. The display has a capacitive touchscreen which allows menu interaction without use of the keyboard or menu button. The menu UI for this phone was the TouchWiz 3.0.

=== Hardware ===
The phone has a single-core processor running at 312 MHz. There is a base amount of storage of 100 MB, which is upgradable with a 16 GB microSD via the phone's microSD port, allowing for up to 16.1 GB total storage.

=== Camera ===
The phone has a 3.15 MP (2048 × 1536 4:3) camera, which is centered at the top of the phone. The phone can also shoot video at 320p at 15 fps.

=== Battery ===
The phone has a rechargeable 1200 mAh lithium-ion battery, which allows for 1090 hours of standby time or 14 hours of talk time (both measured while connected to a 2G network). The phone can be charged via micro USB.

=== Connectivity ===
The phone has WiFi 4, Bluetooth 3.0, Stereo FM Radio, A-GPS, and a microUSB 2.0 port. It has 2G connectivity and can tap into GSM frequency bands 850/900/1800/1900.

=== Operating system ===
The phone has Bada OS 1.1 pre-installed, featuring the TouchWiz 3.0 user interface. While Samsung initially announced that all Wave-series smartphones would receive an update to Bada OS 2.0, the Wave 533 was ultimately excluded from the full 2.0 upgrade due to hardware limitations, such as its 312 MHz single-core processor.

Instead, Samsung released a modified "Value Pack" firmware update based on Bada 1.1. This update backported several Bada 2.0 visual elements, including an updated user interface layout, refreshed application shortcuts, and minor performance optimizations, without upgrading the core operating system architecture.

=== Other features ===
- Multi-touch zoom
- Integrated Contacts
- Integrated Calendar
- Samsung App Suite
- Unified inbox
- Dolfin 2.0 Browser with partial support for HTML 5
- Geo-tagging
- Accelerometer
- Smart Search
