= Galaxy Store =

Digital application distribution platform by Samsung

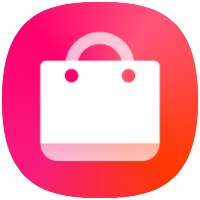
- Developer: Samsung Electronics
- Release: 14 September 2009; 17 years ago (as Samsung Apps)
- Operating system: Android
- Platform: Android; Formerly: Samsung Gear (Tizen), Bada, Samsung feature phones, Windows Mobile, Omnia HD (Symbian)
- Available in: multiple languages
- Type: Digital distribution
- Website: galaxystore.samsung.com

The Galaxy Store (Korean: 갤럭시 스토어) is an app store offering apps, games and exclusive themes and other customizations for mobile devices manufactured by Samsung Electronics. The service is primarily supplied pre-installed on Samsung Galaxy smartphones and tablets, and Galaxy Watch wearables. It requires a Samsung account to be used.

== History ==
The Galaxy Store has its origins in a mobile developer program launched in 2008, Samsung Mobile Innovator. Samsung Mobile Applications, an app store powered by Handango launched at Mobile World Congress 2009 providing software for Windows Mobile, Symbian, and (from August) Java ME. The services had been established in China and several European countries by the third quarter of 2009.

On 14 September 2009, Samsung Apps launched initially in western Europe, providing software for the Samsung Omnia (i900) and Samsung Omnia HD (i8910) smartphones with more devices added later. In 2010 it started offering apps for the Bada platform, which the Samsung Wave runs on. There were 10 million app downloads by September 2010 in Europe, made up of Java, Windows Mobile and Bada apps.

There was also a Samsung Apps TV for smart TVs, which had gotten 10 million downloads by October 2011. Samsung also held a developer challenge called Free the TV Challenge, which was won by WeDraw in 2010, an application that could draw on mobile and display on the TV screen. In March 2011 Samsung Apps was launched for the Galaxy line, running Android. Samsung Apps had 40,000 applications by its second anniversary in 2011. The store was also offered on Samsung Gear wearables and Samsung REX feature phones. A feature called S Suggest (app and www.ssuggest.com) was launched in 2013 that would suggest apps from the store to users. This service was closed in 2014. In July 2014, with the Galaxy line mostly consolidating Samsung's mobile offerings, Samsung Apps was rebranded to Galaxy Apps. In 2018, Samsung began an annual award for the best developers, called Best of Galaxy Store Awards. At the inaugural award at the Samsung Developer Ceremony, Booking.com was awarded 'Best App' and Wrist Camera the 'Best Watch App', amongst others.

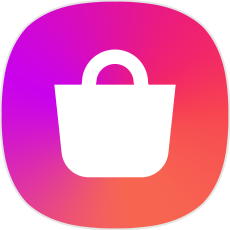
Former app icon

In early 2019, soon after the introduction of One UI, Galaxy Apps was rebranded to Galaxy Store. The store was redesigned in October 2020 with an increased focus on games.

== Games rewards ==
The Galaxy Store features reward points given to users who purchase games.

== Best of Galaxy Store Awards ==
The awards of the latest edition of 2022 were given to:

- Best Theme Collection: Pengtai Interactive Advertising Co.
- Best Wallpaper Collection: Bergen
- Best Icon Pack Collection: Cogul Planet
- Best Music App: SiriusXM Streaming by Sirius XM Radio Inc.
- Best Entertainment App: Vudu by Fandango Media
- Best Podcast: SOLAR by CurtCo Media
- Game of the Year: Catalyst Black by Super Evil Megacorp

2018:

- Best Overall App: Booking.com for Samsung
- Best Gaming App: Disney Heroes by PerBlue
- Best Gear App: Wrist Camera by Kema Studio
- Best Gear Watch Face Designer: Bergen
- Best Theme Designer: Guangxu Zhu

== Samsung apps provided ==
The following is a list of Samsung's first-party apps and components provided on the Galaxy Store. Availability may vary by device and region, and not all apps and components are preinstalled or supported on every device.

Software	Description
AR Doodle	Augmented reality camera for creating doodles
Bixby	Smart voice assistant
Bixby Vision	Augmented reality camera tools: Translate, Text copy, Discover, Wine (formerly)
Calculator	Basic calculator with scientific mode, tips calculator, and unit converters
Calendar	Calendar app
Camera	Photo and video camera (including integrated additions)
Clock	Clock, alarms, timers and countdowns app.
Contacts	Contacts manager
Daily Board	Photo frame emulator for Galaxy tablets
Deco Pic	Decorating personal photos and videos
Device Care	Optimization tool for monitoring battery, storage, memory, and device security
Digital Wellbeing	Screen time monitor tool
Email	Email client
Expert RAW	Image editor capable of editing raw image files
Galaxy Avatar	Augmented reality avatar and emoji creation tool, includes Avatar Camera, Stickers and Editor
Galaxy Enhance-X	AI-powered tool to automatically improve photos
Galaxy Themes	Customization platform for downloading and applying themes, wallpapers, icons, and always-on display styles
Galaxy Wearable	Manager for Galaxy Watch, Galaxy Fit, Galaxy Buds, and Galaxy Ring wearable devices
Gallery	Photo and video gallery, includes stories and OneDrive backup
Gaming Hub	All installed games and Samsung instant plays
Good Guardians	Privileged utilities for Galaxy for device battery, temperature, and more
Good Lock	UI customization and productivity tools for Galaxy
Group Sharing	Share content with other Samsung accounts (integrated)
Health Platform	An aggregator bringing together data from various health apps
Interpreter	Real-time translation tool for face-to-face conversations using voice and text
Messages	SMS, MMS and RCS text messaging client (Note: No longer preinstalled on US devices sold in 2024 or later, following Samsung's transition to Google Messages. Discontinued in the US on July 6, 2026, while still remaining available in other regions.)
Modes and Routines	Conditional automation tool
Multi control	Service for controlling multiple Samsung devices and dragging-and-dropping files
My Files	File manager including FTP/SFTP client and SMB network client and integration with OneDrive and Google Drive
PENUP	Social network for drawings, preinstalled on phones and tablets with S Pen
Phone	Cellular and VoIP calling client
Quick Measure	Augmented reality measuring tool
Quick Share	File transfer tool with nearby Galaxy or Android devices and other devices using link, QR code, or installing Windows App.
Radio	FM radio client (available on Samsung devices with 3.5mm headphone jack)
Reminder	Reminder app with support for syncing with Microsoft To Do
Samsung Blockchain Wallet	Cryptocurrency management
Samsung Browser	Chromium-based web browser
Samsung Cloud	Cloud storage and backup with support for end-to-end encryption
Samsung Find	Asset tracking service for tracing, finding, locking and wiping lost or stolen devices, including smart tags, as well as sharing location with people
Samsung Flow	Text, screen, and file share between phone, tablet, and PC
Samsung Food	Personalized recipe discovery, meal planning, and cooking assistant platform
Samsung Global Goals	Advertising to support donation for the UN's Sustainable Development Goals
Samsung Health	Personal health tracking tool
Samsung Health Monitor	Health monitoring app for ECG and blood pressure measurements on supported devices
Samsung Highlights	Curated content hub showcasing selected articles, media, and recommendations
Samsung Kids	Restricted environment for kids with parental controls
Samsung Members	Community support and exclusive content, including device diagnostics
Samsung Music	Music player of formats including MP3, WMA, AAC and FLAC, with support for Spotify integration (Note: Spotify available in 184 markets.)
Samsung News	News aggregator from various sources depending by region (provided by Upday in parts of Europe). Can be integrated (media page) into the One UI home screen. Replaced Samsung Free/Samsung O's Read tab. (Note: Samsung Free, also called Samsung O in some territories, was a media and entertainment app integrating Samsung TV Plus, Podcasts (region dependent), Samsung News news aggregator and instant casual games, from 2020-2023 or 2020-2025 depending on territory.)
Samsung Notes	Note-taking, sketching and PDF reader and editor
Samsung Shop	Storefront for Samsung Electronics products
Samsung TTS (Text-to-speech)	Speech synthesis
Samsung TV Plus	Free ad-supported television streaming service (available in selected markets)
Samsung Visit In	Provides location-based notifications for nearby Samsung store offers
Samsung Wallet	Digital wallet (Samsung Pay payment system, Samsung Pass password manager) (available in 32 markets)
Smart Switch	Data transfer tool to move content to a new Galaxy device from any phone including iPhones, also serves as service for Smart Switch PC and backup for Galaxy Watches
SmartThings	Smart home management platform
Secure Folder	Private and encrypted sandboxed workspace using Knox
Secure Wi-Fi	VPN network service, available in select countries and regions
Studio	Create a project using pictures and/or videos
Tips	Device information, manual and remote support; not available on low-end models
Voice Recorder	Voice recording in M4A format (3gp4 codec) up to 256 kbit/s/48 kHz
Weather	Weather information provided by The Weather Channel

== Third-parties ==
Some third-party apps are also available on the Galaxy Store, despite Galaxy devices running on the Google Mobile Services platform which features the Play Store. These apps include the likes of Firefox, Microsoft 365, Wikipedia, and Clip Studio Paint. Some Android games have been exclusive on the Galaxy Store, such as Fortnite for users in the US.

== See also ==
- List of Android app stores
- App store
- List of mobile app distribution platforms
- Google Play Store
- App Store
- Ovi Store
- BlackBerry World
