= PENUP =

Software by Samsung Electronics

- Developer: Samsung Electronics
- Initial release: September 2013
- Stable release: 3.9.11.56 / July 12, 2023; 2 years ago
- Operating system: Android, World Wide Web, Windows
- Type: Digital painting, social media network
- Website: www.penup.com

PENUP is a digital painting app and related online community created by Samsung Electronics for users with the S Pen stylus.

== Features ==
The PENUP application lets users draw and colour. A dedicated colouring book, and layer functionality, was added in version 3.6.00.15. Users can share their work with the PENUP interactive community.
