= Samsung Galaxy Tab A9 =

2023 mid-range Android tablet computers by Samsung Electronics

Samsung Galaxy Tab A9 Samsung Galaxy Tab A9+
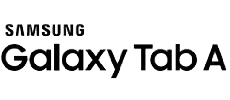

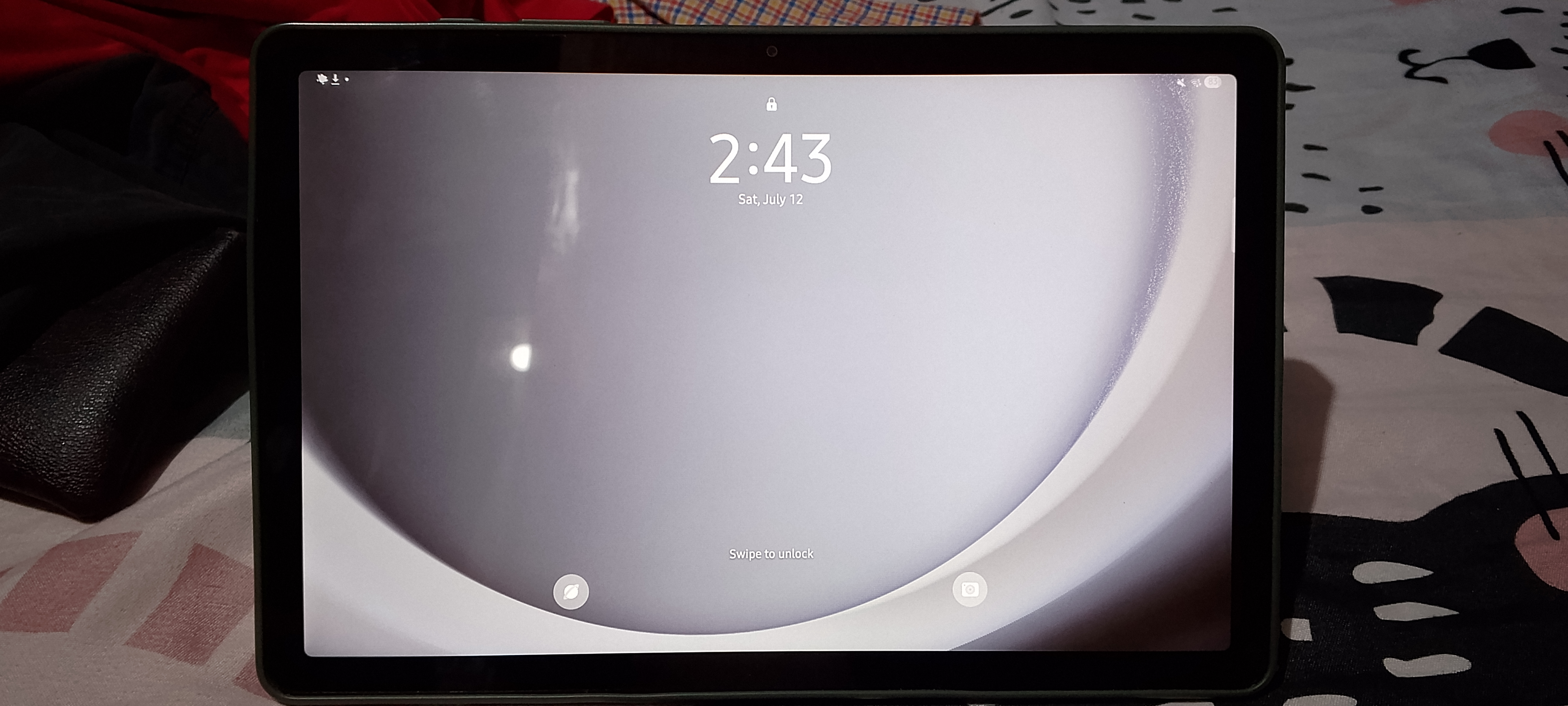
- Samsung Galaxy Tab A9+
- Brand: Samsung
- Manufacturer: Samsung Electronics
- Type: Tablet computer
- Series: Galaxy Tab A
- Family: Samsung Galaxy
- First released: October 5, 2023; 3 years ago
- Availability by region: Tab A9: October 5, 2023; 3 years ago Tab A9+: October 17, 2023; 3 years ago
- Discontinued: Tab A9: September 15, 2025; 14 months ago Tab A9+: November 2, 2025; 12 months ago
- Predecessor: Samsung Galaxy Tab A8
- Successor: Samsung Galaxy Tab A11
- Compatible networks: GSM (2G) 850 / 900 / 1800 / 1900; HSDPA (3G) 850 / 900 / 1700(AWS) / 1900 / 2100; LTE 4G 1, 2, 3, 4, 5, 7, 8, 12, 13 (Tab A9+ only), 17, 20, 26 (Tab A9+ only), 28, 38, 40, 41, 66; 5G 1, 3, 5, 7, 8, 20, 28, 38, 40, 41, 66, 77, 78 SA/NSA/Sub6 (Tab A9+ only)
- Colors: Graphite, Silver, and Navy
- Dimensions: Tab A9: 211 x 124.7 x 8 mm Tab A9+: 257.1 x 168.7 x 6.9 mm
- Operating system: Original: Android 13 with One UI 5.1.1; Current: Android 16 with One UI 8
- System-on-chip: Tab A9: Mediatek Helio G99 (6 nm); Tab A9+ Qualcomm SM6375 Snapdragon 695 5G (6 nm)
- CPU: Tab A9: 2x2.2 GHz Cortex-A76 & 6x2.0 GHz Cortex-A55; Tab A9+: 2x2.2 GHz Kryo 660 Gold & 6x1.8 GHz Kryo 660 Silver
- GPU: Tab A9: Mali-G57 MC2; Tab A9+ Adreno 619
- Memory: 4/8GB RAM
- Storage: 64/128/256 GB
- SIM: Nano-SIM + eSIM (cellular model only)
- Battery: Tab A9: Li-po 5100 mAh; Tab A9+: Li-po 7040 mAh
- Charging: 15W Type-C 2.0 wired charging
- Rear camera: 8 MP, autofocus Video: 1080p@30fps
- Front camera: 2 MP (Tab A9); 5 MP (Tab A9+); Video: 1080p@30fps
- Data inputs: Accelerometer; Proximity; Compass
- Website: Galaxy Tab A9

The Samsung Galaxy Tab A9 and A9+ are a lineup of two Android-based tablets manufactured, developed and marketed by Samsung Electronics. They were first announced and released on October 5, 2023, for the Tab A9, and later on October 17 for the Tab A9+. The Galaxy Tab A9+ is a larger version of the standard Tab A9, with a more powerful central processor and GPU. Both the Tab A9 & Tab A9+ support the Book Cover tablet protection case.

The devices were succeeded by the Galaxy Tab A11/A11+, first announced in September 2025.

== Design ==
The Tab A9 & A9+ features a metallic body. Its speaker is stereo, the Tab A9 has only one speaker at the bottom and the A9+ has 4 speakers on both sides. The Tab A9 & A9+ are available in 3 color options: Graphite, Silver, and Navy.

== Specifications ==
=== Hardware ===
The Tab A9 was equipped with a 2x2.2 GHz Cortex-A76 and 6x2.0 GHz Cortex-A55 octa-core CPU with Mediatek Helio G99 chipset and a Mali-G57 MC2 GPU. On the other hand, the Tab A9+ features a more powerful 2x2.2 GHz Kryo 660 Gold and 6x1.8 GHz Kryo 660 Silver octa-core central processor with a Qualcomm SM6375 Snapdragon 695 5G chipset and an Adreno 619 chipset.

The Tab A9 features an 8.7-inch TFT LCD with a resolution at 800 x 1340 pixels and a 5:3 aspect ratio with 179 ppi. The Tab A9 was available at 64 or 128GB of storage and 4 or 8GB of RAM. On the other hand, the Galaxy Tab A9+ has a bigger TFT LCD display screen, sizing at about 11 inches with a higher frame rate of 90Hz, a higher pixel density at about 206 ppi, a bigger resolution at 1200 x 1920 pixels and it also has a 256GB option.

The A9 has a non-removable Li-po 5100 mAh battery capacity, while the Tab A9+ has a larger battery capacity at about 7040 mAh.

=== Camera ===
Both the Tab A9 and A9+ features a single 8-MP camera with 1080p HD video recording and auto-focus capability. The Tab A9 has a 2MP front camera, while the A9+ has a higher 5MP front camera and positioned in a landscape orientation.

=== Software ===
Both tablets initially have the Android 13 operating system with One UI 5.1.1 interface. They are eligible for 3 major OS upgrades and 4 years of security updates. They are the last in the Samsung Galaxy Tab A series to receive this level of support as its successors would have an extended software support. Currently, it is upgradable to Android 16 with the One UI 8.0 interface.

== Reception ==
PCMag reviewed this tablet as a "refined design and smooth performance", but its storage amount is low and overlooked. Overall, it was nominated as the next winner in Editor's Choice for Android tablets.

NoteBookChecked reviewed that the Tab A9+ is considered to be as "fast and far better-quipped successor to the Galaxy Tab A8".
