= Samsung Wave Y =

Smartphone

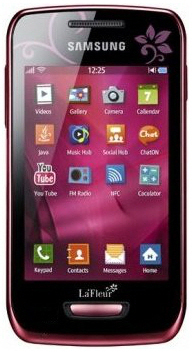
Picture of the Samsung Wave Y

The Samsung Wave Y, also known as the Samsung S5380 was announced in August 2011 and released later that year in November. It was marketed as a budget alternative to Samsung's higher-end Samsung Wave III. The phone initially sold for €90 (~$120).

== Specifications ==
=== Body ===
The dimensions of the phone are 110 mm × 58.2 mm × 12.3 mm (4.33 in × 2.29 in × 0.48 in). The back panel is constructed from a rubber-like and highly flexible plastic. The camera and speaker grill can be found at the top on the back panel. There are stylistic grooves along the back panel, and there is a crevice on the left side of the phone for prying off the back panel. Behind the panel is the battery, mini-SIM, and microSD ports. The microSD port is hot-swappable, since it isn't hidden behind the battery; however, the SIM port is only visible after taking out the battery. Also on the left side of the phone is the volume rocker and a lanyard eyelet for connecting a keychain to the phone. On the right side is the power button, which is flush against the body of the phone. On the front of the phone there are three buttons; a home button, along with two backlit capacitive call buttons. The 3.5 mm headphone jack is at the top of the phone, and the microphone and microUSB port are at the bottom of the phone. The phone comes in black and LaFleur edition coloring.

=== Screen ===
The phone screen is a TFT LCD which measures 3.2 inches along the diagonal. It has a resolution of 320×480 (3:2 aspect ratio) and an area of 30.5 cm^2 (~180 ppi density).

=== Hardware ===
The phone has a single-core ARMv6 ARM1136 32-bit Broadcom BCM21553 processor running at 832 MHz and VideoCore IV GPU. The phone comes with an initial capacity of 150 MB. Samsung included a 2 GB microSD with S5380s, but storage can be expanded further with up to a 32 GB microSD card.

=== Camera ===
The phone has a 2 MP camera which can take pictures at a resolution of 1600×1200. Video can be recorded at w480p@30 fps (320×240). Unlike its higher-end variants, the S5380 does not have autofocus or LED flash. The camera app allows digital zoom up to 1.4x.

=== Battery ===
The phone has a 1200 mAh rechargeable and replaceable lithium-ion battery. Charging occurs via the microUSB port at the bottom of the phone. On stand-by the phone lasts for 570 hours, or 6 hours 40 minutes continuous talk time on a full charge. The phone cannot connect to 2G, so there are no alternative stats for that option.

=== Connectivity ===
The phone can connect to GPRS, EDGE, or 3G with HSPA. GSM and EDGE are quad-band (850/900/1800/1900 MHz), and 3G (HSPA) is dual-band (900/2100 MHz). The phone also has WiFi 4 and Bluetooth 3.0, and Stereo FM radio. Users can navigate with A-GPS. For physical connectivity, users can use the microUSB 2.0 port to connect to a computer using a compatible cable. There are four connection modes available through this; Modem, Mass Storage, Samsung Kies, and USB debugging. Samsung Kies connects the phone to the computer, whilst Mass Storage mounts the phone's internal storage and microSD as separate navigable drives on your computer.

=== Operating system ===
The phone comes with bada OS 2.0 built in, which Samsung optimized to run on the lower-spec hardware in the S5380. Bada support would be discontinued less than a year later. Touch interaction is provided by the TouchWiz UI.

=== Other features ===
- Accelerometer
- Proximity sensor
- Samsung ChatON
- MP3/WAV/eAAC+ player
- MP4/H.264 player
- Organizer
- Photo editor
- Voice memo
- Predictive text input (T9 Trace)
- Handwriting recognition

== See also ==
- Broadcom
- VideoCore
- Samsung
