= Samsung Wave 525 =

Budget smartphone

The Samsung Wave 525, also known as the Samsung S5250 or the Samsung Wave 2, is a smartphone which was released alongside the Samsung S8530 in October 2010 as an entry-level alternative. The phone was launched with a price tag of $170 (€120).

== Specifications ==
=== Design ===
The Samsung Wave 525 measures 109.5 mm × 55 mm × 11.9 mm (4.31 in × 2.17 in × 0.47 in) and weighs 100 g (3.53 oz).The phone has three color options, black, white, and pink, which is sometimes referred to as the "La Fleur" edition, which was white with pink flower patterning on the front and back of the phone. The phone has three buttons on the front, two for starting or ending a call, and one for menu navigation.

=== Hardware ===
==== Storage ====
The phone comes equipped with 100 MB of internal storage which is upgradable via a microSD card up to 16 GB

==== Screen ====
The screen is a WQVGA TFT LCD with 400×240 pixels resolution, 5:3 aspect ratio, ~146 ppi pixel density, and 256K colors. The screen also features a capacitive layer which allows it to be used as a touchscreen. The screen itself measures 70 mm × 42 mm (2.91 in × 1.65 in) which gives a screen-to-body ratio of about 48.3%.

==== Camera ====
The phone has a rear-facing 3.2-megapixel camera. However, users can adjust the photo resolution all the way down to 0.1 megapixels via software. Also within the camera software package, there is the ability to apply special effects such as Sepia, Negative image, and Black and white, along with white balance options such as Auto, Incandescent lamp, Daylight, Fluorescent lamp, and Cloudy.

Users can also record video in MP4 or 3GP with a resolution of 320×240 or 176×144 at 15 frames per second and a bitrate of ~ 500 kbit/s.

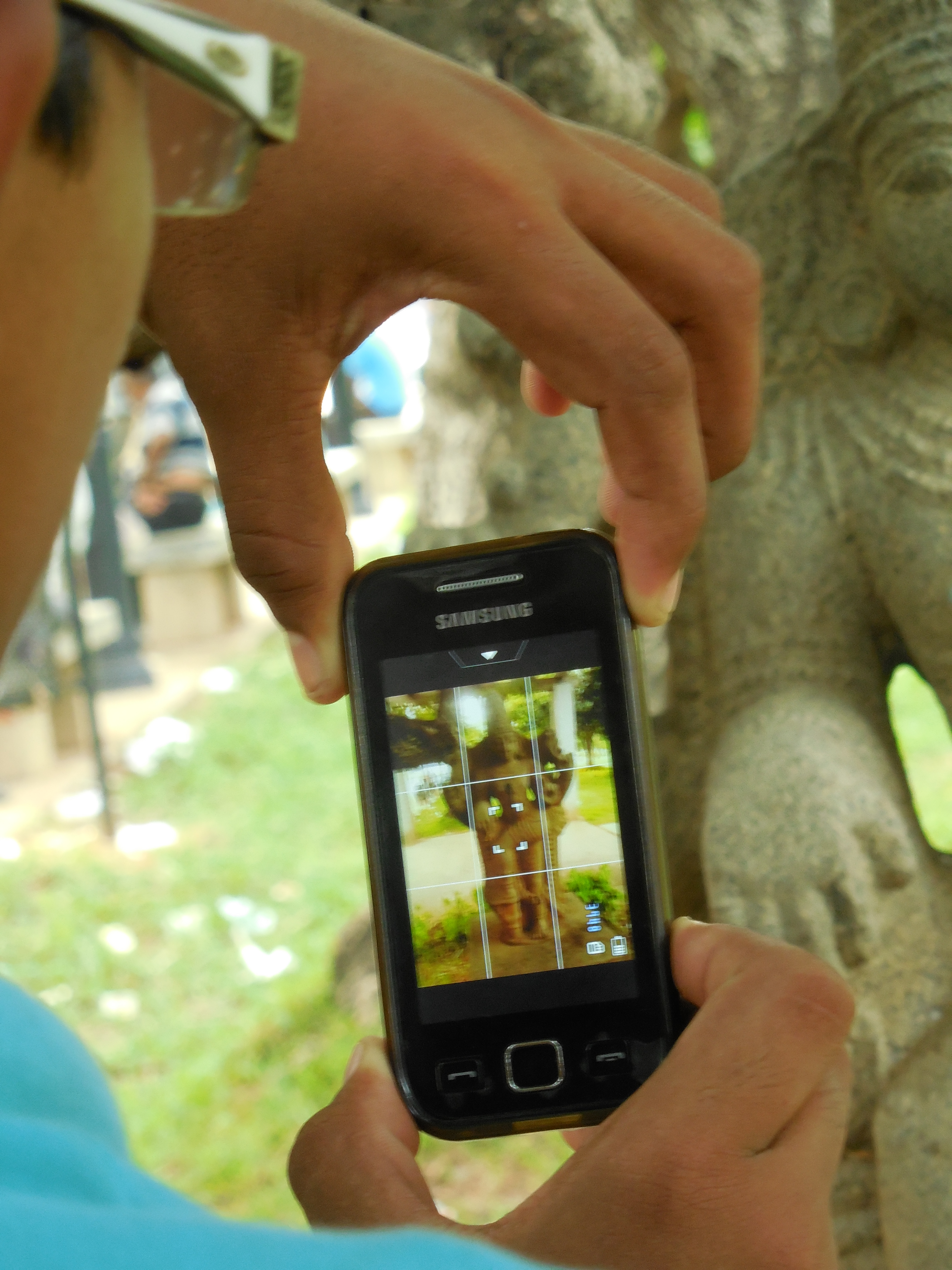
A picture being taken by the Samsung Wave 525

==== Battery ====
The phone comes with a replaceable 1200 mAh lithium-ion battery. It can be charged by the microUSB 2.0 port. Results varied, but battery offered about 14 hours of talk time and 1200 hours on standby on a full charge with a new battery.

==== Connectivity ====
The phone is equipped with Bluetooth 3.0, Wi-Fi 4, and stereo FM radio. There is also a 3.5 mm headphone jack at the top.

==== Other features ====
- A-GPS
- Accelerometer
- Proximity sensor
- Haptic feedback
- Music and polyphonic ringtones
- Vibration
- Flight mode
- Silent mode
- Speakerphone

=== Software ===
The device has the built-in bada OS with TouchWiz user interface.
