= Compaq tc series =

Compaq tc series was a line of ultraportable convertible devices:

- Compaq tc1000 — convertible 10.4" tablet PC (2003)
- HP Compaq tc1100 — upgrade of tc1100 (2004)
- HP Compaq tc4200 — convertible 12.1" laptop computer (2005)
- HP Compaq tc4400 — upgrade of tc4200 (2006)

This line was succeeded by the HP EliteBook 2700 series.
