= Asus Eee Top =

Computer

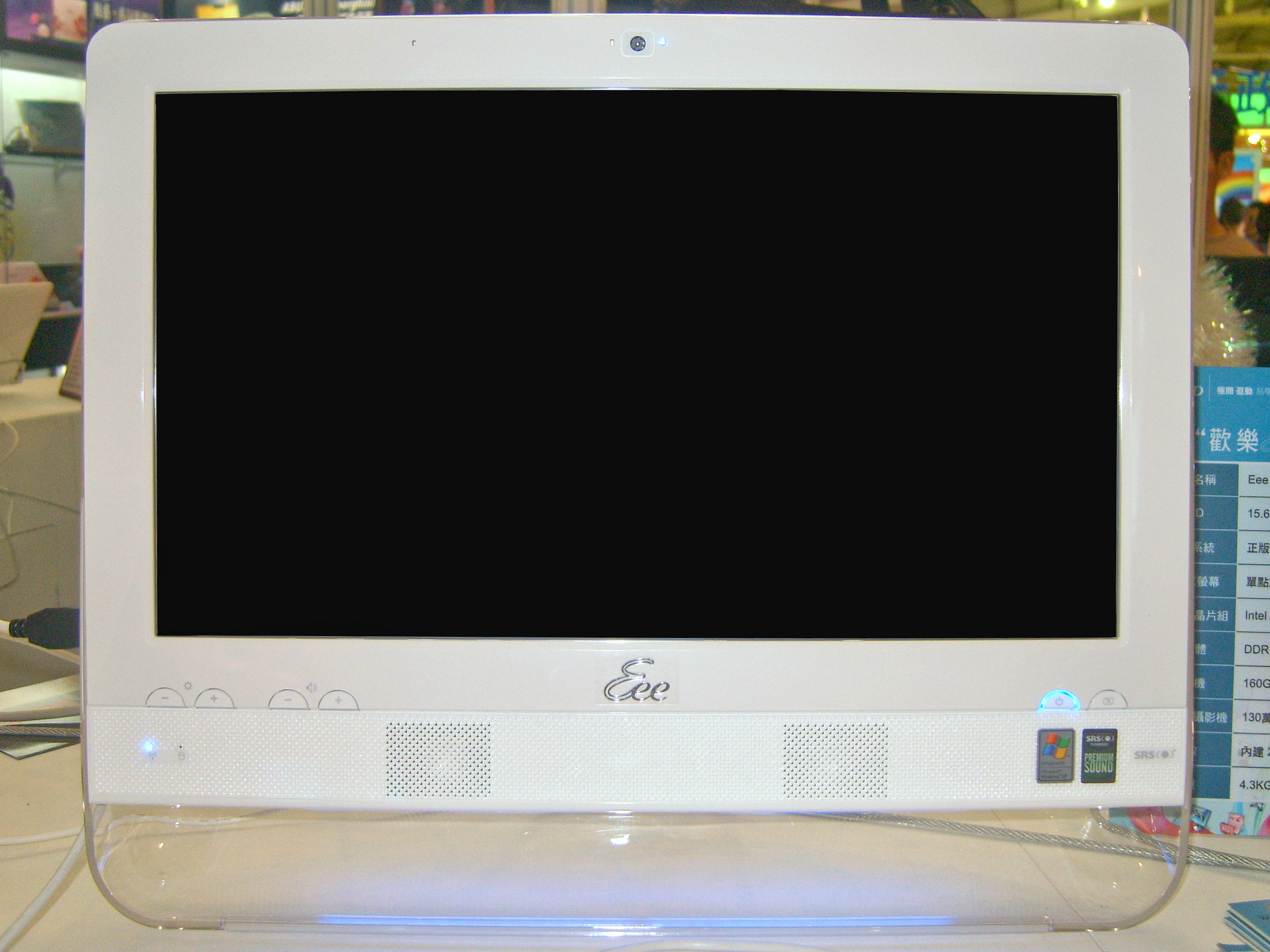
- Developer: ASUSTeK Computer Inc.
- Type: Touch screen desktop computer
- Operating system: Xandros Linux; Microsoft Windows XP
- Website: asus.com

The Asus Eee Top (with the second word pronounced /ˈiː/) is a touch screen all-in-one desktop computer designed by Asus and released in November 2008. Its motherboard employs Splashtop technology called "ExpressGate" by Asus.

There are four models in this series, the ET1602, ET1603, ET2002 and ET2203d.

The ET 1602 and 1603 models feature a 1.6 GHz Intel Atom processor, wide-screen (16:9) 15.6" display, 1 GB of DDR2 RAM, 160 GB SATA HDD, 802.11b/g/draft-n Wi-Fi, speakers, SD card reader and a 1.3MP webcam with Windows XP Home modified with Asus' big-icon Easy Mode.

The difference between the models is in the graphics cards. The 1602 has integrated graphics chipset, but the 1603 includes a separate video card, the ATI Mobility Radeon HD 3450.

In August 2009, two more models were introduced, the ET2002 and ET2203. The ET2002 is the first all-in-one to use the Nvidia Ion platform with the Atom 330 and nVidia GeForce 9400 IGP. The ET2203 includes a Blu-ray player, a Core 2 Duo T6600 processor and an ATI Mobility Radeon HD 4570 graphics card. These models can also be used as standalone monitors with the ability to connect an HDMI-equipped gaming console such as the PS3 or Xbox 360, and other HDMI-equipped peripherals to the HDMI input.

== Models ==
Model Number	Eee Top ET1602	Eee Top ET1603	Eee Top ET2002	Eee Top ET2203
Processor	Intel Atom N270 (1.6 GHz, 533 MHz FSB, 512 KB L2 Cache)	Intel Atom N270 (1.6 GHz, 533 MHz FSB, 512 KB L2 Cache)	Intel Atom 330 (1.6 GHz, 533 MHz FSB, 1 MB L2 Cache)	Intel Core 2 Duo T6600 (2.2 GHz, 800 MHz FSB, 2 MB L2 Cache)
Memory	1 GB of DDR2-533 SO-DIMM Expandable to 2 GB	1 GB of DDR2-533 SO-DIMM Expandable to 2 GB	2 GB of DDR2-800 SO-DIMM Expandable to 4 GB	4 GB of DDR2-800 SO-DIMM
Hard Drive	160 GB SATA @ 5,400 RPM	160 GB SATA @ 5,400 RPM	250 GB or 320 GB SATA @ 5,400 RPM	320 GB or 500 GB SATA @ 5,400 RPM
Graphics Processor	integrated Intel GMA 950	ATI Radeon HD 3450	integrated nVidia GeForce 9400M G graphics	ATI Radeon HD 4570
Display	15.6" touch-screen w/1366 × 768 resolution	15.6" touch-screen w/1366 × 768 resolution	20" touch-screen w/1600 × 900 resolution	22" touch-screen w/1920 × 1080 resolution
Wireless Networking	802.11b/g/draft-n	802.11b/g/draft-n	802.11b/g/draft-n	802.11b/g/draft-n
Optical Drive	none	none	CD/DVD Burner	CD/DVD Burner w/Blu-ray playback
Camera	1.3 MP w/Digital microphone	1.3 MP w/Digital microphone	Yes w/Digital microphone	Yes w/Digital microphone
I/O ports	6 Hi-Speed USB 2.0 ports, 1 3-in-1 card reader, 1 headphone port, 1 microphone port, power adapter connector, Gigabit Ethernet port, 3x High Definition Audio outputs	6 Hi-Speed USB 2.0 ports, 1 3-in-1 card reader, 1 headphone port, 1 microphone port, power adapter connector, Gigabit Ethernet port, 3x High Definition Audio outputs	6 Hi-Speed USB 2.0 ports, 1 3-in-1 card reader, 1 headphone port, 1 microphone port, power adapter connector, Gigabit Ethernet port, S/PDIF port and HDMI input	6 Hi-Speed USB 2.0 ports, 1 3-in-1 card reader, 1 headphone port, 1 microphone port, power adapter connector, Gigabit Ethernet port, S/PDIF port and HDMI input

== See also ==
- HP TouchSmart
- iMac
