= Xp64 =

XP64 may refer to:

- An experimental series of British Railways passenger coaches
- Windows XP64 computer operating system
