= Latitude ON =

Dell computer system

Latitude ON is an instant-on computer system made by Dell. It is a combination of software and hardware developed by Dell and used in some of their Latitude laptops. The system is based on a dedicated ARM processor (Texas Instruments OMAP 3430) that runs a custom version of a Linux OS. It was announced on August 12, 2008, along with other laptops, including a potential competitor to the Asus Eee PC and arrived a year later on 28 September 2009.

Latitude ON runs MontaVista Linux on an ARM-based subprocessor. This so-called MontaVista Montabello Mobile Internet Device Solution provides a customizable, Linux-based Mobile Internet Device (MID) platform the laptop is able to boot almost instantly and view Email, document reader, calendar, contacts and access the Internet.

First laptop models to include Latitude ON were the E4200 and E4300 released in February 2009. Last laptop model introduced so far is Latitude Z600. Dell claims that battery life can be extended to days.

Latitude ON Reader is similar to Dell's MediaDirect where the software is located in a separate partition on the system hard drive and has a dedicated button to power on.

== Versions ==
There are several versions of Latitude ON:

- Dell Latitude ON | Reader - Dell's initial release of the technology. The Reader software resides on the main partition of the hard drive, boots in 15–25 seconds, uses the laptop's CPU, and provides read-only access to e-mail, calendar and contacts from the last synced version of the system's Outlook data. No web browser.
- Dell Latitude ON | FLASH - runs on a flash module, but uses the system's CPU, without significantly increased battery life. Features: boots in 8–10 seconds, supports Wi-Fi and LAN, thin client capabilities with Web access or Citrix, VMware and RDP clients, multi-protocol IM, VoIP (Skype, using the built-in webcam if present), Microsoft Office document viewer and editor (requires Internet connection), Java, Adobe Flash.
- Dell Latitude ON | ECM - boots in 2–3 seconds and runs on the dedicated sub-processor, with Wi-Fi or Mobile Broadband support. Includes document reader, and read/write access to e-mail, calendar and contacts, and Firefox, but without Adobe Flash or other media plugins. Supports Novell GroupWise and Cisco VPN. Long battery life (about 17 hours on a 6-cell battery).

== See also ==
- Splashtop
- HyperSpace
