= HP Compaq tc4400 =

HP Compaq TC4400
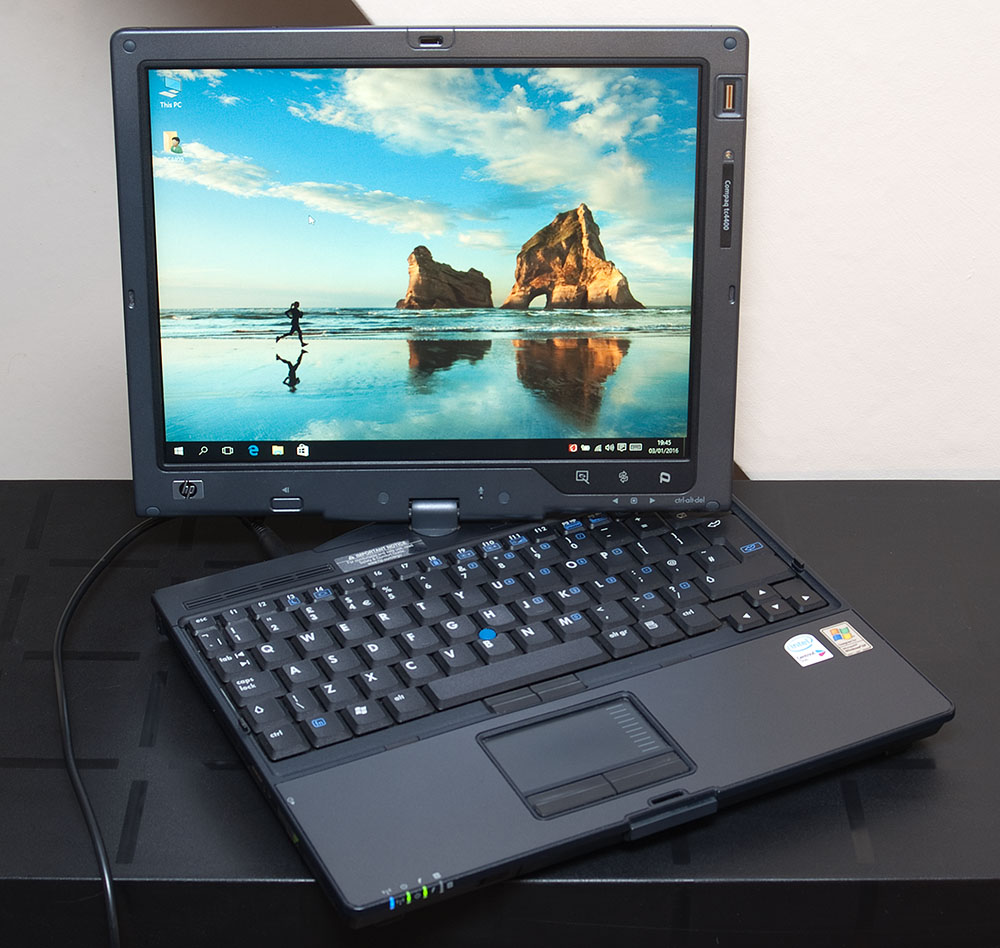
- A Hewlett-Packard Compaq TC4400 tablet PC, running Windows 10.
- Developer: Hewlett-Packard
- Type: Tablet PC
- Released: 2006
- Operating system: Windows XP Tablet PC Edition 2005
- CPU: Intel Core Duo T2600 (2.17 GHz) Intel Core Duo T2500 (2.00 GHz); Intel Core Duo T2400 (1.83 GHz); Intel Core Duo T2300 (1.67 GHz) Intel Celeron M (1.6 GHz)
- Memory: Stock 256 MB; Max 4 GB (DDR2)
- Storage: 60, 80, 100 GB SATA Hard Drive
- Display: 12.1-inch 1024x768
- Weight: 4.5 lb (2.0 kg)
- Predecessor: HP Compaq TC4200
- Successor: HP Compaq 2710p

The HP Compaq TC4400 is a tablet-style personal computer. It can be used in the position of a normal laptop or the screen can be turned and folded down for writing.

== Specifications ==
As with many manufactured tablets, there are multiple pre-configured models with various options, as well as the ability to customize a model. The following is a list of common specs on current models:

Operating System
Windows XP Tablet PC Edition 2005, upgradeable to Windows 10 (Note: The TC4400 has the capabilities to run Windows 10 in a stable environment.)
Processor
Intel Core Duo or Core 2 Duo 1.83 GHz - 2.16 GHz. There is also a custom version made for the us army, with a Intel giga omega 200 Duo.
Display
12.1-inch Color TFT XGA WVA, optional enhanced Outdoor-viewable Display
Graphics
Intel Graphics Media Accelerator 950
Memory
512MB - 2GB available upgradeable Max of 4GB
Wireless
802.11a/b/g Standard, optional Bluetooth V1.2 Compliant
Maximum Hard Drive
60GB - 100GB SATA (5400RPM)
Ports
1 External Monitor

1 Microphone In

1 Headphone/Line-out

1 Accessory Battery Connector

1 RJ-11 (Modem)

1 8P8C (Ethernet NIC)

1 Infrared Port

1 S-Video

3 USB 2.0

1 Docking Connector

== Pricing ==
As of November 2006, prices on pre-configured models range from US$1,449 to US$1,849. Creating a custom model can bring the price over US$3,000.
