= UWF =

UWF may refer to:

- Uncoated wood-free paper
- University of West Florida, US
- Unified Write Filter

== Wrestling promotions ==
- Universal Wrestling Federation (Bill Watts), US
- Universal Wrestling Federation (Herb Abrams), US
- Universal Wrestling Federation (Japan)
- Universal Lucha Libre, which used the acronym UWF
