= HP Compaq tc4200 =

Tablet PC released in 2005

HP Compaq TC4200
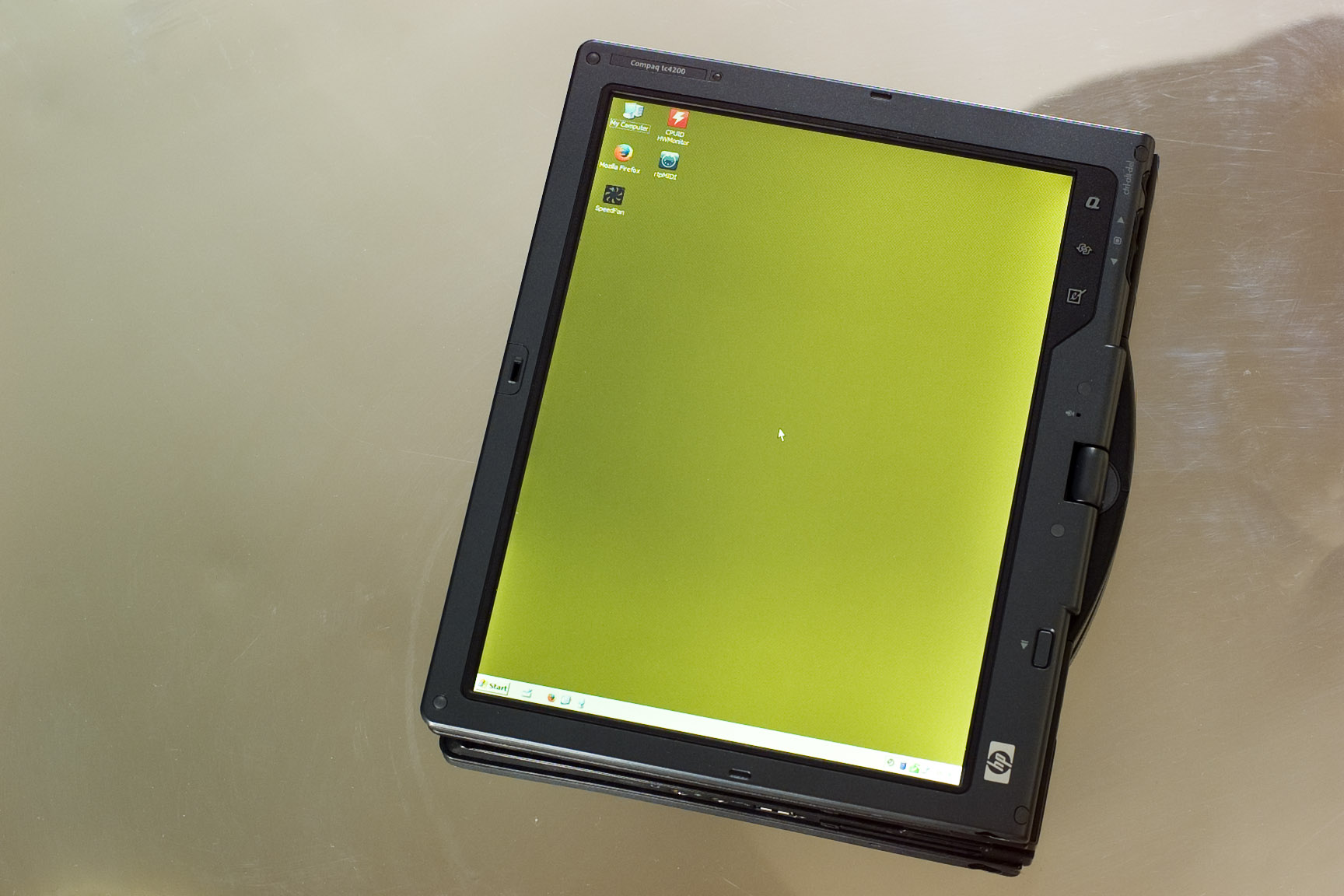
- A Hewlett-Packard Compaq TC4200 tablet PC, in tablet configuration, running Windows XP.
- Developer: Hewlett-Packard
- Type: Tablet PC
- Released: 2005
- Operating system: Windows XP Tablet PC Edition 2005
- CPU: Intel Pentium M 2.13, 2.0, 1.86, 1.73, 1.6 GHz; Intel Celeron M 1.5 GHz
- Memory: Stock 256 MB; Max 2 GB (400 MHz SDRAM)
- Storage: 40, 60, 80 GB Hard Drive
- Display: 12.1-inch 1024x768
- Dimensions: 11.22 in × 9 in × 1.19 in (28.5 cm × 22.9 cm × 3.0 cm)
- Weight: 4.5 lb (2.0 kg)
- Predecessor: HP Compaq tc1100
- Successor: HP Compaq tc4400

The HP Compaq TC4200 was a Tablet PC that was released on March 1, 2005, and has since been discontinued. It is believed to be the successor to the TC1100, which was discontinued in Q4 of 2005. The TC4200 boasted many powerful features that could be found on mid to high-range laptops and competing tablets during its production. The TC4200 was superseded by the similar HP Compaq TC4400.

== Specifications ==
Operating System	Windows XP Tablet PC Edition 2005
Processor Type	Intel Pentium M
Display	12.1-inch Color TFT XGA wide viewing angle display with digitizer (1024 x 768 resolution and 16 M colors)
Maximum Memory	2GB
Wireless	Intel PRO/Wireless 2915ABG 802.11 a/b/g WLAN Bluetooth V1.2 Compliant
Maximum Hard Drive	80GB SMART
Ports	1 External Monitor 1 Microphone In 1 Headphone/Line-out 1 DC Power 1 RJ-11 (Modem) 1 RJ-45 (NIC) 1 Infrared Port 1 S-Video 3 USB 2.0 1 VGA Port 1 Docking Connector

More extensive specs list
