= PowerDirector =

Fiber.. App developed by CyberLink

- PowerDirector
- Developer: CyberLink
- Release: June 2001; 25 years ago
- Stable release: 24.0.0828 / November 10, 2025; 9 months ago
- Operating system: Windows 11; Windows 10; Windows 8/8.1; Windows 7 macOS Mojave; Android iOS
- Available in: English, French, German, Italian, Spanish (European), Chinese Simplified, Chinese Traditional, Japanese, Korean, Dutch
- Type: Video editing software
- License: Freemium
- Website: www.cyberlink.com/products/powerdirector-ultra/features_en_US.html

PowerDirector (Chinese: 威力導演; pinyin: Wēilì Dǎoyǎn) is a video editing program developed by CyberLink. The software is available on macOS, Windows, iOS and Android.

== See also ==
- List of video editing software
