= HP TouchSmart =

Range of tablet PC laptops

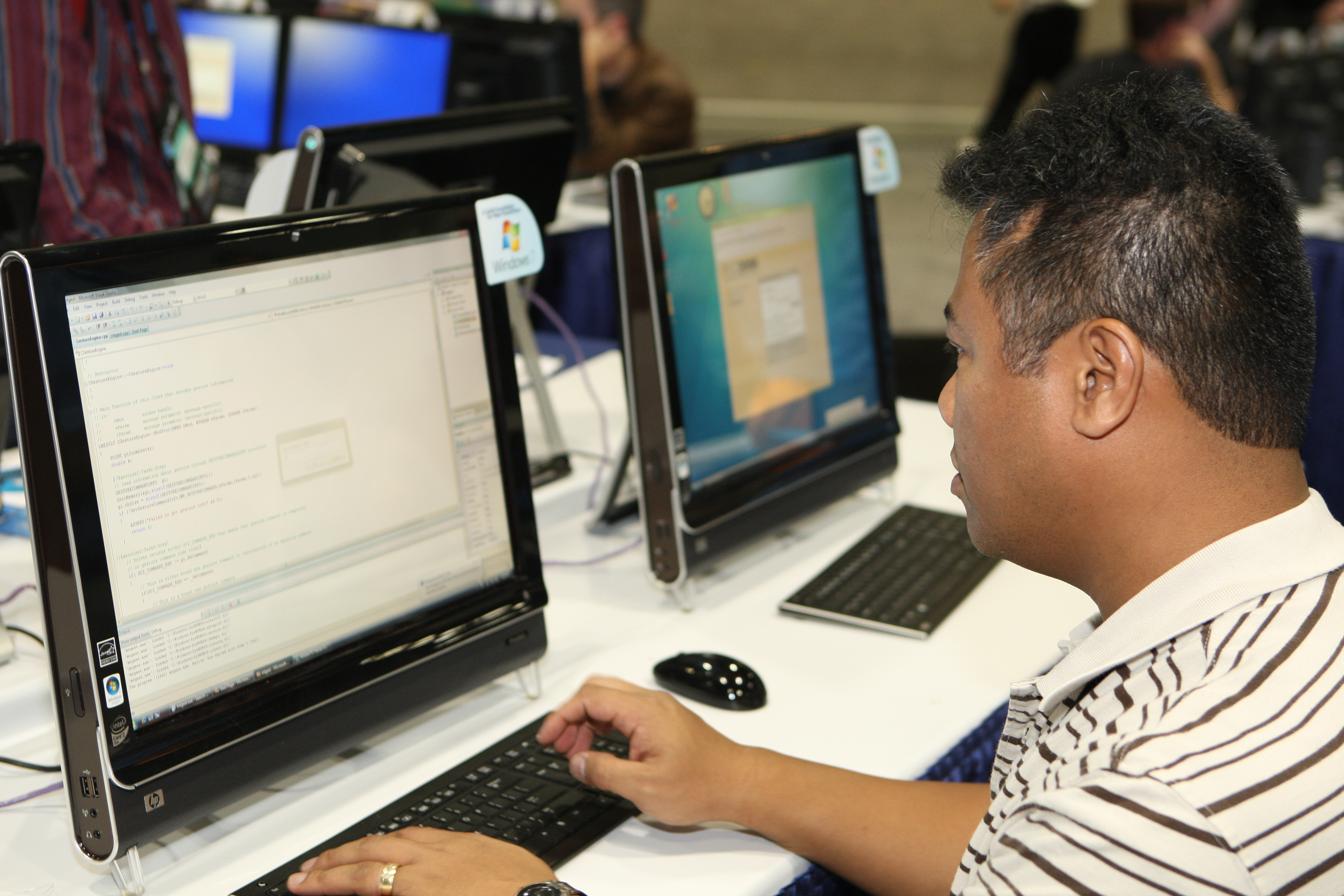
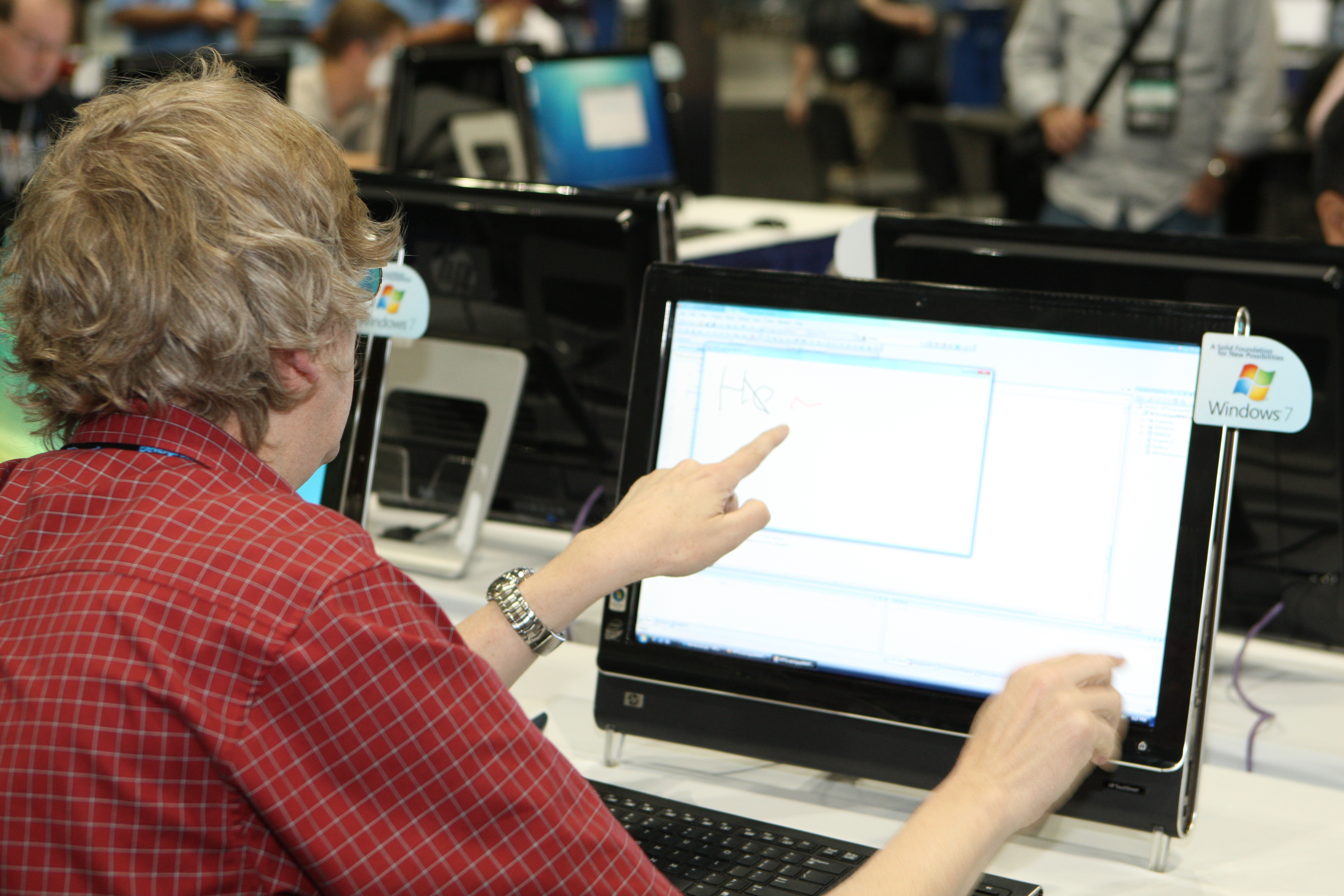
The Touchsmart 2 (shown) can be used like a traditional computer (left) or by using the touchscreen (right).

HP TouchSmart is a series of tablet PC laptops and touchscreen all-in-one desktop computers designed by HP. It features various Intel or AMD processors and runs Windows Vista or Windows 7 as standard.

== HP TouchSmart All-in-One ==
=== Consumer version ===
==== HP TouchSmart Crossfire ====
HP TouchSmart Crossfire
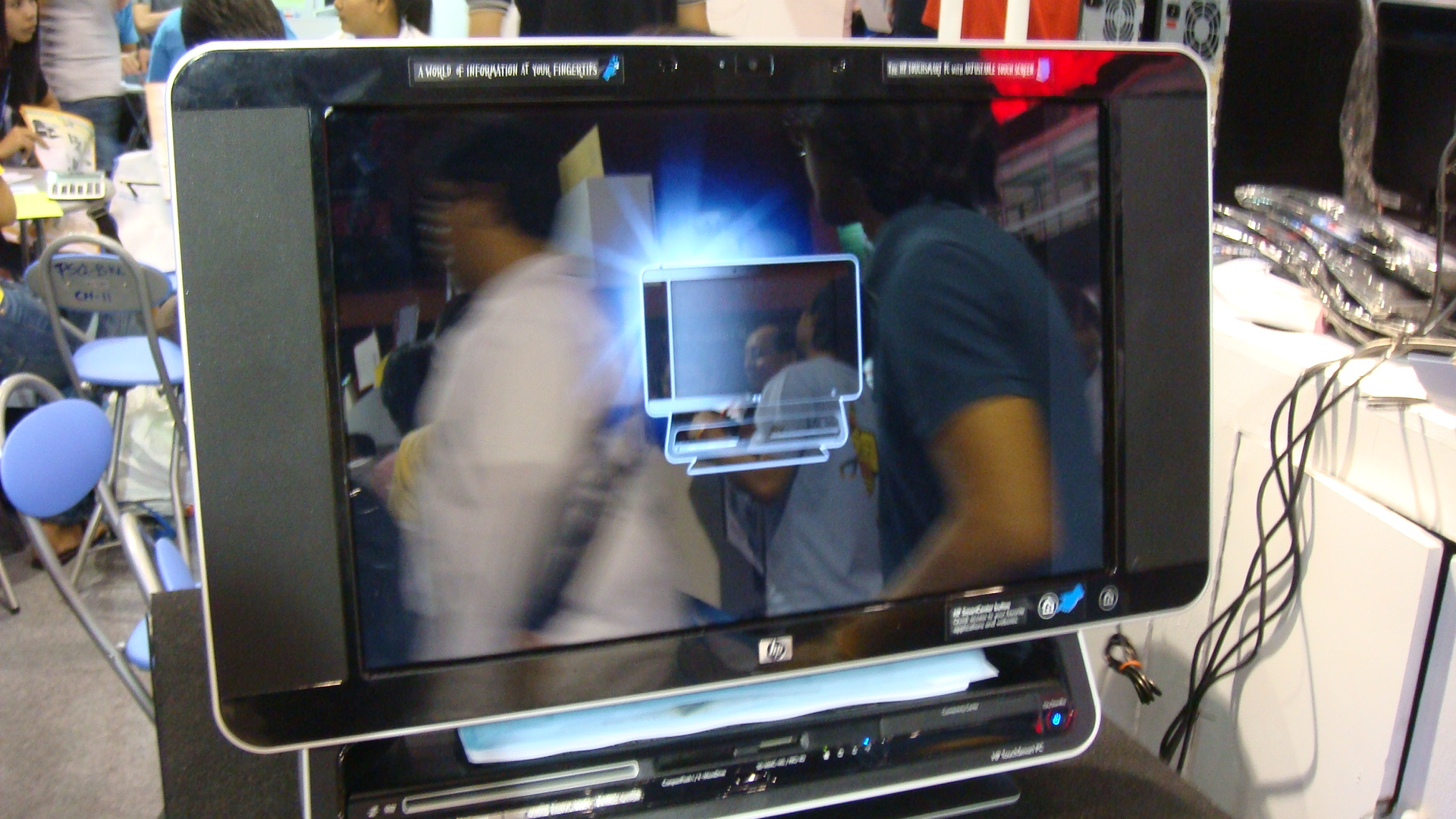
- HP TouchSmart IQ770
- Manufacturer: Hewlett-Packard
- Type: All-in-one
- Released: January 7, 2007; 19 years ago
- Operating system: Windows Vista Home Premium
- CPU: AMD Turion 64 X2 TL-52 processor
- Memory: 2 GB SDRAM
- Storage: 320 GB HDD
- Display: 19" Touchscreen
- Camera: Yes
- Connectivity: FM and ATSC HDTV tuners; Bluetooth, 802.11a/b/g wireless, and gigabit Ethernet connectivity
- Successor: HP TouchSmart IQ500

The HP TouchSmart was first introduced by Bill Gates on January 7, 2007, becoming the first mass market touchscreen desktop PC.

Also known as the "Crossfire", the HP TouchSmart IQ770 featured a 19-inch touchscreen, an AMD Turion 64 X2 TL-52 processor, NVIDIA GeForce Go 7600. It had a wide array of ports, including Ethernet, two FireWire, six USB 2.0 ports, one with HP printer power Y-cable connector, 5.1 + digital audio out, IR out, mini-VGA, FM coax, TV coax, ATSC, and two S-Video; however, the IQ770 did not have HDMI ports. PC World gave the machine a "very good" rating of 81/100, but noted that the use of mobile components slowed the computer.

==== HP TouchSmart 2 ====
On June 10, 2008, HP unveiled their new HP TouchSmart IQ500 series. The series featured a 22-inch widescreen touchscreen display, an Intel Core 2 Duo processor, a 500GB disk, 256MB NVIDIA GeForce 9300 M HS HD graphics, and 802.11n WiFi, along with an Energy Star qualification. The new TouchSmart featured a 2-inch profile in a piano-black finish.

The IQ500 series was followed by the IQ800 series, featuring a larger 25.5 inch touchscreen. Other features included a TV tuner with remote, integrated webcam, Bluetooth, HP Pocket Media drive bay and an ambient light to illuminate the keyboard. It featured a Core 2 Duo T6600, 4GB of RAM, a DVD drive, a 1TB HDD and no dedicated graphics chip as it used the Intel 4 series chipset. The more expensive IQ816 featured a 2.10 GHz T8100 Core 2 Duo on an 800 MHz bus with a 3MB cache, Blu-ray drive / dual-layer burner, and a GeForce 9600M GS chip. There is a choice of 640GB or 1TB hard drives.

==== TouchSmart 300 ====
The TouchSmart 300 was released on October 13, 2009. The all-in-one features an AMD Athlon II X2 235e (Energy Efficient) Processor Dual core @2.7 GHz. The platform is Regor and can be updated up to a Propus Quad Core AMD Athlon II X4 605e. Several models were released in different countries, but have similar features:

- 4GB RAM DDR3 PC-10600
- 500 GB HDD
- 20" Touchscreen (1440 x 900)
- Windows 7 Home Premium
- Wifi and Ethernet port
- ATSC TV Tuner

Touchsmart 300 with AMD Processors uses an integrated ATI HD 3200 graphics card with shared memory that can allocate 256MB to 1917MB of RAM dynamically (up to 3GB with the latest AMD Catalyst drivers 13.9 released in October 2013), it also has an MXM 3.0 Type-A slot for an external graphics card (integrated graphics card is disabled when MXM slot is populated), an [MXM] nVidia GeForce G210 card (with 512MB of DDR3 dedicated memory) can be installed using the proper thermal module.

Initially only rev. C2 quad core processors were supported, latest BIOS allows user to upgrade with rev. C3 processors (Athlon II X3 405e and Athlon II X4 605e). HP states in its support website that Touchsmart 300 RAM is upgradeable to 8GB RAM using 2 x 4gb modules but it's been proved it supports up to 16GB DDR3 PC-12800 (2 x 8GB) even if those are not recognized in the BIOS.

=== TouchSmart 500 ===
The TouchSmart 500 was a series of touchscreen PCs that featured the Windows Vista Home Premium and/or Windows 7 Home Premium Operating System. The computer featured a new tilt design that allowed it to be tilted up to 30 degrees backwards or forwards. The computer also featured an Intel Core 2 Duo T5850 (2.16 GHz), 4GB of RAM, and a 23" glossed sensitive touchscreen with a 358MB Intel GMA Mobile 965 GPU (before late 2009) or a Nvidia 9600M GS (after late 2009). The HP Touchsmart 520 featured in the series was one of the more powerful units, with an Intel i3 processor, 4GB of RAM, and a 1TB HDD. It also had a 23 inch glossy touchscreen.

==== TouchSmart 600 ====
HP TouchSmart 600
- Manufacturer: Hewlett Packard
- Type: All-in-one
- Released: October 13, 2009
- Introductory price: Starting at $1049
- Operating system: Windows 7 or Windows Vista
- CPU: Intel Core 2 Duo T5850 (2.16 GHz)/ T7450 (2.13 GHz)
- Memory: 4GB DDR3
- Storage: 500 GB/750 GB
- Display: 23"
- Camera: Yes
- Power: Energy Star
- Predecessor: HP TouchSmart IQ500/800
- Successor: HP TouchSmart 610/620

The TouchSmart 600 was released on October 13, 2009.

=== Business version ===
==== HP TouchSmart 9100 ====
The TouchSmart 9100 is a business oriented all-in-one PC that bears a strong Recording Assistant to its consumer counterpart, the TouchSmart 600.

== Tablet ==
=== TouchSmart tx2z ===
Released in December 2008, the TouchSmart tx2 was touted as the first consumer notebook and tablet PC with on-screen multi-touch control. The TouchSmart tx2 replaced the older HP Pavilion tx series.

=== TouchSmart tm2 ===
The HP TouchSmart tm2 is a convertible laptop, with a multi-touch touch-screen. Converted into slate mode, the tm2 allows artists to draw using the included digital pen and also allows students to take notes in classes.

=== TouchSmart Mini 5102 ===
HP's first touch-enabled netbook, enabling multitouch gestures and menus. It features an anodized aluminum case in black, red or blue and weighs 2.6 lbs. It offers face recognition for log-on to Windows 7. The series features Intel Atom N450 CPU, mobile broadband, HP video playback and 10-hour battery run time.

=== Slate ===
At CES 2010, in conjunction with Steve Ballmer, CEO of Microsoft, HP announced the Windows 7 HP Slate PC.

== See also ==
- Asus EEE Top
- Sony VAIO
