= Instant-on =

In computing, instant-on is the ability to boot nearly instantly, allowing to go online or to use a specific application without waiting for a PC's traditional operating system to launch. Instant-on technology is today mostly used on laptops, netbooks, and nettops because the user can boot up one program, instead of waiting for the PC's operating system to boot. This allows a user to launch a single program, such as a movie-playing program or a web browser, without the need of the whole operating system. There still remain a few true instant-on machines such as the Atari ST, as described in the Booting article. These machines had complete Operating Systems resident in ROM similar to the way in which the BIOS function is conventionally provided on current computer architectures. The "instant-on" concept as used here results from loading an OS, such as a legacy system DOS, with a small hard drive footprint. Latency inherent to mechanical drive performance can also be eliminated by using Live USB or Live SD flash memory to load systems at electronic speeds which are orders of magnitude faster.

== List of systems ==
- Acer InstaBoot Netbook (based on Splashtop)
- Acer RevoBoot Nettop (based on Splashtop)
- Asus Express Gate motherboards, notebooks, Eee Box (nettop), and EeePCs (based on Splashtop)
- Ubuntu Light
- Dell Latitude ON, Latitude On Reader (based on Splashtop), Latitude On Flash (based on Splashtop)
- Google ChromeOS
- HP QuickWeb Probook notebook (based on Splashtop)
- HP Instant On Solution Voodoo & Envy notebook (based on Splashtop)
- HP Instant Web netbook (based on Splashtop)
- Lenovo QuickStart (based on Splashtop)
- LG SmartOn (based on Splashtop)
- Mandriva InstantOn
- MSI Winki
- Palm Foleo
- Phoenix HyperSpace
- Sony Quick Web Access (based on Splashtop)
- Splashtop Inc. Splashtop
- Xandros Presto

== Timeline ==
- In October 2007, ASUS introduced an instant-on capability branded "Express Gate" on select motherboards, using DeviceVM's Splashtop software and dedicated flash memory.
- In May 2008, Asus shipping "Express Gate" based on Splashtop to its notebooks.
- In July 2008, HP started shipping Splashtop on its Voodoo notebooks, calling it "Instant On Solution (IOS)."
- In October 2008, Lenovo started shipping Splashtop on its netbooks, calling it "QuickStart."
- Dell Computer Corporation announced on 13 August 2008 that they would support "instant on" in their Latitude line of laptops, leveraging "a dedicated low-voltage sub-processor and OS that can enable multi-day battery life and which provides "near-instant access to e-mail, calendar, attachments, contacts and the Web without booting into the system’s main operating system (OS)..." This OS will be running a Linux variant.
- In January 2009, LG started shipping Splashtop on its netbooks, calling it "Smart On."
- In June 2009, Acer started using Splashtop on its netbook, calling it "RevoBoot."
- In June 2009, Sony started installing an instant-on browser-only version of Splashtop software on its Vaio NW laptops.
- In September 2009, HP announced that it will ship a number of netbooks and commercial notebooks with a "Quick Web" instant-on feature, which also utilizes Splashtop software.
- In September 2009, Asus shipped EeePC netbooks with "Express Gate," based on Splashtop.
- In October 2009, Samsung partnered with Phoenix Technologies to offer instant-on notebooks and netbooks.
- In November 2009, Dell shipped Latitude commercial notebooks, with Latitude On Reader and Latitude On Flash features, based on Splashtop.
- In November 2009, Google open source ChromeOS alpha.
- In November 2009, Acer shipped Splashtop on its Aspire One netbooks, called "InstaBoot."
- In December 2009, Mandriva published an Environment called "Mandriva InstantOn"
- By end of 2009, Splashtop has shipped on over 30 million PCs.
- In early 2010, Canonical, the sponsors for the Ubuntu Operating System, will have an instant-on proposition released to market. Information may be released at the CES show in Las Vegas, January 2010.
- In June 2010, HP buys Phoenix's HyperSpace.
- In 2010, DeviceVM projected Splashtop will ship on over 100 million PCs.
- In October 2010, Apple introduced the new MacBook Air as a next generation notebook that will use flash memory technology that enables the ability of instant-on.
- In February 2011, Splashtop OS released as a free download.

== Consumer electronics ==
In the past, consumer electronics manufacturers would emblazon radios and television sets with "Instant On" or "Instant Play" decals. In series filament sets, instant-on was accomplished by adding only a silicon diode across the power switch to keep tube filaments lit at 50% power; the diode was placed such that the typical half wave rectifier of the day was reverse-biased. Instant-on advantages included near-instant operation of the television or radio and potentially longer vacuum tube life; disadvantages included energy consumption and risk of fire. Most solid state consumer electronics are inherently instant-on, so the moniker survived into the early solid state era to differentiate a product from its vacuum-tube based brethren (with CRTs being a notable exception).

== See also ==
- Just enough operating system
- Windows Hotstart
- InstantGo
- Fast startup
