= Compaq tc1000 =

Laplet model designed by Compaq

Compaq TC-1000
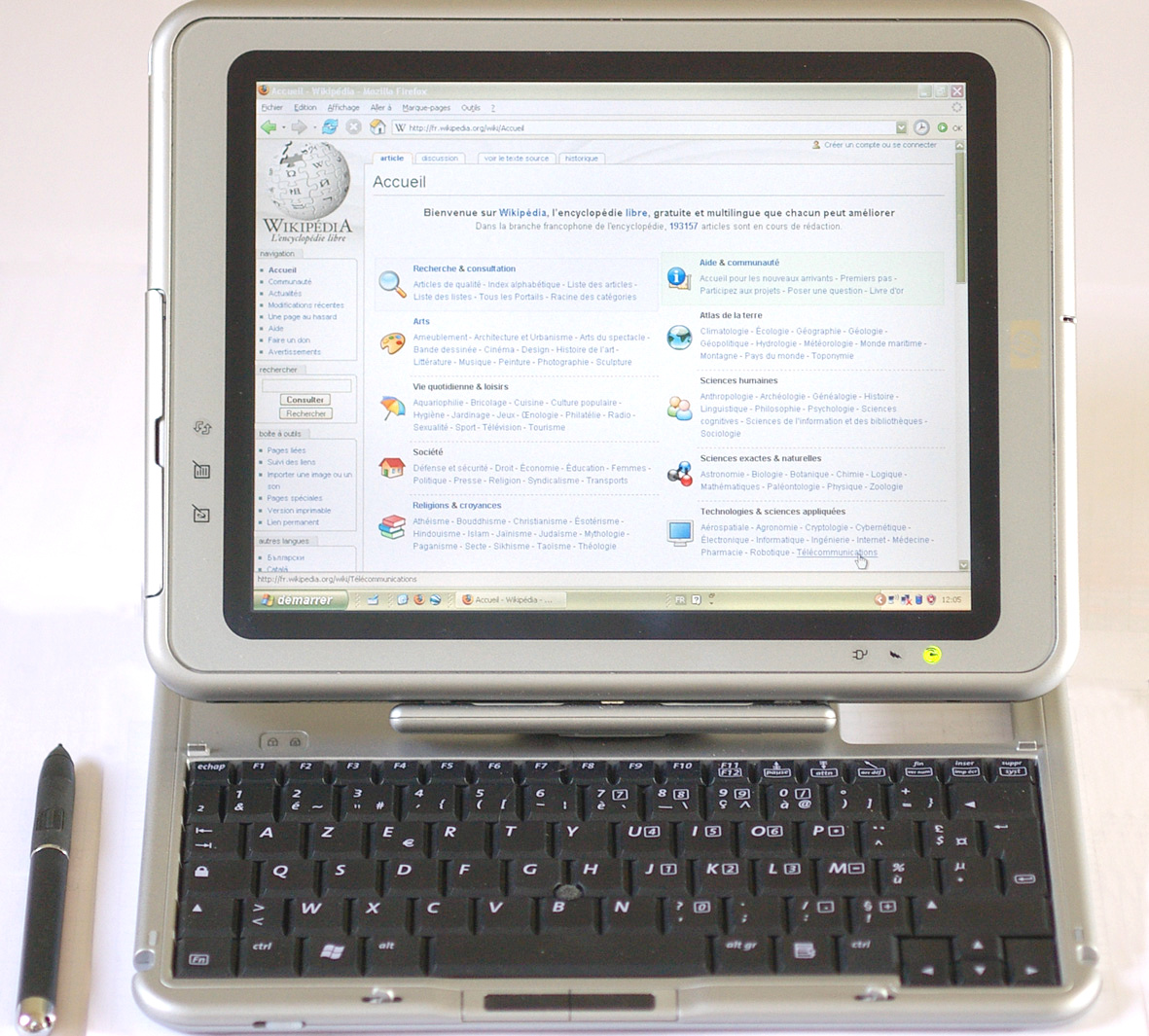
- TC1100 tablet - next model with same design, with HP logo instead of Compaq logo.
- Developer: Compaq
- Type: Laplet
- Released: 2003
- Operating system: Windows XP Tablet PC Edition
- CPU: Transmeta Crusoe 5800; 1.0 GHz, 512 KB Cache
- Memory: 256 MB (SDRAM)
- Storage: 30, 40, or 60 GB Hard Drive
- Display: 10.4 Inches 1024x768
- Graphics: Nvidia GeForce2Go (16 MB, SDRAM)
- Power: 40 Wh Li ion
- Dimensions: 10.8 in × 8.5 in × .8 in (274 mm × 216 mm × 20 mm)
- Weight: 3.1 lb (1.4 kg); 4 lb (1.8 kg) With Keyboard
- Successor: HP Compaq TC1100

The TC1000 is a 10.4" laplet designed by Compaq, before it was purchased by HP. It used the Transmeta Crusoe processor. Unlike many other tablet PCs of its time (which can only operate either in a traditional laptop configuration, or with the keyboard folded behind the screen), the display is fully detachable from the keyboard. The product was developed and manufactured using ODM model from LG Electronics, Inc. of South Korea.

The TC1000 was replaced by the HP Compaq TC1100 which features a faster Pentium M processor and an integrated digitizer from Wacom (the TC1000 used a Finepoint digitizer which required a AAAA battery and lacked pressure-input, being binary on/off only), among other small upgrades.

The TC1000 comes with Windows XP Tablet PC Edition but it is capable of running Linux.

A restore CD is available on the Internet Archive to restore the machine to its factory configuration.

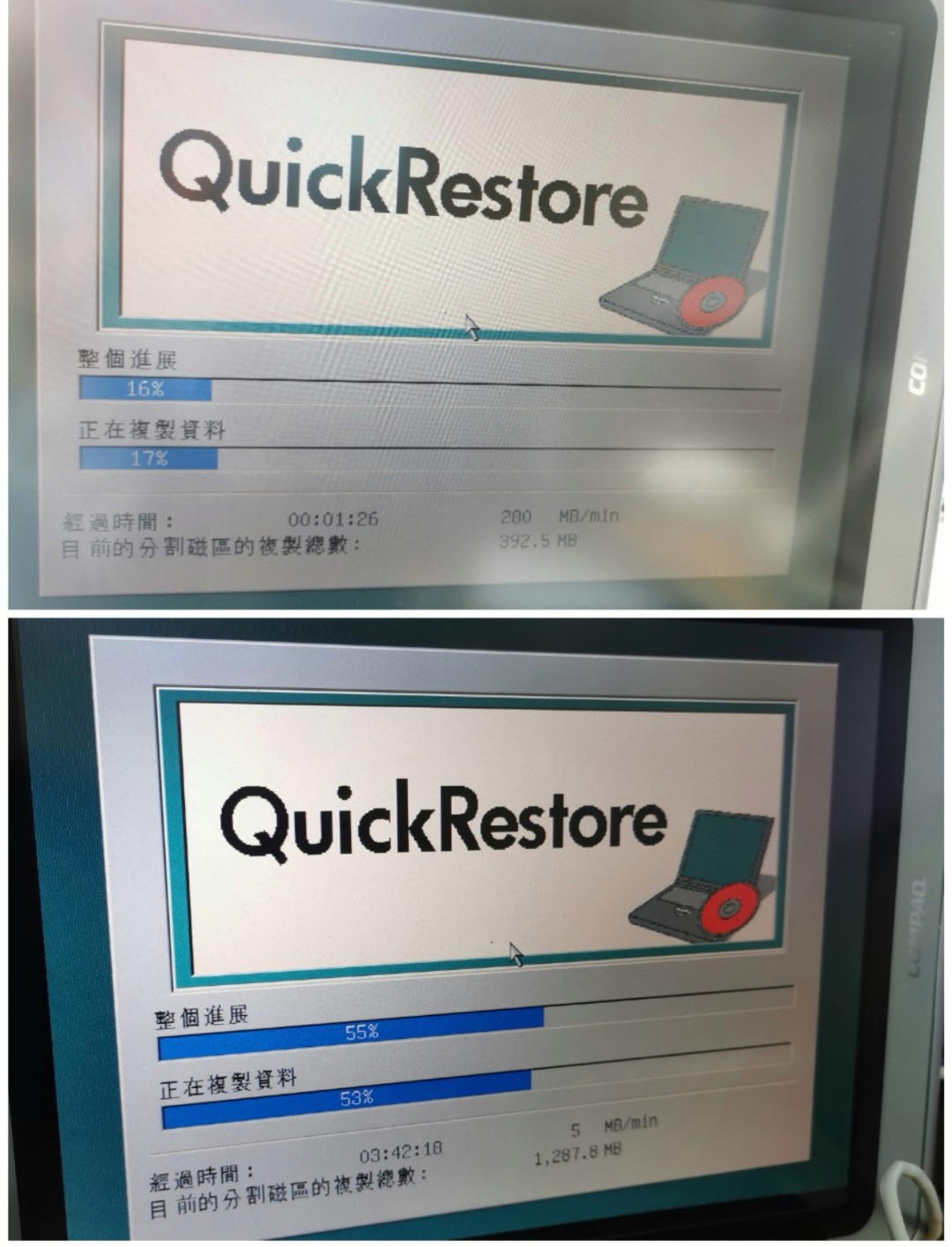
Compaq TC1000 running quick restore

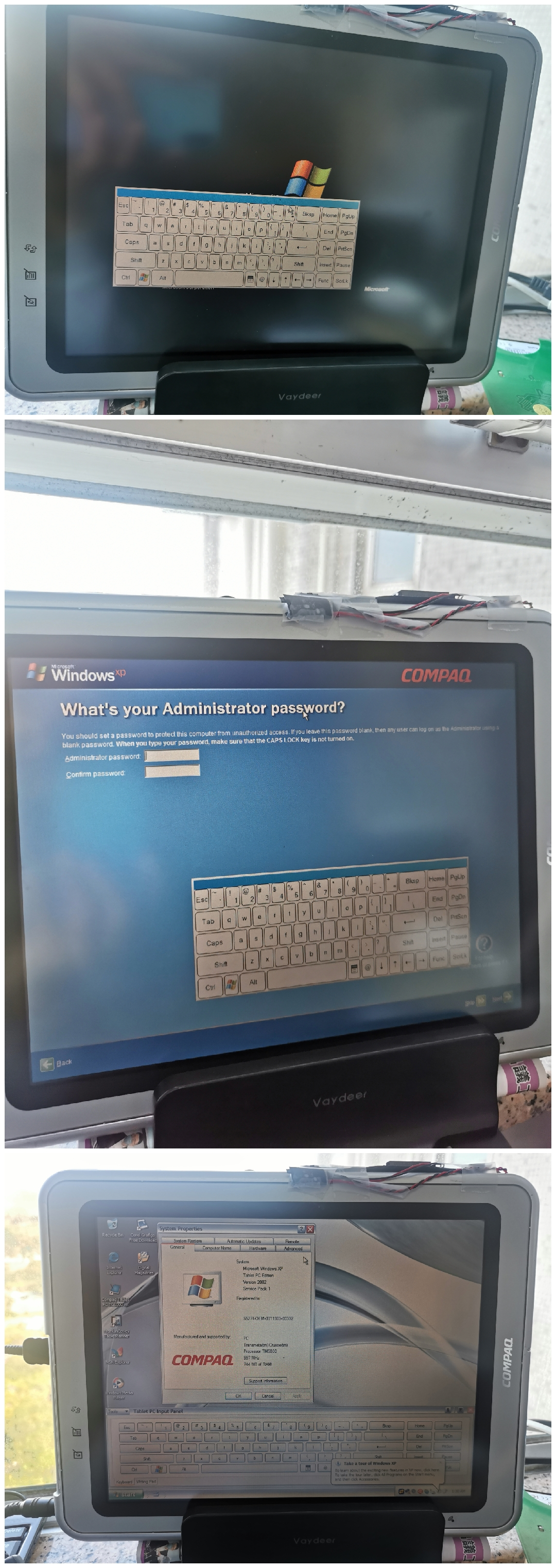
Compaq TC1000 setting up

== Design Awards ==
The TC1000 has won numerous industrial design awards. These include:

- 2003 IDEA Bronze Award
- 2003 IF Product Design Award
- 2003 ID Magazine Honorable Mention (http://www.idonline.com/)
- 2003 Good Design Award

== Reviews ==
Design and Form Factor: Reviewers from publications like theVooner adored the physical layout. It was celebrated as an early, ahead-of-its-time precursor to modern detachable tablets (like the Microsoft Surface).

Performance: The biggest point of failure was the use of a 1GHz Transmeta Crusoe TM5800 processor. Because the Crusoe chip relied on software emulation to execute x86 tasks, it fought with Windows XP Tablet PC Edition and digital inking for priority, grinding multitasking to a halt.

Screen and Stylus: While the 10.4-inch display was crisp, it utilized FinePoint digitizer with a scratch resistant glass surface. PC Mag review noted glass top lacked pressure sensitivity disappointing digital artists but handwriting recognition worked reasonably well.

C/Net Reviews were mixed and unfavorable reviews from PC Magazine.
