= Splashtop OS =

Linux distribution

Splashtop
- Developer: Splashtop Inc.
- OS family: Linux (Unix-like)
- Working state: Discontinued
- Source model: Closed source
- Initial release: October 30, 2007; 18 years ago
- Update method: Manual, via PC vendor
- Supported platforms: x86
- Kernel type: Monolithic (Linux)
- Default user interface: Blackbox
- License: Open source with some closed source components
- Official website: os.splashtop.com

Splashtop OS (previously known as SplashTop) is a discontinued Linux distribution intended to serve as an instant-on environment for personal computers. It is open source software with some closed source components. The original concept of Splashtop was that it was intended to be integrated on a read-only device and shipped with the hardware, rather than installed by the user. It did not prevent the installation of another operating system for dual booting. It was an instant-on commercial Linux distribution targeting PC motherboard vendors and other device manufacturers. The first OEM partner for the original Splashtop was ASUS, and their first joint product was called Express Gate. Later, other computer manufacturers also built Splashtop into certain models and re-branded it under different names. The aspects below detailing these events are retained verbatim from past articles, for historical reference.

It boots in about 5 seconds, and was thus marketed as "instant-on". It uses Bootsplash, SquashFS, Blackbox, SCIM, and the Linux kernel 2.6.

Support for Splashtop OS has been withdrawn and downloads of Splashtop OS have been disabled on the Splashtop website. Its popularity quickly declined after announcing an agreement with Microsoft and most vendors who included it eventually started using a version that required a Windows installation and later simply dropped it. Splashtop Inc. then focused on a remote desktop solution.

== Features ==
Splashtop features a graphical user interface, a web browser based on Mozilla Firefox 2.0 (later updated to Firefox 3.0), a Skype VoIP client, a chat client based on Pidgin, and a stripped-down file manager based on PCManFM. It also includes Adobe Flash Player 10.

Splashtop OS shipping in HP, Dell, Lenovo, Acer, and other OEMs was based on Mozilla-based web browser. Google declined to be the search engine as Google did not want to revenue share on search traffic with DeviceVM. Despite Splashtop OS is Linux based, Splashtop closed partnership with Yahoo! and Microsoft Bing as search engines. After assessing Splashtop OS technology, Google decided to launch its own ChromeOS and Chromebook. The online downloadable version of Splashtop OS (beta) version 0.9.8.1 uses Microsoft Bing as search engine, a Chromium-based web browser with Adobe Flash Player plug-in preinstalled. Existing Windows bookmarks and Wi-Fi settings can be imported from Windows.

Most versions of Asus motherboards no longer come with Splashtop preinstalled, as the manufacturer now limits the inclusion of its built-in Express Gate flash drive to "Premium" motherboards such as the P6T Deluxe and P7P55D-E Premium. Other Asus motherboards allow installation of the compact OS via a Windows-only based installer on its support CD. Installation from CD requires a Windows partition to store 500 MB of files, which has to be a SATA drive defined as IDE (no support for AHCI). If one doesn't have a Windows-based machine, it is possible to install Splashtop on a USB hard drive, from the sources.

As of June 2010, Splashtop, as supplied for Asus motherboards, had no support for add-on wireless hardware such as PCI cards.

== Internals ==
Splashtop can work with a 512 MB flash memory embedded on the PC motherboard. The flash memory can be also emulated on the Windows C: drive (see below). A proprietary core engine starts at the BIOS boot and loads a specialized Linux distribution called a Virtual Appliance Environment (VAE). While running this VAE, the user can launch Virtual Appliances (VA) or container. Skype is a VA or container, for instance.

The Sony VAIO versions such as 1.3.4.3 are installed as VAIO Quick Web Access. The installer and the resulting SquashFS files occupy roughly 2×250 MB. The SquashFS files consist of a hidden splash.idx and two hidden folders splash.sys and splash.000 in the Windows C:-partition, where splash.000 corresponds to splash.sys\persist for a DOS file system emulation of a USB flash drive. The MD5 checksums of the various bootsplash bs-xxxx.sqx and Virtual Appliance va-xxxx.sqx files (including a special Firefox configuration) are noted in splash.sys\version for a simple integrity check at the Splashtop start. VAIO laptops offer special buttons ASSIST, WEB, or VAIO depending on the model. The power button on these laptops triggers an ordinary PC boot process, the WEB button starts Splashtop. If a Windows-version configured for VAIO is already running the WEB button only starts the default browser.

The open sources used for major parts of different Splashtop versions can be downloaded. Parts of Splashtop are subject to patents.

DeviceVM owns various patents around instant-on techniques, including being the first OS to leverage on-board flash for enhanced performance, and intelligently cache hardware probing info so next boot will be faster. Many techniques are now incorporated by Microsoft and other modern OS for fast startup.

== Products using Splashtop ==
Asus distributed Splashtop in various motherboards and laptops, including select products from Eee family, under name "Express Gate". Splashtop was also available in netbooks and laptops from various vendors under names "Acer InstantView", "HP QuickWeb", "Dell Latitude On", "Lenovo Quick Start", "LG Smart On", "VAIO Quick Web Access" and "Voodoo IOS".

Total shipment achieved over 100 million computers annually by 2009.

== See also ==
- HyperSpace
- Latitude ON
- coreboot
- Extensible Firmware Interface
- Open Firmware
- OpenBIOS
