= HyperSpace (software) =

Operating system by Phoenix Technologies

- Developer: Phoenix Technologies
- OS family: Linux (Unix-like)
- Marketing target: Embedded systems
- Supported platforms: x86, ARM
- Kernel type: Monolithic (Linux)
- License: Proprietary

HyperSpace is an instant-on Linux-based operating system that has been developed by Phoenix Technologies. It is an application environment that can run either independently or side-by-side with a traditional operating system such as Microsoft Windows.

In January 2009, Asus announced HyperSpace would be incorporated into its next-generation notebooks. HyperSpace was re-launched at the 2009 Consumer Electronics Show. The company later announced that HyperSpace has been optimized for the Cortex-A8 ARM processor architecture.

In June 2010, Phoenix announced that it had sold the HyperSpace intellectual property to HP.

== Overview ==
HyperSpace provided a Linux-based environment that can be accessed from startup or using a shortcut from within a Windows environment. Its user interface features a home screen with access to widgets and applications (including a Mozilla Firefox-derived web browser, an office suite, and RealPlayer among others). Phoenix claimed that HyperSpace could extend a notebook's battery life by 25%.

There were three SKUs of HyperSpace:

- HyperSpace Dual installs the software in a traditional dual-boot configuration, where the two operating systems cannot operate simultaneously.
- HyperSpace Hybrid configures the system to run Windows and HyperSpace within the "HyperCore" hypervisor, allowing the two environments to operate concurrently, and for users to switch between them instantly. Hybrid required a system supporting Intel virtualization extensions (VT-x).
- HyperSpace Dual Resume utilizes non-standard ACPI behavior in order to allow for both operating systems to be resident in memory without a hypervisor, although only one OS can operate at a time. At startup, a bootloader reserves a segment of memory for HyperSpace and the "OS Steering Module" (OSM, which is derived from the GNU GRUB bootloader), and a larger segment is reserved for Windows. When the user switches operating systems, the existing OS is suspended to RAM by entering ACPI standby (S3) mode, but the OSM then intercepts and modifies the ACPI tables so that the second OS is loaded in the second reserved segment of memory, while keeping the first OS resident in memory.

HyperSpace is stored in a hidden partition; the Windows partition is mounted read-only using the NTFS-3G driver, but a UnionFS overlay is applied to the My Documents folder for partial read-write access. When the user resumes Windows from HyperSpace, a device driver reads changes to the filesystem via a journal, and commits them to disk.

Phoenix offered HyperSpace as subscription-based software, and also partnered with OEMs such as Asus, Gigabyte, and Samsung Electronics to offer the software for their devices.

== See also ==
- Splashtop
- Latitude ON
- Coreboot
