= Microsoft Tablet PC =

Microsoft's former line of tablets

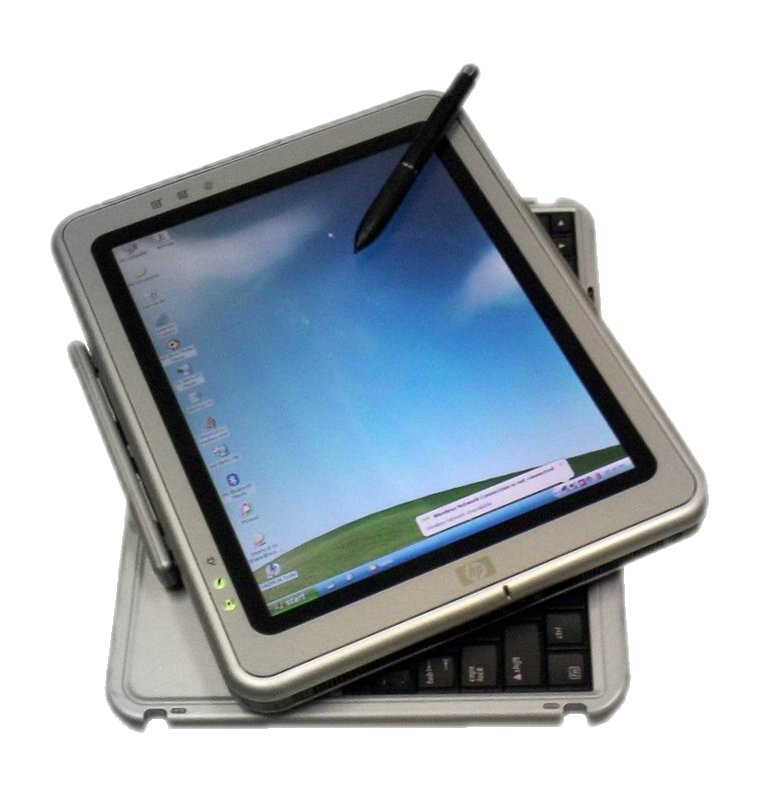
An HP tablet released in 2003

Microsoft Tablet PC is a term coined by Microsoft for tablet computers conforming to a hardware specification the company announced in 2001 for a pen-enabled personal computer running Windows XP Tablet PC Edition or a later version of Microsoft Windows with tablet support.

Original equipment manufacturers released the first Tablet PCs in 2003, running Windows XP Tablet PC Edition. Microsoft built pen and tablet support directly into later versions of Windows, beginning with Windows Vista and Windows 7, so that no separate tablet edition was required. The company's later tablet efforts included the UMPC in 2006, the Slate PC in 2010, and the Microsoft Surface line from 2012.

== History ==
In 2003, original equipment manufacturers released the first tablet PCs built to the Microsoft Tablet PC specification, running Windows XP Tablet PC Edition, the tablet version of Windows XP. This edition superseded Microsoft's earlier pen-computing environment, Windows for Pen Computing 2.0. Microsoft designed the later desktop versions of Windows, Windows Vista and Windows 7, to support pen computing without a separate edition. An early Tablet PC running Windows XP shipped with 128 megabytes of RAM, a 600 megahertz processor, and 10 gigabytes of storage.

Microsoft demonstrated a Tablet PC prototype at Comdex in late 2001, with hardware from Acer, Compaq, Fujitsu, and Toshiba, and showed production designs from Fujitsu, Motion Computing, and Toshiba at TechXNY in June 2002. Early Tablet PCs typically cost US$2,000 or more. A 2011 Computerworld retrospective attributed their limited consumer uptake to that price and to a heavy reliance on the stylus, which kept them from displacing laptops before Apple's iPad.

Microsoft Tablet PCs were pen-based x86 PCs with handwriting and voice recognition. They used the same hardware as contemporary laptops but added support for pen input, for which Microsoft released Windows XP Tablet PC Edition. Windows Vista and Windows 7 instead built tablet support into their Home and Business editions, adding touchscreen mouse input, handwriting recognition, and gesture support. Microsoft announced the UMPC initiative, developed under the code name Project Origami, in 2006; it defined a smaller tablet with a touch-sensitive 7-inch screen running Windows XP Tablet PC Edition 2005, and Samsung shipped the first model, the Q1. A 2007 update based on Windows Vista, the Origami Experience, replaced the standard Windows shell with a media browser designed for these devices. Microsoft relaunched the concept as Slate PC in 2010 for tablets running Windows 7.

As many manufacturers adopted the ARM architecture with lighter operating systems, Microsoft followed in 2012 with Surface and Windows RT, while targeting the smartphone market separately with Windows Phone 8. Later Windows tablets included the Surface line, which ran Windows RT and subsequently Windows 8.1, and the x86 and ARM versions of Windows 10 and 11.

== Configurations ==
Tablet PCs were made in several form factors.

=== Slate ===
Slates are tablets without a dedicated keyboard, the most common form factor. For text input, users rely on handwriting recognition through an active digitizer, an on-screen keyboard, or an external keyboard attached over a Wireless or USB connection.

=== Convertible ===
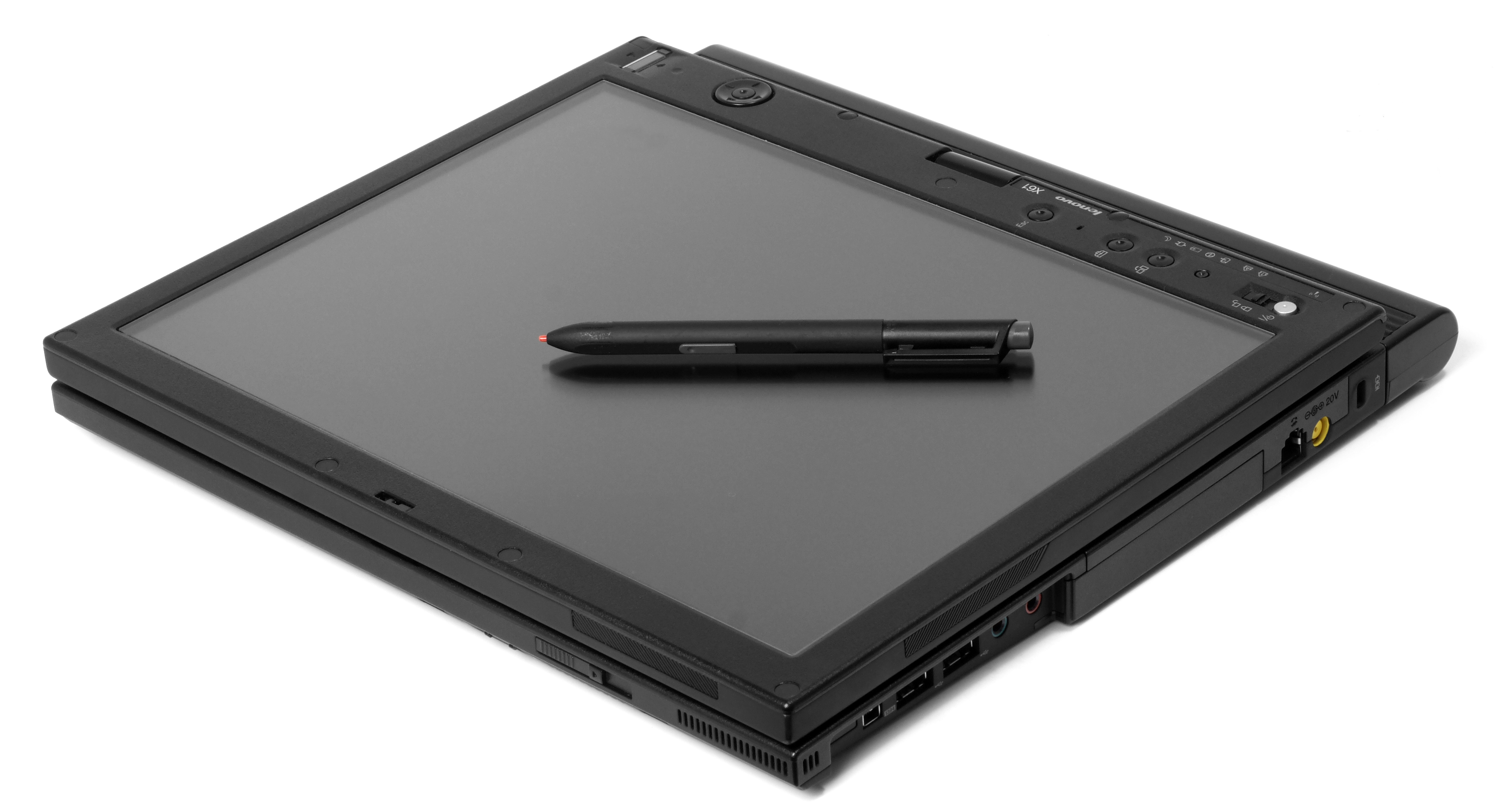
A Lenovo ThinkPad X61 Tablet in slate mode

Convertibles have a base with an integrated keyboard and resemble laptops. The display rotates about 180° on a hinge and folds down over the keyboard, screen facing up, to form a flat writing surface. They are usually heavier than slates but keep the keyboard and pointing device of a conventional notebook.

=== Hybrid ===
Hybrids resemble a notebook but have a detachable display that functions on its own as a slate. Examples include the HP/Compaq TC1000 and TC1100 series, the Microsoft Surface, and the Fujitsu Stylistic.

=== Booklet ===
Booklet PCs use two touchscreens joined by a hinge, folding shut like a book. Toshiba's Libretto W100, shown in 2010, paired two 7-inch multi-touch screens.

== System software ==
Windows 7 touch capability resembles Microsoft PixelSense (formerly Microsoft Surface), a gesture- and touch-centric interface that works with most touch computers. Windows tablet support began with Windows XP Tablet PC Edition, a superset of Windows XP Professional that added tablet functionality, including the Tablet PC Input Panel and drivers for tablet-specific hardware. Installing Tablet PC Edition required a tablet digitizer or touchscreen and hardware control buttons, among them a Ctrl-Alt-Delete button, scrolling buttons, and at least one user-configurable application button.

Service Pack 2 for Windows XP included Tablet PC Edition 2005 as a free upgrade. It improved handwriting recognition and extended the Input Panel to work in almost every application, including speech recognition input and correction.

With Windows Vista, tablet functionality no longer required a separate edition. Vista included tablet support in every edition except Home Basic and Starter, extending handwriting recognition, ink collection, and other input methods to any computer running Vista, whether the input came from an external digitizer, a touchscreen, or a mouse. Vista also added multi-touch functions and gestures and improved handwriting recognition with a personalization tool and an automatic learning tool.

Windows 7 included tablet functionality in every edition except Starter. It added a Math Input Panel that recognized handwritten mathematical expressions and integrated with other programs, and it improved pen input and handwriting recognition with faster and more accurate processing and support for more languages, including East Asian writing systems. Custom dictionaries aided recognition of specialized vocabulary, and text prediction sped up note-taking. Some Tablet PCs also supported multi-touch, allowing interaction through touch gestures in the same way as a mouse. Touch-screen drivers that a system recognized as PS/2 mouse input rather than a touch device could leave tablet functions unavailable or limited.

== Windows applications ==
Applications written for the Tablet PC used a pen-friendly interface or allowed handwriting directly in the document. Microsoft bundled several with the platform. The Experience Pack added Ink Desktop, which let the user write on the desktop; the Snipping Tool; Ink Art, a version of ArtRage; Ink Crossword; and a media-synchronization utility. The Education Pack added Ink Flash Cards, Equation Writer, GoBinder Lite, and a tablet-enabled version of Hexic Deluxe. The Windows 7 Touch Pack added games and programs for multi-touch input, including Microsoft Blackboard, Garden Pond, Rebound, Surface Globe, Surface Collage, and Surface Lagoon.

Notable software for the platform included Microsoft Windows Journal, Microsoft OneNote, Evernote, applications from GO Corporation, and Microsoft Research's InkSeine prototype interface.

== Features ==
Beyond the features of regular laptops, tablet PCs could add:

- Capacitive touch sensing, which detects fingers on the screen without firm pressure.
- Palm recognition, which prevents inadvertent contact from disrupting pen input.
- Multi-touch input, which recognizes several simultaneous finger touches for manipulating on-screen objects.

== See also ==
- History of tablet computers
- Comparison of tablet computers
- Pocket PC
