= Dell MediaDirect =

- Dell MediaDirect version 4.7 running on Windows Vista.
- Developer: Cyberlink
- Stable release: 4.7
- Operating system: Microsoft Windows
- Type: Multimedia Software
- License: Licensed to Dell by CyberLink
- Website: http://www.dell.com/

Dell MediaDirect is a software application that is published by Dell, Inc. and is pre-installed on the computers they sell. It attempts to provide DVD and CD playback and recent editions include features such as an address book and calendar. It is a custom version of CyberLink PowerCinema developed and licensed to Dell by CyberLink. MediaDirect works in conjunction with the operating system and the Dell QuickSet application.

== Design controversy ==
Earlier versions of MediaDirect attracted criticism since they adopt a distinctive combination of BIOS and hard drive layout to bypass the installed OS and boot directly to the media player application using a single button press.

The chosen approach causes disk geometry to be deliberately misreported, can prevent the successful backup of hard disks and may trigger catastrophic data loss when MediaDirect is launched.

Unless the drive and all pre-existing operating systems are left as originally installed, MediaDirect can trigger a forced repartitioning of the drive whilst attempting to load. This intervention typically causes the loss of all operating systems and data on the device. Removing or disabling the application is challenging because Dell employs Host protected area technology to cloak the location of the partition containing the software, contributing to the misreported disk geometry.

== Versions ==
=== Version 4 ===
Version 4 deletes the dual-boot "fast start" capability and associated disk partition. It is now installed as a standard application. MediaDirect 4 includes optimisations for multi-media playback and is primarily used to support Blu-ray drives.

=== Version 3 ===
Version 3.5 is compatible with Microsoft Windows XP and Vista (it also works on Windows 7 and Windows 8.1). Each version has separate editions that can only be installed on certain computer models. This is achieved by using folder and file names in the installation software that matches the BIOS SystemID.

- XPS M1330
- XPS M1530
- MXG071 - XPSM1730

Version 3.3 is compatible with Microsoft Windows XP and Vista (it also works on Windows 7 and Windows 8.1). Each version has separate editions that can only be installed on certain computer models. This is achieved by using folder and file names in the installation software that matches the BIOS SystemID.

- MXC061 - Inspiron 640M
- MM061 - Inspiron 6400/E1505
- MP061 - Inspiron 9400/E1705
- MXC062 - XPS M1210
- MXG061 - XPS M1710
- MXP061 - XPS M2010

Version 3 has a dual-boot option where the software can utilize a minimal load of the operating system which speeds boot time and simplifies operation.

=== Version 1.1 ===
Released Sep. 1, 2005, is compatible with Microsoft Windows XP and the following Dell systems:

- Inspiron 6000
- XPS/Inspiron XPS Gen 2
- Inspiron 9300
- XPS/Inspiron M170
- Inspiron 1720

== More information ==
- Understanding the Dell Media Direct Partition
- Dell Media Direct Destroys Partitions?, Dell Direct Media Nuked my System
- Dell MediaDirect 4.0 Frequently Asked Questions (FAQ)
- How to Reinstall MediaDirect 3.0 or 3.3
- How to Install Dell MediaDirect 2.0
- Download / How to Install MediaDirect 1.1
- CyberLink PowerCinema Linux
