= Ultra-low-cost personal computer =

An ultra-low-cost personal computer (ULCPC) is an inexpensive personal computer such as a netbook or a nettop. The term was most often used by Microsoft to define a class of computers that were eligible for special licensing and discounts. For example, the availability of Windows XP was extended and discounts were offered for ULCPCs. Microsoft has relaxed the definition to include larger displays (up to 14.1") and touchscreens. Windows support for ULCPC's ended on June 30, 2010. They no longer use the term or distinguish ULCPCs as a distinct category of computer.
