= CyberLink =

Taiwanese software company

CyberLink Corp.
- Native name: 訊連科技股份有限公司
- Type: Public
- Traded as: TWSE: 5203
- Industry: Computer software
- Founded: 1996; 30 years ago
- Headquarters: Xindian District, New Taipei, Taiwan
- Key people: Jau Huang (Chairman and CEO); Mei Guu (President); Vincent Lin (President); Hilda Peng
- Revenue: NT$1.89 billion
- Number of employees: 533 (2026)
- Website: www.cyberlink.com

CyberLink Corp. (Chinese: 訊連科技股份有限公司; pinyin: Xùnlián Kējì Gǔfèn Yǒuxiàn Gōngsī) is a Taiwanese multimedia software company headquartered in New Taipei City, Taiwan. Its products include PC and mobile applications for playback of movies and media, editing of videos and photos, and disc burning and backup solutions.

The company has regional offices in the United States, the Netherlands, and Japan.

== History ==
Founded in 1996, CyberLink Corp. creates multimedia software and AI facial recognition technology. The company developed and owns over 200 patented technologies.

CyberLink's headquarters and research facilities are located in Taipei, Taiwan. Regional offices cover operations in North America, Japan, Europe, and Asia-Pacific.

== Products ==
=== Media creation ===
- PowerDirector – Video editing software, was first released in 2001
- PhotoDirector – Photo editing software
- AudioDirector – Audio editing software, audio restoration and repair
- ColorDirector – Color grading software
- Director Suite – CyberLink first released its Director Suite of creative software in 2011. It includes PowerDirector, PhotoDirector, AudioDirector, and ColorDirector in a single package.
- CyberLink Media Suite – A multimedia software package including media player PowerDVD, video editing software PowerDirector, photo editing software PhotoDirector, disc burning utility Power2Go, and media conversion utility MediaEspresso
- ActionDirector – Video editing software designed for quick editing of footage taken with action cameras
- MakeupDirector – Digital makeup software to enhance makeup design for makeup artists, portrait photographers, and beauty enthusiasts

=== Media entertainment ===
- PowerCinema - A media player for TV, Radio and local files similar to Windows Media Center and geared towards HTPC.
- PowerDVD – A universal media player for movie discs, video files, photos, and music. In 2016, PowerDVD achieved certification from the Blu-ray Disc Association (BDA) for the playback of Ultra HD Blu-ray Discs, and became the first software player to pass the BD-ROM 4.0 PC Application Software License process.
- MediaShow – Image organiser and viewer
- MediaEspresso – Converts videos, photos, and music to a wide range of formats for playback on popular media players and mobile devices

=== Web camera apps ===
- YouCam – Webcam and camera app
- PerfectCam – AR makeup app for PC webcam

=== Disc burning and authoring ===
- Power2Go – Disc burning and optical disc authoring software
- PowerProducer – DVD authoring software

=== Business communication ===
- U Messenger – Instant Messenger
- U Meeting – Video conferencing and meeting
- U Webinar – Remote presentation and webinar

=== Facial recognition and AI ===
- FaceMe – Facial recognition engine

Ranked as one of the best in the NIST Face Recognition Vendor Test (VISA and WILD tests) with up to 99.7% accuracy rate.

=== Mobile apps ===
CyberLink released its first mobile app, MediaStory, in 2010. Since then, the company has introduced another 14 apps on Android, iOS, and Windows mobile platforms, including PhotoDirector and PowerDirector. CyberLink spun off its beauty products to a sister company named Perfect Corp. in June 2015.

- PowerDirector
- PhotoDirector
- ActionDirector
- YouCam Snap
- Power Media Player
- PowerDVD Remote
- YouNote
- AudioClipper
- ImageChef

=== Online tools ===
- MyEdit (launched in 2022) – A browser-based content creation platform offering AI-powered image, video, and audio editing tools. Leveraging CyberLink's multimedia software infrastructure, the service integrates generative AI models to provide features such as text-to-video, image-to-video, and video-to-anime generation. Additional capabilities include AI image generation, background removal, image-to-image transformations, and sound effect creation. Operating under a freemium model, the platform receives regular updates and supports multiple language interfaces to serve a global user base.

== 2023 Security Breach ==
In late October 2023, Cyber Link was remotely infiltrated by Lazarus Group (aka Diamond Sleet). The attackers were able to steal a software signing key and insert the malware "LambLoad" into authentically signed copies of CyberLinks software updates. The full extent of the damage caused by the resulting supply chain attack has yet to be determined.

== See also ==
- List of companies of Taiwan
