= HP Compaq tc1100 =

2004 tablet computer by Hewlett-Packard

HP Compaq TC-1100
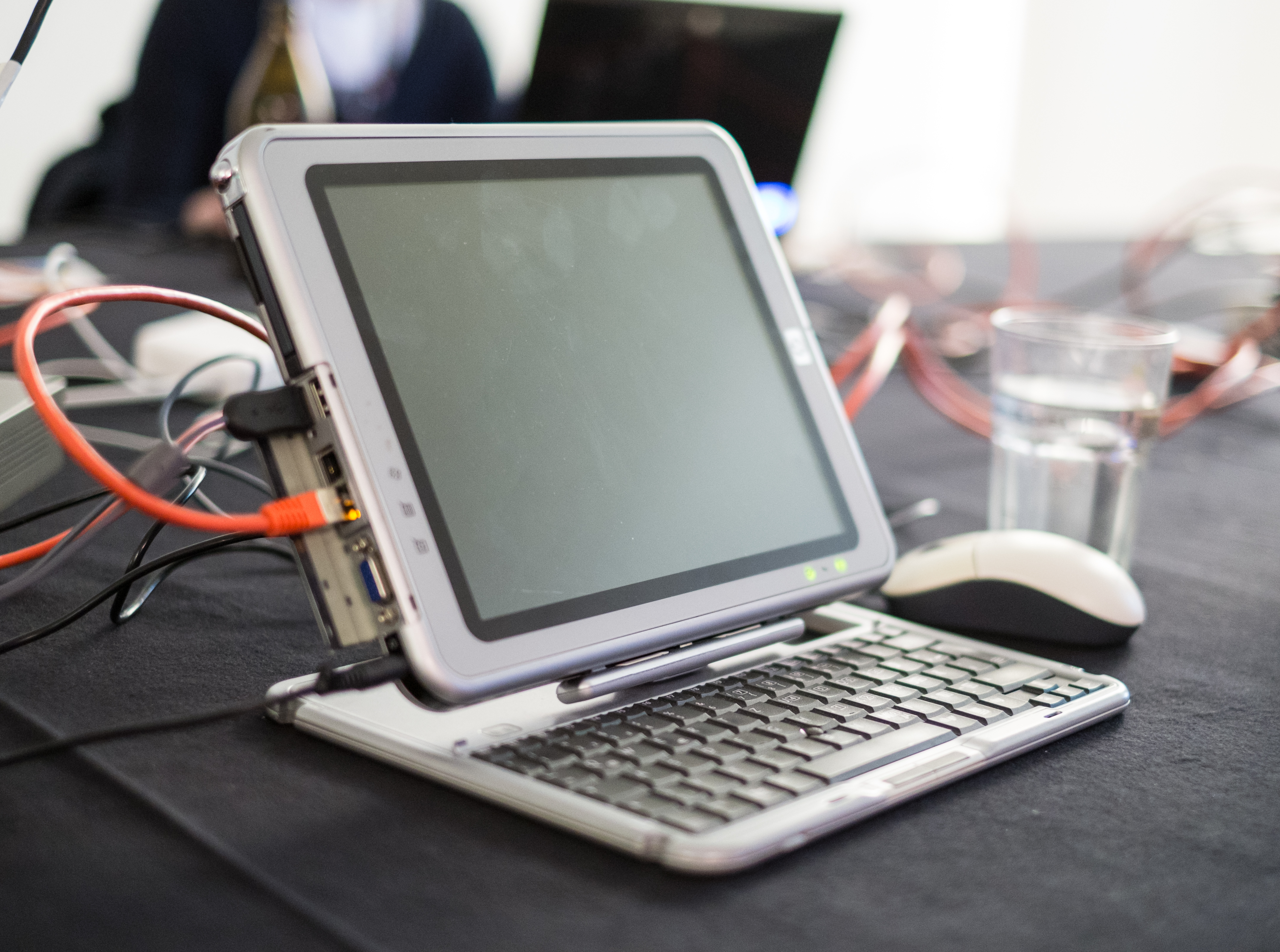
- TC1100 unfolded with keyboard attached
- Developer: Compaq, Hewlett-Packard
- Type: Laplet
- Released: 2004
- Operating system: Windows XP Tablet PC Edition 2005
- CPU: BGA soldered Intel Pentium M 753 ULV; 1.2 GHz, 2 MB cache Intel Pentium M 733 ULV; 1.1 GHz, 2 MB cache Intel Pentium M 723 ULV; 1.0 GHz, 1 MB cache Intel Celeron M 353 ULV; 900 MHz, 512 KB cache
- Memory: Standard 256 or 512 MB; Max 2 GB (2 modules) (333 MHz DDR-RAM)
- Storage: Parallel ATA 40, or 60 GB Hard Drive, no LBA48 support
- Display: 10.4 Inches 1024x768
- Graphics: NVIDIA GeForce 4 Go 420 (32 MB)
- Power: 40 Wh Li ion battery
- Dimensions: 10.8 in × 8.5 in × .8 in (27.4 cm × 21.6 cm × 2.0 cm)
- Weight: 3.1 lb (1.4 kg); 4 lb (1.8 kg) with keyboard
- Predecessor: Compaq tc1000
- Successor: HP Compaq tc4200

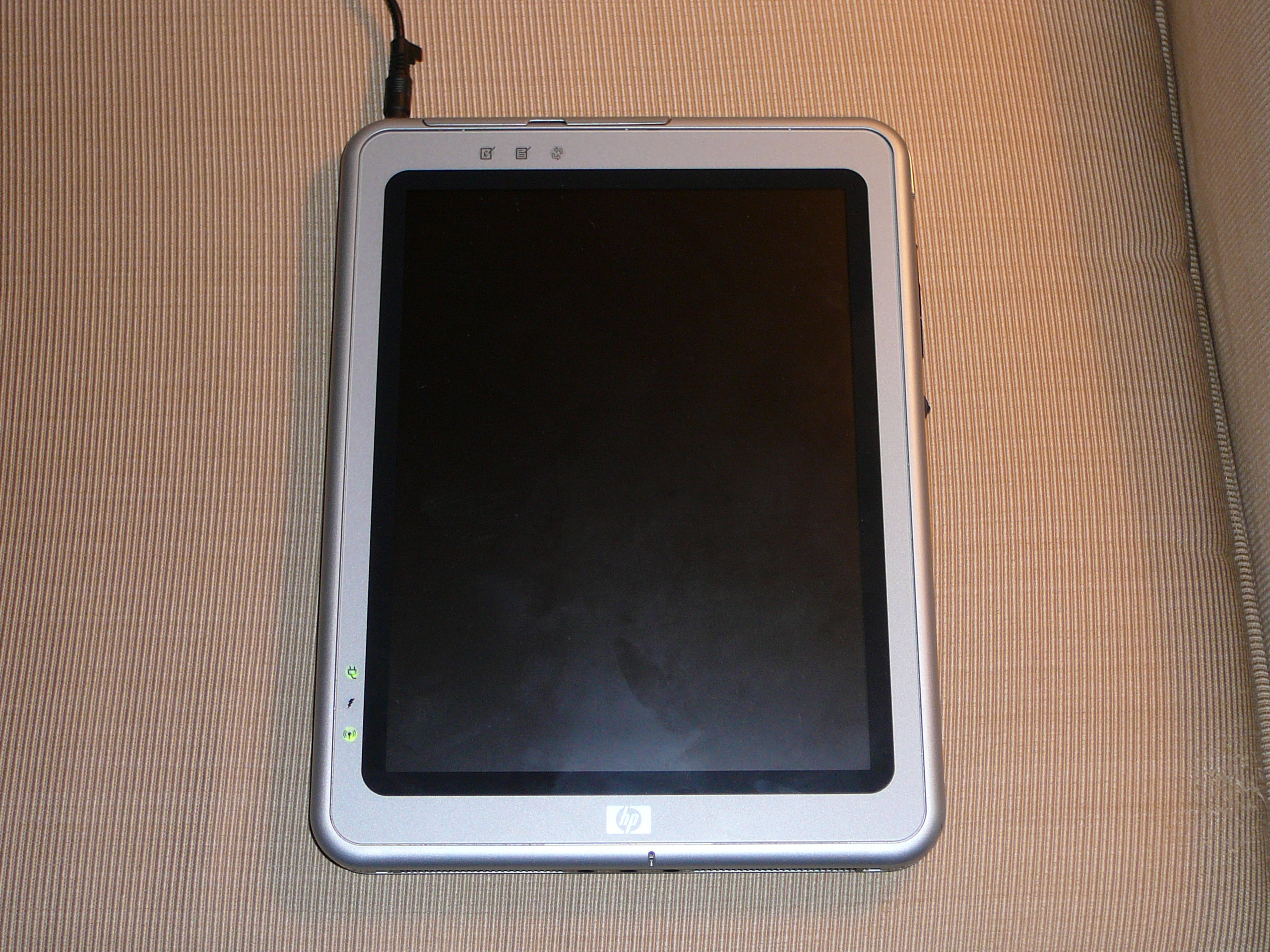
TC1100 in slate mode with the keyboard removed

The HP Compaq TC1100 is a tablet PC sold by Hewlett-Packard that was the follow-up to the Compaq TC1000. The TC1100 had either an Intel Celeron or an Intel Pentium M chip set and could be upgraded up to 2 gigabytes of memory. The switch from Transmeta Crusoe processors to the Pentium M and the ability to add memory came after numerous complaints about the poor performance of the TC1000. The TC1100 was the last version from HP in the two-piece tablet style. It was replaced by the HP Compaq TC4200, which featured a more traditional one-piece design.

== Design ==
The TC1100 has a 10.4 inch LCD and pressure-sensitive pen that shares the same basic design as its predecessor, the TC1000. It has a design often referred to as a hybrid tablet, as it has the properties of both a convertible and slate tablet. All the necessary hardware components are stored within the casing of the display and digitizer. This allows it to work with or without a keyboard attached. With the keyboard attached, it can be used as a laptop, with the display rising by an adjustable hinge behind the keyboard. By rotating the display, the keyboard can fold inside the unit; or the keyboard can be removed entirely. Either method lets the user write on the screen easily, using a virtual keyboard or handwriting-recognition application for occasional character entry. This versatility gave the product a loyal following when there were no similar designs on the market.

HP also made an optional docking station, which connected to the port on the bottom of the tablet, which allowed the user to easily connect their tablet to charge, while also offering a VGA output, an Ethernet jack, audio input and output jacks, 4 USB 2.0 ports and a laptop-style CD/DVD drive. All of the ports, excluding the USB ports, are shared with the ones on the tablet, the audio ports having priority over the ones on the right side of the tablet.

== Hardware ==
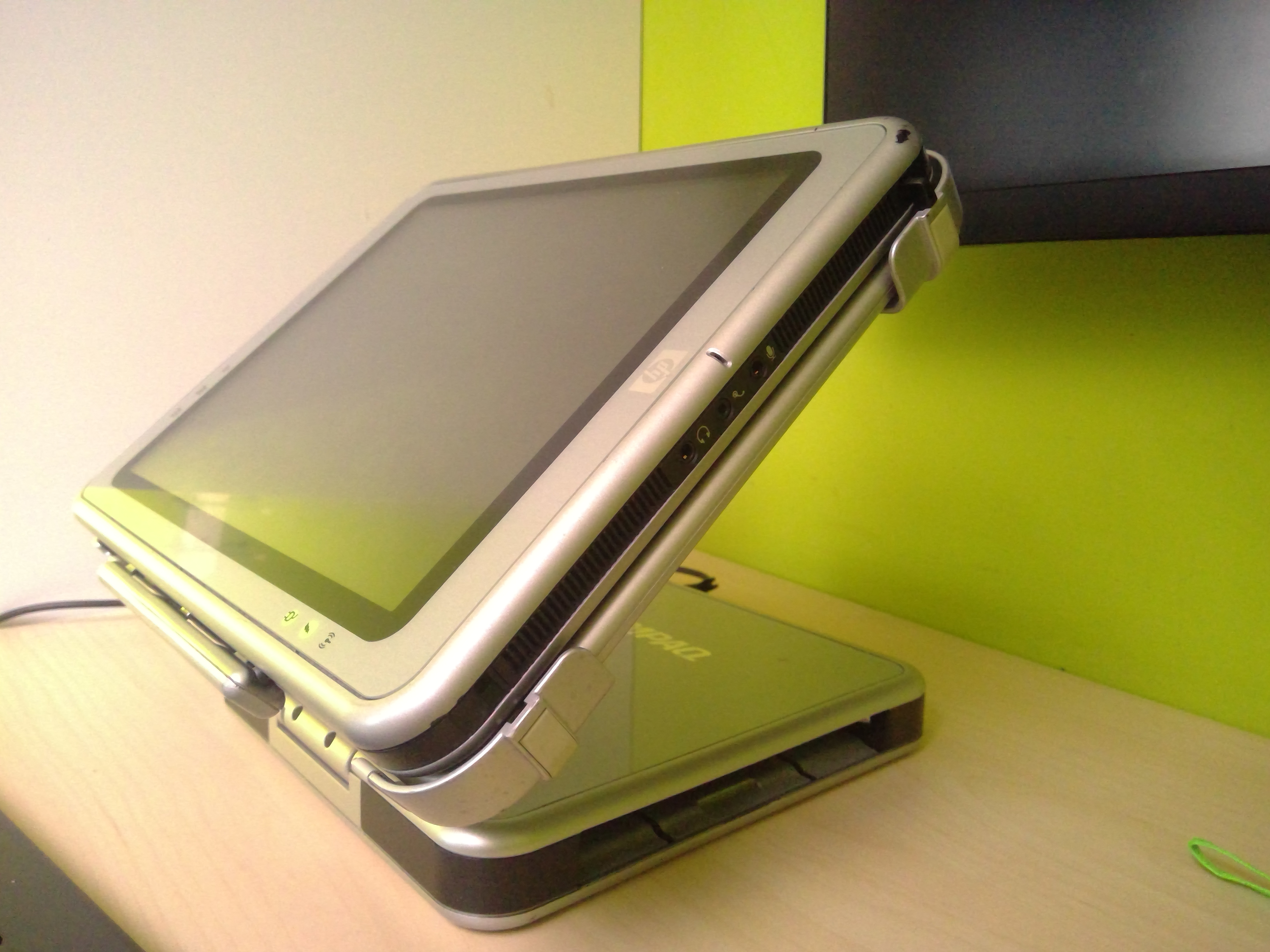
TC1100 docked in the docking station

The range of processors includes Pentium-M 1.0 GHz, 1.1 GHz, and 1.2 GHz. The high-end model features the 1.2 GHz Intel Pentium M 753 Ultra Low Voltage processor (1.20 GHz, 2 MB L2 cache, 400 MHz FSB), 60 GB hard drive, 512 MB (333 MHz) of installed RAM (2 GB max), 54g Wi-Fi connectivity (802.11b/g), Bluetooth wireless connectivity, Secure Digital memory card slot, and the Windows XP Tablet PC Edition operating system.

The processor was paired with a NVIDIA Geforce 4 Go 420 graphics chip, with 32 MB of RAM, OpenGL and DirectX 7 support.

The TC1100 allows for easy access to its memory, hard drive, and wireless card through screw-on covers on the rear of the screen unit. The installed memory is either 256 MB or 512 MB and can be upgraded to 2 GB. The hard drive is also easily upgradeable. Most 2.5-inch IDE hard drives are compatible with it, but the tablet only addresses up to 137 GB, due to a lack of LBA48 support. A wireless card can be installed on units not shipped with one, but some of these did not have the antenna installed either. A BIOS whitelist prevents users from installing third-party wireless cards which were not certified, sold and branded by HP. However, by flashing a modded BIOS, this limitation can be removed at one's own risk.

The tablet offers very substantial connectivity, with a VGA port, 10/100 Mbit Ethernet provided by a Broadcom controller, a modem, 2 USB 2.0 ports—one is compatible with the proprietary external bay CD/DVD drives—an audio input and output, a special 2.5 mm headset jack, PCMCIA card expansion slot and SD card slot—provided by a Texas Instruments controller, and an IrDA port next to the charging connector, which can be used to transfer files to other computers.

Customizable controls include 3 physical buttons along the side of the unit, a "jog dial" assembly on the same edge, and 3 stylus-sensitive spots in the bezel of the display.

Two small retractable feet on the back on the tablet allow for an angled writing surface and ventilation when placed on a flat surface, but the tablet also has extra ventilation holes to optimise the cooling when docked with the keyboard.

== Software features ==
- Q Menu is a customisable menu, that can be accessed either by tapping the Q icon in the system tray, or by pushing the dedicated Q button at the top of the tablet. The user can modify the contents of the menu, by selecting from a range of predefined options, like enabling/disabling wireless communication, changing brightness, switching between different desktop profiles, rotating the screen and the ability to add other programs to the list.
- QuickLook is an application that syncs information from Outlook to a SD or CF card, where it installs a special OS based on BSD, made by HP and Phoenix, which allows the user to quickly view their latest mails, appointments and contacts. Also, the user can copy custom HTML files, with pictures and JavaScript support to quickly view. This OS can only be accessed by pushing the dedicated QuickLook button, which is also used as the button to switch from the internal display to the external display when Windows is running.

== Discontinuation ==
By the end of 2005, HP had discontinued the TC1100. However, it retained a loyal following due to its uncommon design. HP's official response to questions about the TC1100's discontinuation was "HP remains committed to the Tablet PC platform".

HP released a new line of tablets, starting with the TX series. These updated versions are substantially more powerful than the TC series, but are of the more conventional convertible design.
