= Windows XP editions =

Versions of Windows XP

Windows XP, which is the next version of Windows NT after Windows 2000 and the successor to the consumer-oriented Windows Me, has been released in several editions since its original release in 2001.

Windows XP is available in many languages. In addition, add-ons translating the user interface are also available for certain languages.

== Main editions ==
=== Home & Professional ===
Diagram representing the main editions of Windows XP, based on the category of the edition (grey) and codebase (black arrow)

The first two editions released by Microsoft are Windows XP Home Edition, designed for home users, and Windows XP Professional, designed for business and power users.

Windows XP Professional offers a number of features unavailable in the Home Edition, including:

- The ability to become part of a Windows Server domain, a group of computers that are remotely managed by one or more central servers.
- An access control scheme that allows specific permissions on files to be granted to specific users under normal circumstances. However, users can use tools other than Windows Explorer (like cacls or File Manager), or restart to Safe Mode to modify access control lists.
- Remote Desktop server, which allows a PC to be operated by another Windows XP user over a local area network or the Internet.
- Offline Files and Folders, which allow the PC to automatically store a copy of files from another networked computer and work with them while disconnected from the network.
- Encrypting File System, which encrypts files stored on the computer's hard drive so they cannot be read by another user, even with physical access to the storage medium.
- Centralized administration features, including Group Policies, Automatic Software Installation and Maintenance, Roaming User Profiles, and Remote Installation Services (RIS).
- Internet Information Services (IIS), Microsoft's HTTP and FTP Server.
- Support for two physical central processing units (CPUs). (Because the number of CPU cores and simultaneous multithreading capabilities on modern CPUs are considered to be part of a single physical processor, multi-core CPUs are supported using XP Home Edition.)
- Windows Management Instrumentation Console (WMIC): WMIC is a command-line tool designed to ease WMI information retrieval about a system by using simple keywords (aliases).
- The ability to switch hard disk storage type from Basic to Dynamic and vice versa.

=== Edition N ===
In March 2004, the European Commission fined Microsoft €497 million (£395 million or $784 million) and ordered the company to provide a version of Windows without Windows Media Player. The Commission concluded that Microsoft "broke European Union competition law by leveraging its near monopoly in the market for PC operating systems onto the markets for work group server operating systems and for media players". After unsuccessful appeals in 2004 and 2005, Microsoft reached an agreement with the Commission where it would release a court-compliant version, Windows XP Edition N. This version does not include the company's Windows Media Player but instead encourages users to pick and download their own media player. Microsoft wanted to call this version Reduced Media Edition, but EU regulators objected and suggested the Edition N name, with the N signifying "not with Media Player" for both Home and Professional editions of Windows XP. Because it is sold at the same price as the version with Windows Media Player included, Dell, Hewlett-Packard, Lenovo and Fujitsu Siemens have chosen not to stock the product. However, Dell did offer the operating system for a short time. Consumer interest has been low, with roughly 1,500 units shipped to OEMs, and no reported sales to consumers.

The N editions of Windows XP also do not include Windows Movie Maker, but Microsoft has made this available as a separate download.

=== K & KN ===
In December 2005, the Korean Fair Trade Commission ordered Microsoft to make available editions of Windows XP and Windows Server 2003 that do not contain Windows Media Player or Windows Messenger. Like the European Commission decision, this decision was based on the grounds that Microsoft had abused its dominant position in the market to push other products onto consumers. Unlike that decision, however, Microsoft was also forced to withdraw the non-compliant versions of Windows from the South Korean market.

The K and KN editions of Windows XP Home Edition and Professional Edition were released in August 2006, and are only available in English and Korean. Both editions contain links to third-party instant messenger and media player software.

=== Home Edition ULCPC ===
This edition of Windows XP Home is intended for sale with certain "low-cost" netbooks and will appear labeled as "Windows XP Home Edition ULCPC" on the back of the netbook (with "ULCPC" standing for "ultra-low-cost personal computer"). This edition contains a regular license of Windows XP Home Edition with Service Pack 3 included.

=== Professional Blade PC Edition ===
This version comes preinstalled on OEM solutions providing desktops on Blade PC hardware. In addition to a copy of Windows XP Professional, it includes a Remote Desktop License.

=== Starter edition ===
A screenshot of a PC running Windows XP Starter, with Service Pack 3 (SP3)

Windows XP Starter is a lower-cost version of Windows XP available in Thailand, Vietnam, Turkey, Indonesia, India, Philippines, Russia, Colombia, Brazil, Argentina, Peru, Bolivia, Chile, Mexico, Ecuador, Uruguay, Malaysia, and Venezuela. It is similar to Windows XP Home Edition, but is limited to low-end hardware, can only run 3 programs at a time, and has some other features either removed or disabled by default.

According to a Microsoft press release, Windows XP Starter is "a low-cost introduction to the Microsoft Windows XP operating system designed for first-time desktop PC users in developing countries."

==== Specialization ====
The Starter edition includes some special features for certain markets where consumers may not be computer literate. Not found in the Home Edition, these include localized help features for those who may not speak English, a country-specific computer wallpapers and screensavers, and other default settings designed for easier use than typical Windows XP installations. One such setting is both the desktop icons and the mouse cursor size are set to large to assist new computer users.

In addition, the Starter edition also has some unique limitations to prevent it from displacing more expensive versions of Windows XP:

- Only three applications can be run at once on the Starter edition, and each application may open a maximum of three windows. If a user tried to open more, a dialog message box would pop up reminding them of this limitation. This also helped the computer from getting overloaded with lots of open windows and programs as Windows XP Starter is licensed only for low-end processors like Intel's Celeron or AMD's Duron and Sempron.
- There is a 512 MB limit on main memory and a 120 GB disk size limit. Microsoft has not made it clear, however, if this is for total disk space, per partition, or per disk.
- The maximum screen resolution is 1024×768, originally 800x600.
- There is no support for multiple user accounts. Windows Setup creates a user account automatically.
- There is no support for securing the user account with a password. Upon machine startup, Windows XP Starter will auto logon.
- PC-PC networking, joining a domain, and sharing printers across a network is not supported.
- Classic view in the control panel is not supported.
- Only one wallpaper is included by default, but localized versions contained more wallpapers and screensavers related to the locale. The Malaysian version, for example, contains a desktop background of the Kuala Lumpur skyline.
- There are fewer options for customizing the themes, desktop, and taskbar. It notably does not ship with the Luna theme enabled and the only theme available is the Windows Classic theme. The file is, however, present and can be activated by changing registry settings.
- To remind users that they are using Windows XP Starter, there is a persistent watermark in the lower right hand corner of the screen that is visible at all times. This watermark is similar in behavior to the Windows activation watermark in Windows 10.

==== Market adoption ====
On October 9, 2006, Microsoft announced that they reached a milestone of 1 million units of Windows XP Starter sold. In the mass market, however, the Starter edition has not had much success. In many markets where it is available, pirated versions of higher end versions of Windows are more popular than their legal counterparts. In these markets, non-genuine copies of XP Professional can be obtained at a mall. These stores typically charge only for the amount of the CDs/DVDs taken up by the files, not the original retail value. Unlicensed copies of Windows XP Professional typically cost 70¢, since it only uses 1 CD, compared to around $30 for a properly licensed copy of XP Starter.

=== Media Center Edition ===
Windows XP MCE 2005 Menu

Windows XP MCE 2005's desktop, when Media Center is not running

This edition, which was code-named "Freestyle" during its development, was first released in September 2002. The initial release was available solely in conjunction with computers that included media center capabilities, and could not be purchased separately. The first major update was released in 2004 and distributed by Tier 1 OEMs who had previously sold Windows XP Media Center Edition PC, and then updated again in 2005, which was the first edition available for System Builders. Many of the features of Windows XP Media Center Edition 2005 (including screen dancers, auto playlist DJ, and high end visual screen savers) were taken from the Windows XP Plus! packages. These were originally shipped as add-ons to Windows XP to enhance the users experience of their Windows XP machine.

==== Releases ====
A preview version of Windows XP Media Center Edition from Microsoft's eHome division, was shown as CES 2002, with the final version released in July 2002.

- Windows XP Media Center Edition ("Freestyle", July 2002) This was the original release. Updates to this release added features such as FM radio tuning. This release combined with updates is sometimes referred to as Windows XP Media Center Edition 2003.
- Windows XP Media Center Edition 2004 ("Harmony", September 2003) Windows XP Service Pack 2 upgrades earlier versions of MCE to this one.
- Windows XP Media Center Edition 2005 ("Symphony", October 2004) is the first edition of MCE available to non-Tier 1 system builders. Among other things it includes support for Media Center Extenders, and CD/DVD-Video burning support.
- Update Rollup 2 for Windows XP Media Center Edition 2005 ("Emerald", October 2005) is a major update to MCE 2005 (Symphony) and was a recommended download. It adds support for the Xbox 360 as a media center extender, DVB-T broadcasts, and support for two ATSC tuner cards.

After the 2005 release, Microsoft focused their efforts on building new media center features into "Home Premium" and "Ultimate" editions of Windows Vista and Windows 7, which have Windows Media Center built-in and, unlike the releases of Windows XP Media Center Edition, were available for retail purchase without the necessary hardware.

==== Features ====
The most notable feature unique to this edition is the Windows Media Center, which provides a large-font, remotely accessible interface ("10-foot user interface") for television viewing on the computer as well as recording and playback, a TV guide, DVD playback, video playback, photo viewing, and music playback. Unlike competing commercial digital video recorder products, Microsoft does not charge a monthly subscription fee for its Media Center TV guide service.

Due to strict hardware requirements, Microsoft did not sell Media Center Edition in retail markets alongside the Home and Professional editions. Microsoft only distributes it to MSDN subscribers and OEM System Builders in certain countries. Consumers generally purchase Media Center pre-installed on a new computer, or from a reseller that sells OEM versions of Microsoft software.

Media Center Edition was the only consumer-oriented edition of Windows XP that was updated with new features on an annual basis during the five-year development of Windows Vista. The MCE 2005 release, for example, includes an update to Windows Movie Maker that supports burning DVDs, a new visual style called "Royale", support for Media Center Extenders, and SoundSpectrum's G-Force sound visualizations. Microsoft also released its own remote control, receiver and infrared blaster with MCE 2005. A new specially designed wireless computer keyboard for MCE 2005 was released September 2005.

Using Media Center Extenders or the Xbox 360, Media Center Edition is also able to connect and stream recorded TV, music and pictures, over a network connection.

Media Center Edition retains most of the features included in Windows XP Professional as it is simply an add-on to Professional, installed when provided with a valid MCE product key during setup. All Professional features have been left in, including Remote Desktop and the Encrypting File System, however the ability to join an Active Directory domain has been removed as it is marketed as a home product with no need for domain support. One value in the registry is all that is needed to circumvent this restriction; if the installation of MCE 2005 is an in-place upgrade from a previous version already joined to a domain, this ability is retained, unless a user uses a Windows Media Center Extender: in this case, such ability is lost and cannot be restored. Presumably, Microsoft introduced this limit because Media Center Extender devices, introduced in this version, rely on the Fast User Switching component, but this component must be disabled in order to join a domain.

==== Hardware requirements ====
Media Center has higher hardware requirements than other editions of Windows XP. MCE 2005 requires at least a 1.6 GHz processor, DirectX 9.0 hardware-accelerated GPU (ATI Radeon 9000 series or Nvidia GeForce FX series or higher), and 256 MB of system RAM. Some functionality, such as Media Center Extender support, use of multiple tuners, or HDTV playback/recording carries higher system requirements.

Media Center is much more restricted in the range of hardware that it supports than most other software DVR solutions. Media Center tuners must have a standardized driver interface, and they (originally) required a hardware MPEG-2 encoder, closed caption support, and a number of other features. Media Center remote controls are standardized in terms of button labels and functionality, and, to a degree, general layout.

=== Tablet PC Edition ===
Screenshot of a PC running Windows XP Tablet PC edition, with Service Pack 3 (SP3)

This edition is intended for specially designed notebook/laptop computers called tablet PCs. Windows XP Tablet PC Edition is compatible with a pen-sensitive screen, supporting handwritten notes and portrait-oriented screens. Except for MSDN and Volume License subscribers, Windows XP Tablet Edition could not be purchased separately.

Tablet PC Edition is a superset of Windows XP Professional, the difference being tablet functionality, including alternate text input (Tablet PC Input Panel) and basic drivers for support of tablet PC specific hardware. Requirements to install Tablet PC Edition include a tablet digitizer or touchscreen device, and hardware control buttons including a Ctrl-Alt-Delete shortcut button, scrolling buttons, and at least one user-configurable application button.

There have been two releases:

- Windows XP Tablet PC Edition – The original version released in November 2002.
- Windows XP Tablet PC Edition 2005 – The Tablet PC version released in August 2004 (codenamed Lonestar) as part of Windows XP Service Pack 2. The 2005 edition is available as a service pack upgrade, or as a new OEM version.

Service Pack 2 for Windows XP includes Tablet PC Edition 2005 and is a free upgrade. This version brought improved handwriting recognition and improved the Input Panel, allowing it to be used in almost every application. The Input Panel was also revised to extend speech recognition services (input and correction) to other applications.

==== Included software ====
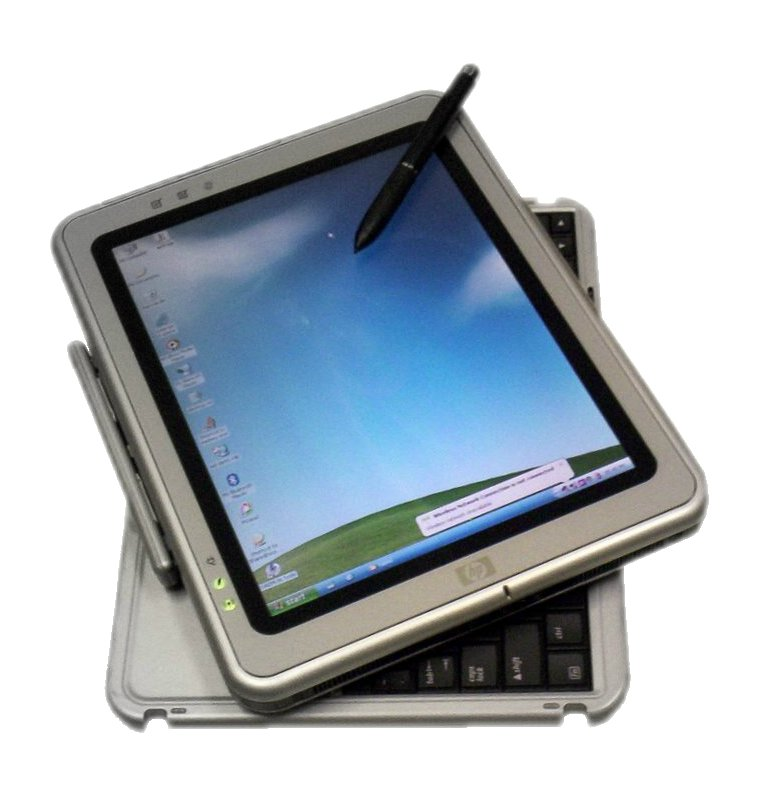
HP TC1100 tablet PC running Windows XP Tablet PC Edition and Energy Blue Theme

Windows XP Tablet PC Edition is based on Windows XP Professional and includes all the software features provided in it. In addition, it includes some of the following components:

- Tablet PC Input Panel
- Windows Journal
- Sticky Notes
- InkBall
- Energy Blue theme

The following downloadable packs released by Microsoft add more functionality:

- Microsoft Experience Pack for Tablet PC
  - Ink Art
  - Ink Crossword
  - Ink Desktop
  - Media Transfer
  - Snipping Tool 2.0
- Microsoft Education Pack for Tablet PC
  - Ink Flash Cards
  - Equation Writer
  - GoBinder Lite
  - Hexic Deluxe

==== Technology ====
Windows XP Tablet PC Edition screenshot, showing a docked tip from Tablet PC Edition 2005 and Firefox 43.0

Windows XP Tablet PC Edition utilizes the Ink object as a means of data input and storage. This is a data type created as part of the Windows XP Tablet PC Edition API that allows users to manipulate and process handwritten data, including recognition results and, in some cases, the pressure information for each part of the stroke. Properties of Ink can be changed in much the same way as properties of other objects, and the data can be saved to allow future reference. Many applications referencing the Ink object also allow handwritten notes to be filtered and searched through, based on the recognition results stored when Ink is saved.

Integrated with the operating system is a Tablet PC Input Panel (TIP) which allows handwriting to be converted into text for use in most non-full-screen applications. The integrated handwriting recognition in Windows XP Tablet PC Edition 2005 can recognize print, cursive, or mixed writing. Accuracy can be increased by configuring the recognizer to expect left-handed writing or right-handed writing. Recognition in a variety of languages is available with the install of a recognizer pack. The handwriting engine cannot be trained to recognize a particular handwriting style, so the user must modify their handwriting to be better recognized by the system in order to use this feature effectively.

Speech recognition functionality is also incorporated into the Tablet Input Panel. Compared to previous versions, a substantially improved speech recognition engine version 6 (which also ships with Office 2003) and a tutorial, microphone wizard and training modules are included. It is possible to dictate text using speech in certain supported applications and control the Windows GUI and applications using speech, although the accuracy improvements further made in Windows Vista surpass these features. An update for Windows XP Tablet PC Edition containing Ink Analysis and StylusInput API support introduced in Windows Vista is also available.

== Subscription and pre-paid editions ==
In 2006, Microsoft made available two additional editions of Windows XP Home Edition for hardware manufacturers that wanted to provide subscription-based or pay as you go-based models for selling computers. These editions, named Windows XP Home Edition for Subscription Computers, and Windows XP Pro Edition for Prepaid Computers respectively, are part of the "Microsoft FlexGo" initiative, described in a company-issued press release as, "[making] PCs more accessible by dramatically reducing the entry cost and enabling customers to pay for their computer as they use it, through the purchase of prepaid cards. Market trials are starting first in emerging markets where inadequate access to consumer credit, unpredictable income and high entry costs prevent many consumers from purchasing a computer." These editions were targeted towards emerging markets such as India, Brazil, Hungary and Vietnam.

Both editions contain additional components that enforce the subscription models via metering. The metering is typically enforced with a hardware component to prevent tampering. The installation of Windows operates in "normal mode", "Limited Access Mode", or "Hardware Locked Mode" depending on the state of the subscription. When a computer has a positive time balance, it operates in "normal mode" and functions as a regular Windows XP Home Edition machine. When the time balance expires, the machine will then operate in "Limited Access Mode" for an amount of time set by the hardware manufacturer (five hours by default) before entering "Hardware Locked Mode". In Limited Access Mode, the screen uses high-contrast and low-resolution display settings, and in Hardware Locked Mode, the operating system is disabled entirely, and a message is displayed on boot-up with instructions on how to re-enable the machine.

== 64-bit editions ==
Two editions of Windows XP were released to support 64-bit hardware. Despite being similarly named, these were distinct products aimed at separate markets.

"Windows XP 64-Bit Edition" was designed to run natively on the Intel Itanium CPU family. "Windows XP Professional x64 Edition", by contrast, ran on standard x86 CPUs which supported the then-new "x86-64" 64-bit extensions.

=== Windows XP 64-Bit Edition ===
Windows XP 64-Bit Edition (sometimes referred to as Windows XP for Itanium [Edition]) was designed to run on Intel Itanium family of microprocessors in their native IA-64 mode.

Two versions of Windows XP 64-Bit Edition were released:

- Windows XP 64-Bit Edition for Itanium systems, Version 2002 – Based on Windows XP codebase, was released simultaneously alongside the 32-bit (IA-32) version of Windows XP on October 25, 2001.
- Windows XP 64-Bit Edition, Version 2003 – Based on Windows Server 2003 code base (which added support for the Itanium 2 processor), was released on March 28, 2003.

This edition was discontinued in January 2005, after Hewlett-Packard, the last distributor of Itanium-based workstations, stopped selling Itanium systems marketed as 'workstations'. As of July 2005, Windows XP 64-Bit Edition was still supported, and further security updates were made available to Windows XP Professional x64 Edition. On April 8, 2014, all support for Windows XP 64-Bit Edition was discontinued.

Windows XP 64-Bit Edition was not marketed as the Itanium version of Microsoft's other Windows XP editions, but, instead, as a separate edition made solely for the Itanium processor and its 64-bit instructions. It is mostly analogous to Windows XP Professional, but numerous older technologies, such as DAO, Jet database, NTVDM, and Windows on Windows, are no longer present, so support for MS-DOS and Win16 applications is absent. These versions also lacks most media applications, such as Windows Media Player, NetMeeting, Windows Movie Maker, and integrated CD burning.

Similar to the ability of previous alternate architecture ports of Windows (Windows NT 4.0 for PowerPC, MIPS R4x00, and Alpha) to run 16-bit x86 code via Windows on Windows, Windows XP 64-Bit Edition can run standard x86 32-bit applications through its WOW64 (Windows-on-Windows 64-bit) emulation layer. While the original Itanium processor contains an on-chip IA-32 decoder, it was deemed far too slow for serious use (running at about 400 MHz), so Microsoft and Intel wrote a software 32 to 64-bit translator dubbed the IA-32 Execution Layer. It allows real time translation of x86 32-bit instructions into IA-64 instructions, allowing 32-bit applications to run (albeit significantly more slowly than native code).

=== Windows XP Professional x64 Edition ===
This edition supports the x86-64 extension of the Intel IA-32 architecture. x86-64 is implemented by AMD as "AMD64", found in AMD's Opteron, Athlon 64 chips (and in selected Sempron processors), and implemented by Intel as "Intel 64" (formerly known as IA-32e and EM64T), found in some of Intel's Pentium 4 and most of Intel's later chips. It was released on April 25, 2005.

Windows XP Professional x64 Edition uses version 5.2.3790.1830 of core operating system binaries, the same version used by Windows Server 2003 SP1 as they were the latest versions during the operating system's development. Even service packs and updates for Windows XP x64 and Windows Server 2003 x64 are distributed in unified packages, much in the manner as Windows 2000 Professional and Server editions for x86.

During the initial development phases (2003–2004), Windows XP Professional x64 Edition was named Windows XP 64-Bit Edition for x86 Extended Systems and later, Windows XP 64-Bit Edition for Extended Systems, as opposed to 64-Bit Edition for Itanium Systems.

=== Service packs ===
The RTM version of Windows XP Professional x64 Edition is based on Windows Server 2003 with Service Pack 1. For the same reason, Service Pack 2 for Windows XP x64 Edition, released on the March 13, 2007, is not the same as Service Pack 2 for IA-32 versions of Windows XP. In fact, due to the earlier release date of the 32-bit version, many of the key features introduced by Service Pack 2 for 32-bit (x86) editions of Windows XP were already present in the RTM version of its x86-64 counterpart. Service Pack 2 is the first and last released service pack for Windows XP Professional x64 Edition.

=== Software compatibility ===
Windows XP Professional x64 Edition uses a technology named Windows-on-Windows 64-bit (WOW64), which permits the execution of 32-bit x86 applications. It was first employed in Windows XP 64-Bit Edition (for the Itanium), but then reused for the "x64 Editions" of Windows XP and Windows Server 2003.

Since the x86-64 architecture includes hardware-level support for 32-bit instructions, WOW64 switches the processor between 32- and 64-bit modes. According to Microsoft, 32-bit software running under WOW64 has a similar performance when executing under 32-bit Windows, but with fewer threads possible and other overheads. All 32-bit processes are shown with *32 in the task manager, while 64-bit processes have no extra text present.

Although 32-bit applications can be run transparently, the mixing of the two types of code within the same process is not allowed. A 64-bit application cannot link against a 32-bit library (DLL) and, similarly, a 32-bit application cannot link against a 64-bit library. This may lead to the need for library developers to provide both 32- and 64-bit binary versions of their libraries. Windows XP x64 Edition includes both 32- and 64-bit versions of Internet Explorer 6, in order to allow for the possibility that some third-party browser plugins or ActiveX controls may not yet be available in 64-bit versions.

Older 32-bit drivers and services are not supported by 64-bit Windows, but video and audio codecs such as XviD or OggDS (which are 32-bit DLLs), are supported as long as the media player that uses them is 32-bit as well.

64-bit Windows does not include NTVDM or Windows on Windows, so there is no native support for the execution of MS-DOS or 16-bit Windows applications, such as those written for Windows 3.1.

=== Upgradeability ===
A machine running Windows XP Professional x64 Edition cannot be directly upgraded to Windows Vista, because the 64 bit Vista DVD mistakenly recognizes XP x64 as a 32-bit system. XP x64 does qualify the customer to use an upgrade copy of Windows Vista or Windows 7, but it must be installed as a clean install.

The last version of Microsoft Office to be compatible with Windows XP Professional x64 Edition is Office 2007, and the last version of Internet Explorer compatible with the operating system is Internet Explorer 8 (Service Pack 2 is required).

=== Advantages ===
The primary benefit of moving to 64-bit is the increase in the maximum allocatable virtual memory. A single standard process on a 32-bit Windows operating system is limited to a total of 2,093,056 kilobytes (2 GB minus one 4 KB page), while large address aware 32-bit processes can allocate up to 4 GB. Windows XP x64 can support much more memory; although the theoretical memory limit a 64-bit computer can address is about 16 exabytes, Windows XP x64 is limited to 128 GB of physical memory and 8 terabytes of virtual memory per process while the practical limit is usually the size of the pagefile.

Windows XP Professional x64 Edition and Windows XP 64-bit Edition Version 2003 are the only releases of Windows XP to include Internet Information Services 6.0, which matches the version shipped with Windows Server 2003; other versions of XP include 5.1. 64-bit versions of Windows XP are also immune to certain types of viruses and malware that target 32-bit systems, since most system files are 64-bit. The extra registers of the x86-64 architecture can result in performance improvements in certain kinds of applications, but more often than not, will result in a slight decrease in performance when compared to the same application implemented in 32 bit x86 code running on Windows XP 32 bit editions.

== Editions for embedded systems ==
Microsoft has released a number of editions of Windows XP that are targeted towards developers of embedded devices, for use in specific consumer electronics, set-top boxes, kiosks/ATMs, medical devices, arcade video games, point-of-sale terminals, and Voice over Internet Protocol (VoIP) components. These editions all belong to Windows Embedded subfamilies.

=== Windows XP for Embedded Systems ===
Windows XP for Embedded Systems is binary identical to Windows XP Professional, but is licensed only for embedded devices.

=== Windows XP Embedded ===
Screenshot of Windows XP Embedded Evaluation running several Windows components

Windows XP Embedded, commonly abbreviated "XPe", is a componentized version of the Professional edition of Windows XP. An original equipment manufacturer is free to choose only the components needed thereby reducing operating system footprint and also reducing attack area as compared with XP Professional. Unlike Windows CE, Microsoft's operating system for portable devices and consumer electronics, XP Embedded provides the full Windows API, and support for the full range of applications and device drivers written for Microsoft Windows. The system requirements state that XPe can run on devices with at least 32 MB Compact Flash, 32 MB RAM and a P-200 microprocessor. XPe was released on November 28, 2001. As of October 2008, the newest release is Windows XP Embedded Service Pack 3.

The devices targeted for XPe have included automatic teller machines, arcade games, slot machines, cash registers, industrial robotics, thin clients, set-top boxes, network attached storage (NAS), time clocks, navigation devices, railroad locomotives, etc. Custom versions of the OS can be deployed onto anything but a full-fledged PC; even though XPe supports the same hardware that XP Professional supports (x86 architecture), licensing restrictions prevent it from being deployed on to standard PCs. However, Microsoft has made some exceptions to this rule, allowing XPe alongside a standard OEM install of Windows. Some Dell notebooks contain an embedded XP installation as part of the MediaDirect 2.0 feature, and they were also found on some Acer ones as well as the Samsung Q1.

Windows Embedded Standard 2009 succeeded XPe in the second half of 2008. Windows Embedded Standard 2009 is derived from Windows XP Embedded since Microsoft at the time of its development did not have a componentized version of Windows Vista. Windows Embedded Standard 2009 includes Silverlight, .NET Framework 3.5, Internet Explorer 7, Windows Media Player 11, RDP 6.1, Network Access Protection, Microsoft Baseline Security Analyzer and support for being managed by Windows Server Update Services and System Center Configuration Manager. It can be installed on top of Windows XP/Server 2003, Vista/Server 2008.

Windows Embedded Standard 7 has succeeded Windows Embedded Standard 2009 in April 2010 and is a componentized version of Windows 7.

==== Features ====
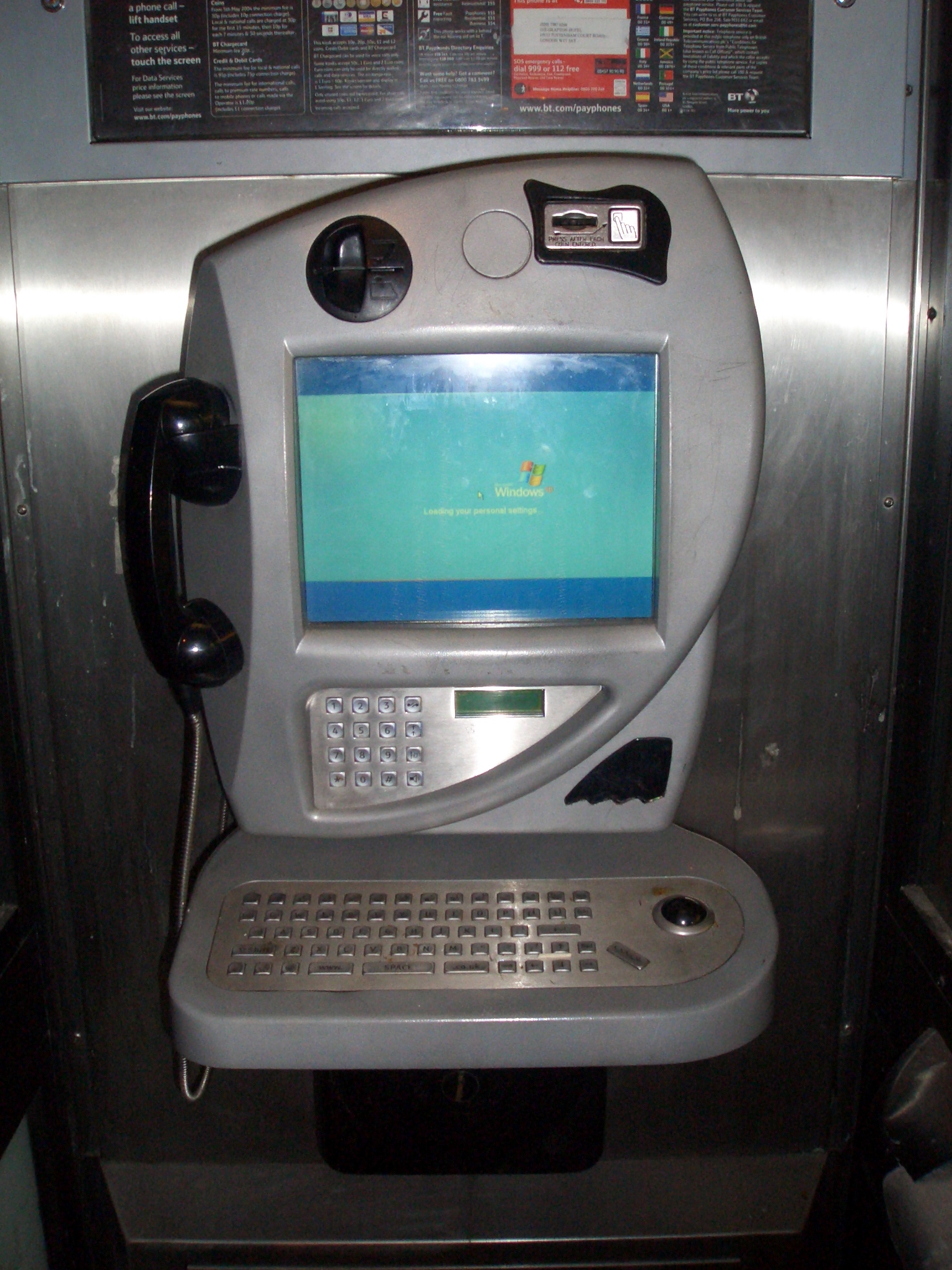
A BT Internet payphone loading Windows XP Embedded

Write filters
XPe includes components known as write filters, which can be used to filter out disk writes. The volumes can be marked as read-only using these filters and all writes to it can be redirected. Applications in user mode are unaware of this write filtering. XPe ships with two write filters:
1. Enhanced Write Filter (EWF): Protects a system at volume level. It redirects all disk writes to a protected drive, to RAM or a separate disk. EWF is extremely useful when used in thin clients that have flash memory as their primary boot source.
2. File Based Write Filter (FBWF): Allows the configuration of individual files as read/write on a protected volume

USB boot
XPe adds a USB boot option to Windows. An XPe embedded device can be configured to boot from a USB drive.

CD boot
An XPe device can be configured to boot from a CD-ROM. This allows the device to boot without the requirement of having a physical hard disk drive as well as provides a "fresh boot" every time the image is booted (a property inherited by the fact that the operating system is being booted from read-only media). One drawback to this technology is updating or servicing the image requires the complete process of setting up the runtime image to be completed once again from start to end.

Network boot
An XPe device can be configured to boot from a properly configured network. Synonymous to CD boot, network boot removes the requirement of having the physical hard drive as well as providing the "fresh boot" behavior. One bonus to Network Boot though is the ability to service the already setup image. Once the image is updated the image is simply posted to the RIS Server and once clients are rebooted they will receive the updated image.

=== Windows Embedded for Point of Service ===
Windows Embedded for Point of Service (WEPOS) is a specialization of Windows XP Embedded. It was released on May 25, 2005, and focuses on the point of sale device market, such as fuel pumps, self checkout stations, automated teller machines and cash registers. It is not available for purchase directly from Microsoft, but is instead licensed to original equipment manufacturers.

Windows Embedded POSReady 2009 succeeded WEPOS in January 2009. Windows Embedded POSReady 2009 is derived from WEPOS since Microsoft at the time of its development did not have a componentized version of Windows Vista.

Windows Embedded POSReady 7 has succeeded Windows Embedded POSReady 2009 in July 2011 and is based on Windows 7 SP1.

=== Windows Fundamentals for Legacy PCs ===
In July 2006, Microsoft introduced a "thin-client" variant of Windows XP Embedded called Windows Fundamentals for Legacy PCs, which targets older machines (as early as the original Pentium). It is only available to Software Assurance customers. It is intended for those who would like to upgrade to Windows XP to take advantage of its security and management capabilities, but cannot afford to purchase new hardware.

Windows Thin PC has succeeded Windows Fundamentals for Legacy PCs in June 2011 and is based on Windows Embedded Standard 7 SP1.
