= S12 =

S12 may refer to:

== Aviation ==
- Albany Municipal Airport (Oregon), in Linn County, Oregon, United States
- Letov Š-12, a Czechoslovak prototype fighter aircraft
- Rans S-12 Airaile, an American civil utility aircraft
- SABCA S.XII, a Belgian passenger aircraft
- SIAI S.12, an Italian flying-boat
- Sikorsky S-12, a Russian trainer aircraft
- SPAD S.XII, a French biplane fighter
- Spencer S-12 Air Car, an American amphibious aircraft
- Stemme S12, a German motor glider

== Rail and transit ==
=== Lines ===
- S12 (Rhine-Ruhr S-Bahn), Germany
- S12 (St. Gallen S-Bahn), Switzerland
- S12 (ZVV), Zürich, Switzerland
- Line S12 (Milan suburban railway service), Italy

=== Locomotives ===
- Baldwin S-12, a diesel-electric locomotive
- Sri Lanka Railways S12, a diesel multiple unit

=== Stations ===
- Asari Station (Hokkaido), in Otaru, Hokkaido, Japan
- Bang Wa station, in Bangkok, Thailand
- Iyo-Nagahama Station, in Ōzu, Ehime Prefecture, Japan
- Kikukawa Station, in Sumida, Tokyo, Japan
- Mizuho Kuyakusho Station, in Mizuho-ku, Nagoya, Aichi Prefecture, Japan
- Myōdani Station, in Suma-ku, Kobe, Hyōgo Prefecture, Japan

== Roads ==
- Airport Expressway (Beijing), China
- Shanghai–Jiaxing–Huzhou Expressway, China
- S12 highway (Georgia)
- Expressway S12 (Poland)
- County Route S12 (California), United States

== Vessels ==
- Brazilian submarine Bahia (S-12, 1963), in service 1963–1972
- Brazilian submarine Bahia (S-12, 1973), in service 1972–1993
- HMCS Caribou (S12), an armed yacht of the Royal Canadian Navy
- HMS Olympus (S12), a submarine of the Royal Navy
- USS S-12 (SS-117), a submarine of the United States Navy

== Other uses ==
- S12 (classification), a disability swimming classification
- 40S ribosomal protein S12
- British NVC community S12, a swamps and tall-herb fens community in the British National Vegetation Classification system
- Lenovo IdeaPad S12, a laptop
- Nissan Silvia (S12), a sports car
- S12: Do not keep the container sealed, a safety phrase
- Saiga-12, a Russian semi-automatic shotgun
- S12, a postcode district in Sheffield, England
