= MSI Wind =

MSI Wind may refer to:

- MSI Wind Netbook, a laptop computer
- MSI Wind PC, a desktop computer
