= Nvidia Ion =

Product line by Nvidia

Nvidia Ion was a product line of Nvidia Corporation intended for motherboards of low-cost portable computers. It used graphics processing units and chipsets intended for small products.

== Description ==
First generation Nvidia Ion products included a MCP79MX chipset with integrated GeForce 9400M G GPU, DDR3-1066 or DDR2-800 SDRAM, and the Intel Atom processor. The original reference platform was based on a Pico-ITXe motherboard designed for netbook and nettop devices. In February 2009, Microsoft certified the Ion-based platform for Windows Vista. The small form factor Ion-based computers were released in mid-2009.

Ion GPUs are DirectX 10.0 and OpenGL 3.3 compliant. They also support CUDA and OpenCL. They can play 1080p H.264, MPEG-2 and VC-1 video using VDPAU or PureVideo HD. ION-LE–based systems shared the same basic hardware as ION but lack Vista and DirectX 10 support.

Nvidia announced that it would release the Ion platform for the VIA Nano processor some time in Q4 2009., however no products materialized.

The second generation Ion is no longer a full chipset, it instead is an additional graphics card based on a downclocked GT218 core with 512MB of dedicated memory, and PCIe 1x connection to the Intel chipset. It supports Nvidia Optimus for power saving.

== Specifications ==
=== Ion (first-generation Nvidia Ion) ===
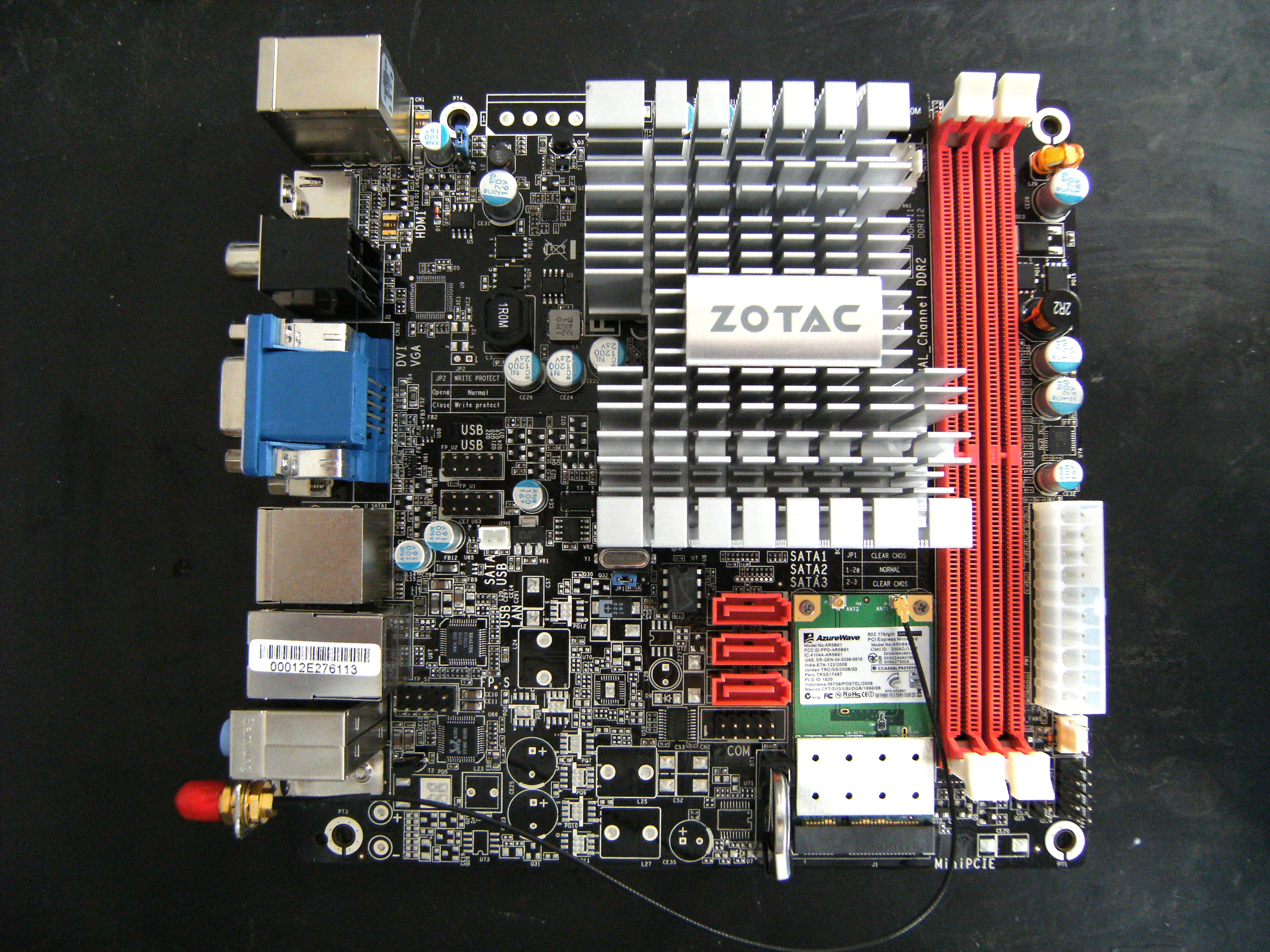
Zotac motherboard

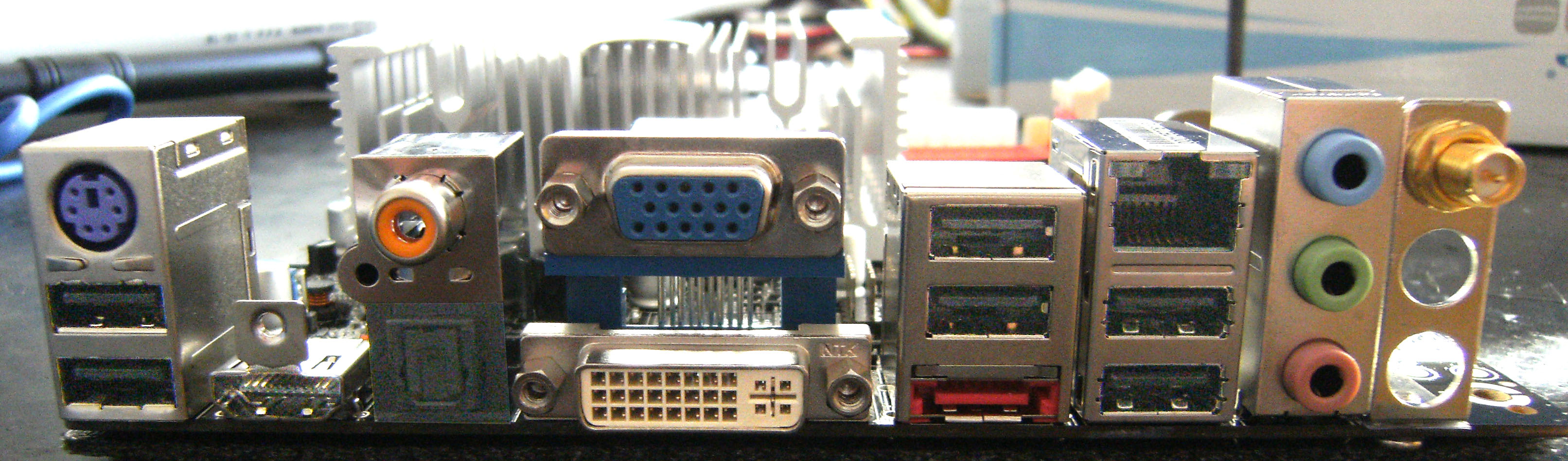
Rear connectors of Zotac motherboard

- Chipset: MCP79MX (with integrated GeForce 9400M GPU)
- Intended Operating System: (Ion): Microsoft Windows XP, Vista, Windows 7, Linux; (Ion-LE): Microsoft Windows XP, Linux
- Memory Interface: DDR3-1066 or DDR2-800
- DirectX 10 Support: Yes, No (Ion-LE)
- Graphics Cores: 16
- Core/Shader Clocks: 450/1100 MHz
- Texture Fill Rate: 3.6 Billion/second
- Maximum Anti-Aliasing (AA) Sample Rate: 16x
- RAMDACs: 300 MHz
- Maximum High-Dynamic Range (HDR) Precision: 128-bit
- Maximum Analog Resolution: 2048 × 1536
- Maximum Digital Resolution: 2560 × 1600
- Graphics APIs: DirectX 10.0, OpenGL 3.3
- Full HD decode (1080i/p): Yes, 3rd Generation PureVideo
- Display Options: HDMI, Dual-link DVI, DP, or VGA (any 2)
- HDMI Version: 1.8 (according to the manual of the zotac ION itx-f board)
- PCI-Express 2.0: 20 lanes (1×16 and 4×1)
- SATA Drives: 6
- SATA Speed: 3 Gbit/s
- RAID: 0, 1
- Networking: 10/100/1000 BASE-T
- USB Ports: 12/2C
- PCI Slots: 5
- Audio: HDA (Azalia)

=== Ion 2 (next-generation Nvidia Ion) ===
- CUDA cores: up to 16
- Standard Memory configurations: 512 MB of DDR2, 256 MB of DDR3, 512 MB of DDR3
- Memory Interface Width: Up to 64-bit
- Hardware Video Decode Acceleration: Yes, 4th Generation PureVideo
- nVidia CUDA Technology: Yes
- Certified for Windows 7: Yes
- Microsoft DirectX: 10.1
- OpenGL: 3.3
- Audio: HDA
- Maximum digital resolution: 2560 × 1600
- Maximum VGA resolution: 2048 × 1536
- Netbook supported display connectors: HDMI
- Desktop supported display connectors: Dual-link DVI, DisplayPort, HDMI, VGA
- Multi-monitor: Yes
- HDCP: Yes

=== Motherboards ===
- ASRock A330ION motherboard (Intel Atom 330 CPU, DDR3, PCI Express x16 slot)
- ASUS AT5IONT-I motherboard (Intel Atom D525 CPU, DDR3, USB3, PCI Express x4 slot @ x1 speed, with latch)
- ASUS AT3N7A-I motherboard (Intel Atom 330 CPU)
- ASUS AT3IONT-I motherboard (Intel Atom 330 CPU, DDR3, PCI Express x16 slot)
- ASUS AT3IONT-I DELUXE motherboard (Intel Atom 330 CPU, DDR3, PCI Express x16 slot, DC power connector, 802.11n WiFi and Bluetooth, Media remote)
- IEI Industrial Motherboard KINO-PVN D5251 ION2, DDR3, HDMI, Dual GbE, SATA, PCI/ PCI Expr.x1 slot, mini-PCI, CF TypeII
- Jetway NC63-230 ITX board (Intel Atom 230 CPU, 20-pin ATX power connector)
- Jetway NC63-330 ITX board (Intel Atom 330 CPU, 20-pin ATX power connector)
- Jetway NC63P-230 ITX board (Intel Atom 230 CPU, 12V DC Power Onboard)
- Jetway NC63P-330 ITX board (Intel Atom 330 CPU, 12V DC Power Onboard)
- Point of View POV/ION230 motherboard (Intel Atom 230 CPU)
- Point of View POV/ION330 motherboard (Intel Atom 330 CPU)
- ZOTAC IONITX A-B motherboard (Intel Atom 330 CPU, 90 W DC power connector, Wireless PCIe module installed)
- ZOTAC IONITX A-U motherboard (Intel Atom 330 CPU, DC power connector, Wireless PCIe module installed)
- ZOTAC IONITX B-E motherboard (Intel Atom 230 CPU, 20-pin power connector)
- ZOTAC IONITX C-U motherboard (Intel Atom 230 CPU, DC power connector)
- ZOTAC IONITX D-E motherboard (Intel Atom 330 CPU, 20-pin power connector, Wireless PCIe module installed)
- ZOTAC IONITX F-E motherboard (Intel Atom 330 CPU, 20-pin power connector, Wireless PCIe module installed, PCI Express x16 slot)
- ZOTAC IONITX G-E motherboard (Intel Atom 330 CPU, 20-pin power connector, PCI Express x1 slot, mini-PCIe x1 slot)
- ZOTAC IONITX N-E motherboard (Intel Celeron 743 CPU, 20-pin power connector, Wireless PCIe module installed, PCI Express x16 slot)
- ZOTAC IONITX P-E motherboard (Intel Celeron SU2300 CPU, 20-pin power connector, Wireless PCIe module installed, PCI Express x16 slot)

=== Desktop systems ===
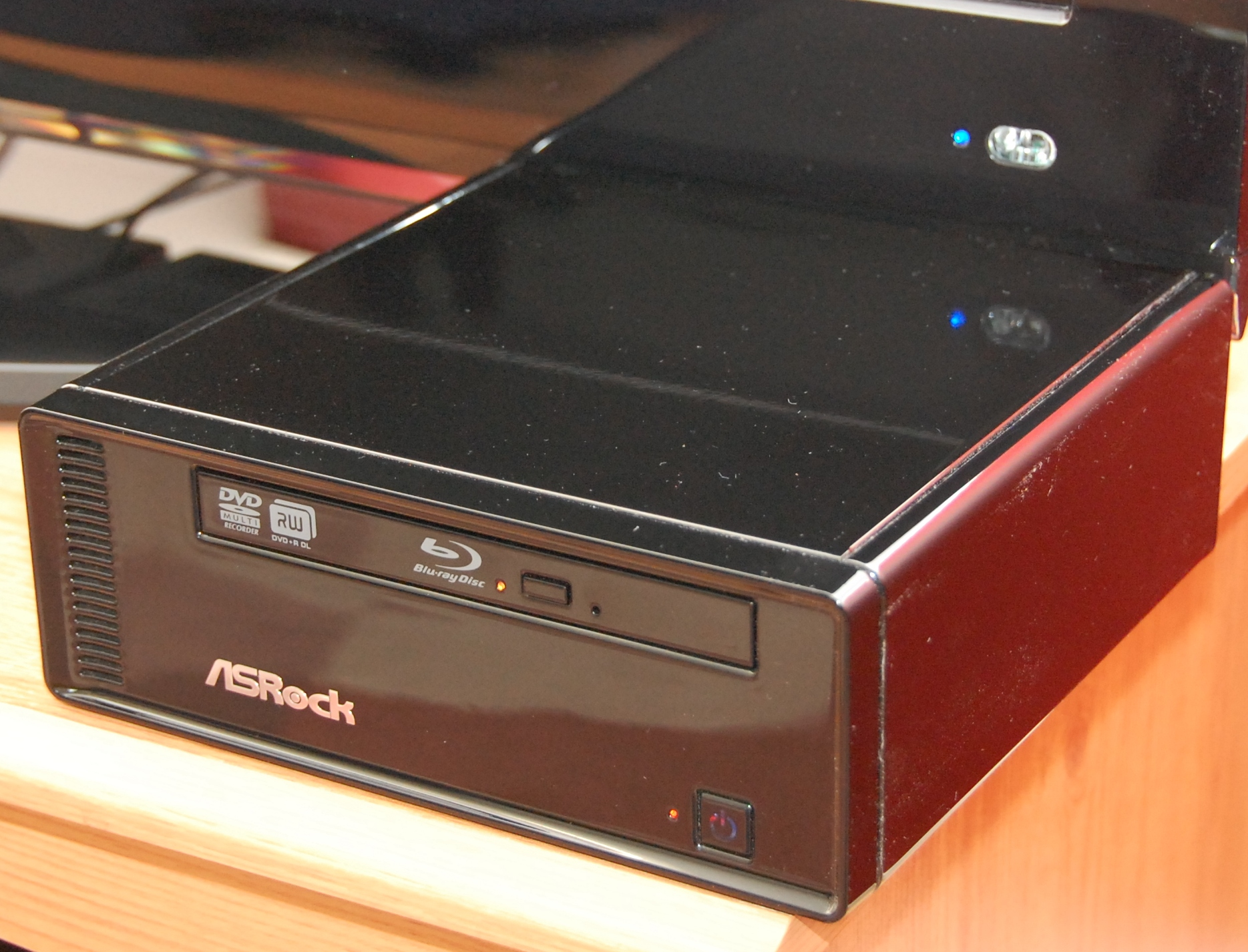
An ASRock ION 330HT-BD

- Acer AspireRevo Nettop Media Server w/Remote
- Aleutia H1 Hotel PC (with the above ZOTAC IONITX A-U), fanless in the single core version.
- aOpen GP7A
- ASRock Ion 330 series
- ASRock Ion 330HT series w/Remote
- ASRock Ion 330Pro
- ASUS Eee Box EB1012U (ION 1)
- ASUS Eee Box EB1012P (ION 2)
- ASUS Eee Box EB1501
- Asus S1-AT5NM10E
- Foxconn NetBox-nT330i
- Giada Mini PC series
- Lenovo IdeaCentre Q150 - 40816AU
- MSi All-in-One PC Wind Top AE2220
- Myka ION
- Orbit Micro Helix A58 Sleek NVIDIA ION/N330 desktop system
- Orbit Micro Helix A5W Fanless IP waterproof dustproof Nvidia ION system
- Sapphire EDGE HD
- Shuttle XS35GT, fanless system with ION2 and Atom D510
- Viewsonic VOT132
- ZaReason Ion Breeze
- Zotac Mag

=== Netbook systems ===
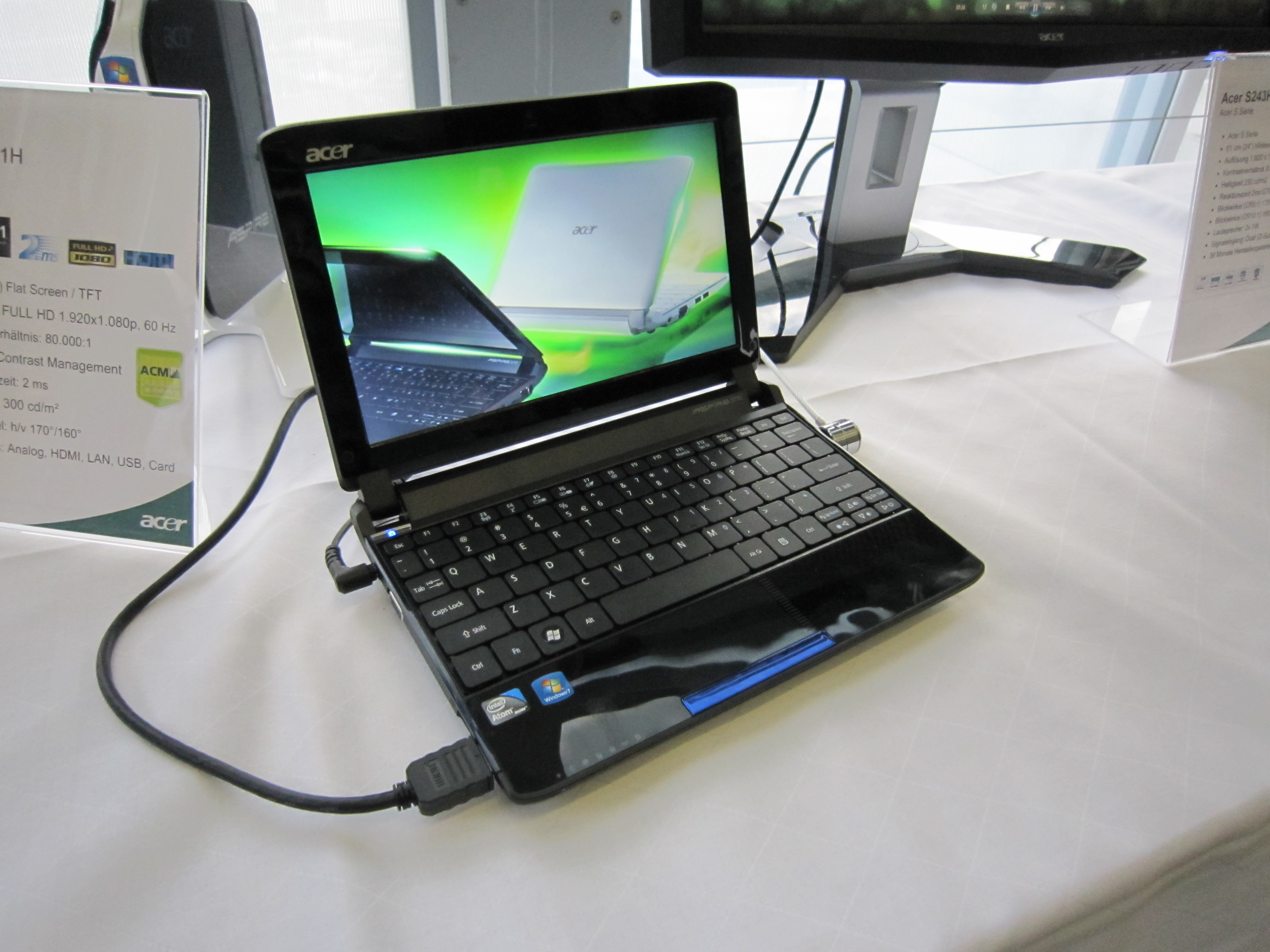
Acer Aspire One 532G

- Acer Aspire One 532G
- Asus Eee PC VX6
- Asus Eee PC 1015PN
- Asus Eee PC 1201N
- Asus Eee PC 1201NL (Only graphics component attached to Intel motherboard.
- Asus Eee PC 1215N
- HP Mini 311
- Lenovo IdeaPad S12
- Point of View Mobii ION
- Samsung N510

== Support ==
Nvidia ceased Windows driver support for Nvidia ION series on April 1, 2016.

- Windows XP 32-bit & Media Center Edition: version 340.52 (WHQL) released on July 29, 2014; Download
- Windows XP 64-bit: version 340.52 (WHQL) released on July 29, 2014; Download
- Windows Vista, 7, 8, 8.1 32-bit: version 342.01 (WHQL) released on December 14, 2016; Download
- Windows Vista, 7, 8, 8.1 64-bit: version 342.01 (WHQL) released on December 14, 2016; Download
- Windows 10, 32-bit: version 342.01 (WHQL) released on December 14, 2016; Download
- Windows 10, 64-bit: version 342.01 (WHQL) released on December 14, 2016; Download

== See also ==
- Comparison of Nvidia graphics processing units
- Tegra
