= Acer AspireRevo =

Nettop computer line

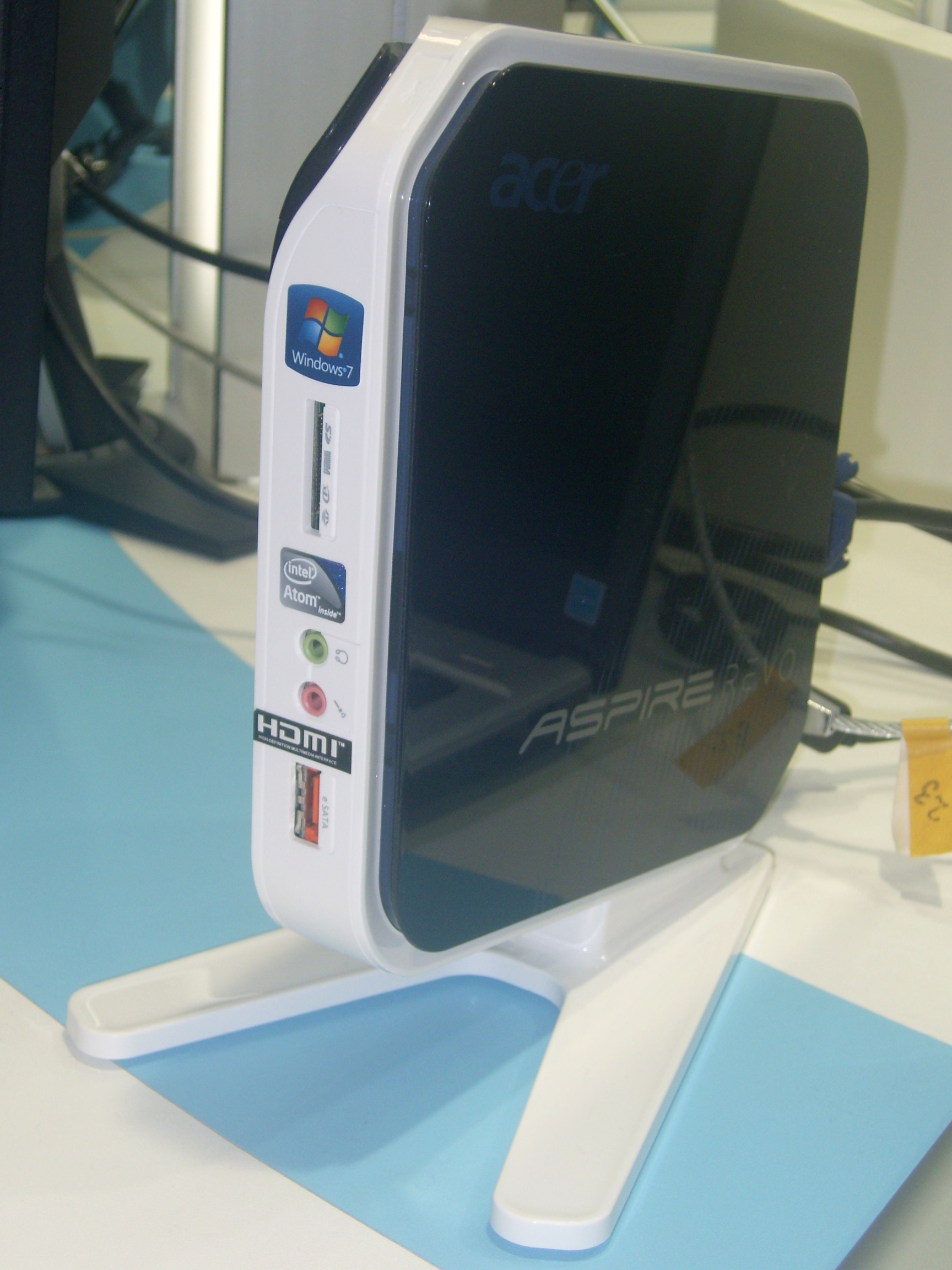
- Acer AspireRevo
- Developer: Acer
- Type: Desktop, nettop
- Media: 8 GB SSD, or up to 500 GB hard drive
- Operating system: Linux LinPus, Windows XP, Windows Vista, Windows 7
- CPU: 1.6 GHz Intel Atom 230, Intel Atom 330 Dual Core
- Memory: 1–4 GB
- Display: HDMI or VGA (D-SUB/HD15F)
- Graphics: nVidia 9400M (MCP79MX)
- Connectivity: 10/100 Mbit/s Ethernet; 802.11b/g/n wireless LAN; 6 USB 2.0 ports 4-in-1 card reader HDMI and VGA video output

The Acer AspireRevo was a line of nettop computers from Acer Inc., first released at the end of April 2009. It is one of the first desktop computers to pair the NVIDIA ION chipset with Intel's Atom CPU.

When the AspireRevo first launched, model R1600, its basic specs were an Intel Atom 230 processor (1.6 GHz), 1 GB of RAM and the NVIDIA ION graphics motherboard with Windows XP. Since then, the models of this PC have been upgraded with the launch of Windows 7. The R3600 model now features a single core Intel Atom 230 (64-bit, hyperthreading), 1 GB of RAM, a 320 GB hard-drive, 802.11n Wi-Fi and Windows 7 Home Premium edition at $329.00 US. The higher-end model R3610 features a dual core Intel Atom 330, 2 GB of RAM, a 500 GB hard-drive, 802.11n Wi-Fi and Windows 7 Home Premium at $399.00 US. Both models feature the NVIDIA ION, as well as the RAM boost, DirectX 10 support of Windows 7, graphics and overall performance increases. Although not officially supported for reasons unknown, Windows Vista also runs well if installed.

The combination of low power, relatively low price and support for hardware accelerated video make it suitable for many uses, including as a Home Theater PC (HTPC) or Media Center — for example, running Kodi (formerly Xbox Media Center).

The Acer Veriton models N260G, N270G, N281G and N282G are using the same small form factor case and partly identical hardware as the AspireRevo.

== See also ==
- Nvidia Ion
- Asus EeeBox PC
- MSI Wind PC
- Dell Studio Hybrid
- Mac Mini
