= Asus EeeBox PC =

2008 nettop computer line

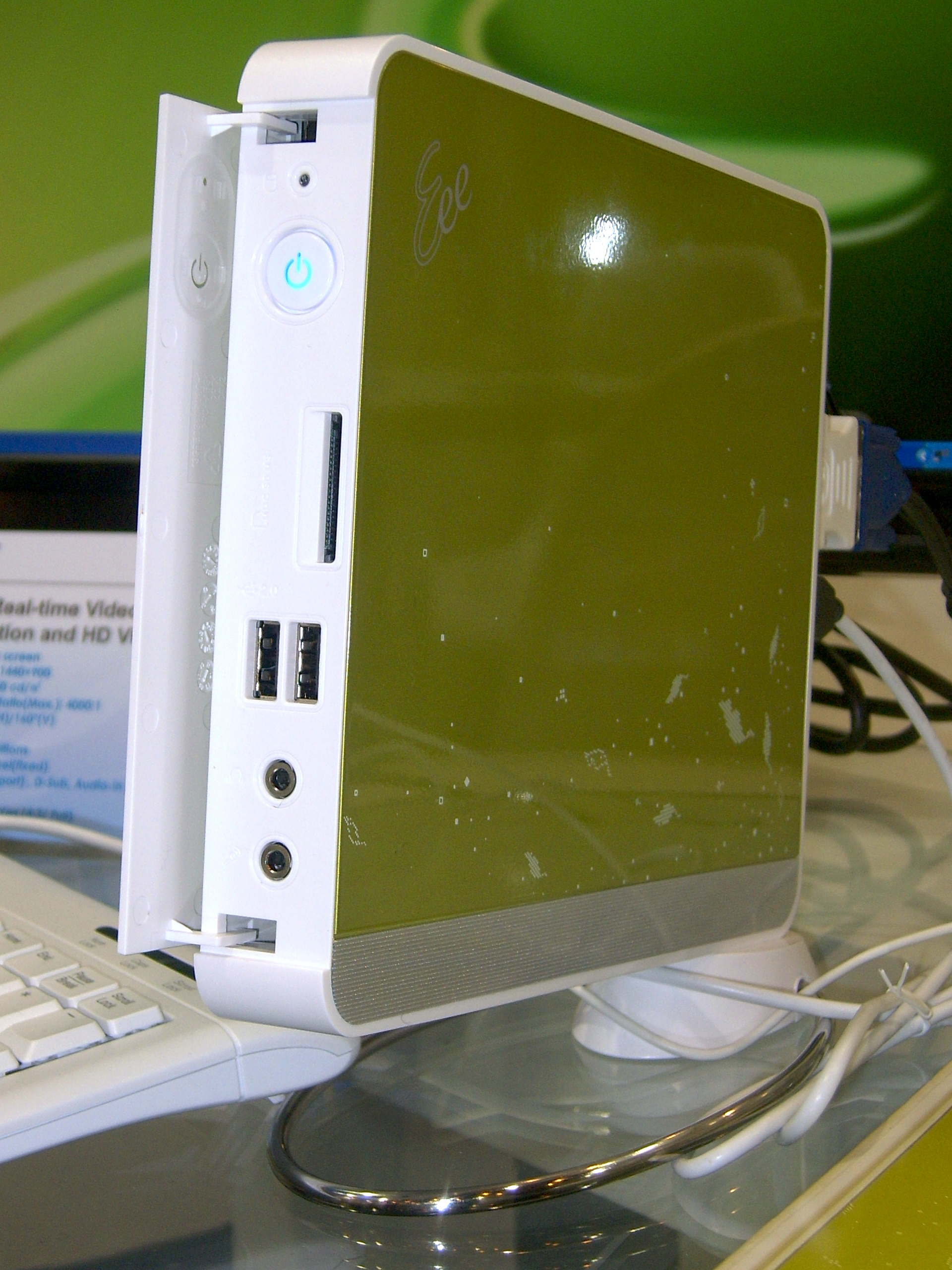
- Developer: ASUSTeK Computer Inc.
- Type: Nettop
- Operating system: Linux (Xandros), Windows XP, Windows 7, Windows 8.1
- CPU: Intel Atom N270 or Intel Atom 330, AMD E350 or E450
- Memory: DDR2, DDR3
- Storage: 160 GB - 250 GB
- Display: HDMI, DVI or VGA
- Graphics: Intel GMA 950, ATI Radeon HD 4530, or nVidia GeForce 9400M G
- Connectivity: Gigabit Ethernet; 802.11b/g/draft-n Wi-Fi; 4-6 USB 2.0 ports SD Flash Memory card reader DVI output, S/PDIF output, HDMI output
- Power: External 19 V DC, 65 W Adaptor. Average consumption is 20 W.
- Website: http://www.asus.com/ProductGroup1.aspx?PG_ID=7dDelmkESu9DXgVB

Asus EeeBox PC (formerly Asus Eee Box) is a nettop computer line from ASUSTeK Computer Incorporated, and a part of the Asus Eee product family. First released on August 11, 2008, the Asus EeeBox PC series is marketed as a small, light, inexpensive and energy-efficient counterpart to the Asus Eee PC netbook / subnotebook laptop series. Its motherboard employs Splashtop technology called Express Gate by Asus.

== Features ==
=== "Instant-On" ===
The EeeBox PC motherboard features a form of embedded Linux, referred to in the user manual as Express Gate, a result of the ASUS Splashtop software. In the EeeBox PC implementation, the user is presented with a customised Linux desktop a few seconds after powering up the EeeBox PC, with the option of launching a web browser, an online chat application, a file manager, a photo browser or a Skype application, without having to load the main operating system. If the user does not select any of these options, the main operating system (typically Windows XP Home) loads automatically.

=== Low power consumption ===
The EeeBox PC uses an external power supply; however, due to its low power requirements, the unit is physically smaller than most external laptop power supplies. As of December 2008, the supplied UK power adapter was a small rectangular in-line block measuring approximately 30 mm × 35 mm in width and around 90 mm in length, excluding the cable stress relief grommets.

=== "Zero footprint" option ===
As of December 2008, the EeeBox PC comes with two mounting options, a desktop stand, and a monitor mounting. The monitor mounting option consists of a heavy plate with mounting holes designed to fit to the VESA 100 or VESA 75 mount area found on the back of many flat-screen monitors (Flat Display Mounting Interface). When mounted on the back of a monitor, the EeeBox PC does not require any desk space. With the addition of a compatible USB "TV tuner" dongle the EeeBox PC can be used as a digital television adapter, and add both TV reception and recording facilities to a flat computer monitor.

=== Robustness ===
The EeeBox PC hard drive has a hidden recovery partition containing an image of the factory OS installation. This allows the EeeBox PC's operating system to be reset to its initial factory state without the need for any external media or optical disc hardware (although conventional recovery discs are also included).The permanently embedded Linux system ensures a functioning graphical user interface and basic functionality—such as web browsing—even in the absence of a separate operating system. In contrast, most computer systems in this situation offer only a limited set of menu-driven BIOS commands.

== Models ==
Model Number	Eee Box B201	Eee Box B202	Eee Box B203	Eee Box B204	Eee Box B206	Eee Box EB1006	Eee Box EB1007	Eee Box EB1012	Eee Box EB1012U	Eee Box EB1012P	Eee Box EB1020	Eee Box EB1021	Eee Box EB1501	Eee Box EB1501U	Eee Box EB1501P	Eee Box EB1502	Eee Box EB1503	Eee Box EB1033	Eee Box EB1035	Eee Box EB1037
Processor	Intel Celeron C220 (1.2 GHz, 533 MHz FSB)	Intel Atom N270 (1.6 GHz, 533 MHz FSB, 512 KB L2 Cache)	Intel Celeron C220 (1.2 GHz, 533 MHz FSB)	Intel Atom N270 (1.6 GHz, 533 MHz FSB, 512 KB L2 Cache)			Intel Atom D410 (1.67 GHz, 800 MHz FSB, 1 MB L2 Cache)	Intel Atom 330 (1.6 GHz, 533 MHz FSB, 1 MB L2 Cache)		Intel Atom D510 (1.67 GHz, 800 MHz FSB, 1 MB L2 Cache)	AMD Fusion C-50 (1.0 GHz, 1 MB L2 Cache)	AMD Fusion E350 (1.6 GHz, 1 MB L2 Cache)	Intel Atom 330 (1.6 GHz, 533 MHz FSB, 1 MB L2 Cache)		Intel Atom D525 (1.8 GHz, 800 MHz FSB, 1 MB L2 Cache)	Intel Atom N270 (1.6 GHz, 533 MHz FSB, 512 KB L2 Cache)	Intel Atom D2550 Dual Core 1.86 GHz or Intel Atom D2700 Dual Core 2.13 GHz			
Memory	512 MB of DDR2-533 Expandable to 1 GB	1 GB of DDR2-533 SO-DIMM Expandable to 2 GB					1 GB of DDR2-800 SO-DIMM Expandable to 2 GB	2 GB of DDR2-800 SO-DIMM Expandable to 4 GB			1 GB / 2 GB / 4 GB of DDR3-1333 SO-DIMM		2 GB of DDR2-800 SO-DIMM Expandable to 4 GB			2 x SO-DIMM Slots, DDR2-800 1G	2 GB Up to 4 GB, 2 x SO-DIMM Slots, DDR3			
Hard Drive	16 GB SSD Optional 160 GB SATA @ 5,400 RPM	80/160 GB SATA @ 5,400 RPM					250/320 GB SATA @ 5,400 RPM	250 GB SATA @ 5,400 RPM			250/320 GB SATA @ 5,400 RPM					160 GB SATA @ 5,400 RPM	320/500 GB SATA II @ 5,400 RPM			
Graphics Processor	Intel GMA 950 graphics			ATI Radeon HD 3450		ATI Radeon HD 4530	Intel GMA 3150 graphics	nVidia ION		nVidia ION 2	ATI Radeon HD 6250	ATI Radeon HD 6310	nVidia ION		nVidia ION 2	nVidia ION-LE	NV GeForce 610M			
Wireless Networking	802.11b/g/draft-n																			
Video Output	DVI-I			HDMI 1.3			VGA D-SUB	HDMI 1.3 and VGA D-SUB												
Hi-Speed USB 2.0 ports	4						6		4				6	4						
SuperSpeed USB 3.0 ports	n/a								2 (Front)				n/a	2 (Front)		n/a	2 (Front)			
Common I/O Ports	3-in-1 card reader, headphone port, microphone port, power adapter connector, Gigabit Ethernet port, Wi-Fi antenna connector, S/PDIF output			power adapter connector, Gigabit Ethernet port, Wi-Fi antenna connector, S/PDIF output	3-in-1 card reader, headphone port, microphone port, power adapter connector, Gigabit Ethernet port, Wi-Fi antenna connector, S/PDIF output, MCE Remote Control and built-in IR-receiver															
Additional I/O Ports	n/a						1 eSATA						1 eSATA & Slot-in Super Multi DVD-RW							

== See also ==
- Asus Eee Top – a PC integrated in a touchscreen monitor
- Asus Eee PC – netbooks
- Acer AspireRevo
- Dell Studio Hybrid
- Mac Mini
- MSI Wind PC
