= Asus EeeBook =

Line of laptops by Asus

- Developer: Asus
- Manufacturer: Asus
- Type: Laptop
- Released: 2014; 12 years ago
- Discontinued: 2017
- Operating system: Windows
- Predecessor: Asus Eee PC
- Successor: Asus VivoBook E Series

The Asus EeeBook is a lineup of affordable Windows laptops by Asus. In 2014, Asus introduced EeeBook lineup of computers starting with the X205TA model. By 2017 the EeeBook lineup was succeeded by the Asus VivoBook E Series. Some EeeBook laptops were rebranded to VivoBook E Series laptops such as the EeeBook E202 was rebranded to the VivoBook E202 and the EeeBook E402 to the VivoBook E402. The EeeBook lineup consists of the E202 (E202SA), E402 (E402MA), E502 (E502SA and E502MA) and X205 (X205TA)

== Comparison of specifications of EeeBook laptops ==
	E202	E402	E502		X205
	E202SA	E402MA	E502MA	E502SA	X205TA
Image					
Processor	Intel Celeron Dual-Core N3050, 2.16 GHz Intel Celeron Quad-Core N3150, 2.08 GHz Intel Pentium Quad-Core N3700, 2.4 GHz	Intel Bay Trail-M Dual Core Celeron N2840 or Intel Bay Trail-M Quad Core Celeron N2940 or Intel Bay Trail-M Quad Core Celeron N3540		Intel Pentium N3700 or Intel Celeron N3150 or Intel Celeron N3050	Intel Bay Trail-T Quad Core Z3735, 1.33 GHz
Memory	DDR3 1600 MHz SDRAM, onboard memory 2 GB / 4 GB				2 GB
Display	11.6", 1366×768 (16:9), 135 ppi	14.0", 1366×768 (16:9), 112 ppi	15.6", 1366×768 (16:9), 100 ppi		11.6", 1366×768 (16:9), 135 ppi
Graphics	Intel HD Graphics				
Storage	500 GB 5400 RPM or 1 TB 5400 RPM 7 mm SATA 3 HDD	500 GB 5400 RPM HDD or 750 GB 5400 RPM HDD or 1 TB 5400 RPM HDD	500 GB 5400 RPM HDD or 750 GB 5400 RPM HDD or 1 TB 5400 RPM HDD or 32 GB eMMC	500 GB 5400 RPM HDD or 1 TB 5400 RPM HDD or 32 GB eMMC	32 GB or 64 GB or 128 GB eMMC
WebCam	VGA Web Camera				
Networking	Integrated 802.11 ac Built-in Bluetooth™ V4.0	Integrated 802.11 b/g/n Built-in Bluetooth™ V4.0 10/100/Gigabits Base T	Integrated 802.11 b/g/n Built-in Bluetooth™ V4.0 10/100 Base T		Built-in Bluetooth™ V4.0
Interface	1 × headphone-out jack (audio-in combo) 1 × USB 3.0 port(s) 1 × USB 2.0 port(s) 1 × USB-C Gen 1 (up to 5 Gbit/s) 1 × micro HDMI	1 × COMBO audio jack 1 × Line-in Jack 1 × VGA port/Mini D-sub 15-pin for external monitor 1 × USB 3.0 port(s) 1 × USB 2.0 port(s) 1 × RJ45 LAN Jack 1 × HDMI	1 × COMBO audio jack 1 × VGA port/Mini D-sub 15-pin for external monitor 1 × USB 3.0 port(s) 1 × USB 2.0 port(s) 1 × RJ45 LAN Jack 1 × HDMI		1 × microphone-in/headphone-out jack 2 × USB 2.0 port(s) 1 × micro HDMI 1 × micro SD card
Audio	Built-in speakers and digital array microphone	SonicMaster			Built-in speakers and microphone ASUS SonicMaster Technology
Battery	3Cells 48 Whrs Polymer Battery	2Cells 32 Whrs			38 Whrs polymer battery
Dimensions (width × depth × height)	297 mm × 193.3 mm × 21.4 mm	339 cm × 235 cm × 21.9 cm	38.3 cm × 25.8 cm × 22.1 cm		286 mm × 193.3 mm × 17.5 mm
Weight (kg)	1.2	1.65	1.86		0.98
