= Asus Eee PC =

Netbook computer line by Asus

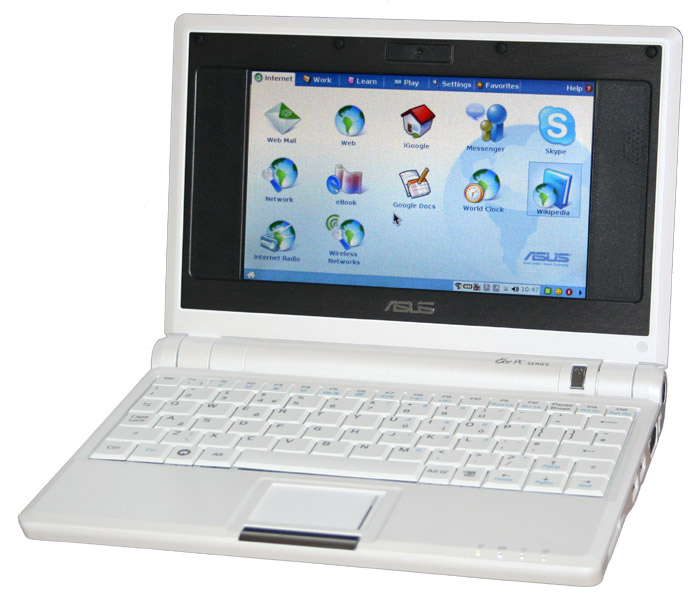
- Developer: Asus
- Type: Netbook
- Released: 2007; 19 years ago
- Discontinued: 2013
- Operating system: Linux (Xandros); Windows (XP, 7, 8.1)
- CPU: Intel (Celeron, Atom); AMD (AMD Fusion)
- Predecessor: Asus EeeBook
- Website: eeepc.asus.com at the Wayback Machine (archived 2008-05-31)

The ASUS Eee PC is a netbook computer line from Asus, and a part of the ASUS Eee product family. At the time of its introduction in late 2007, it was noted for its combination of a lightweight, Linux-based operating system, solid-state drive (SSD), and relatively low cost. Newer models added the options of Microsoft Windows operating system and rotating media hard disk drives (HDD), and initially retailed for up to €500.

The first Eee PC was a milestone in the personal computer business, launching the netbook category of small, low-cost laptops in the West (in Japan, subnotebooks had long been a staple in computing). According to Asus, the name Eee derives from "the three Es", an abbreviation of its advertising slogan for the device: "Easy to learn, Easy to work, Easy to play".

In January 2013, ASUS officially ended production of their Eee PC series, citing declining sales due to consumers favoring tablets and Ultrabooks over netbooks. However, they subsequently restarted the line with the release of the EeeBook series in 2014.

== History ==
=== Eee 700 series ===
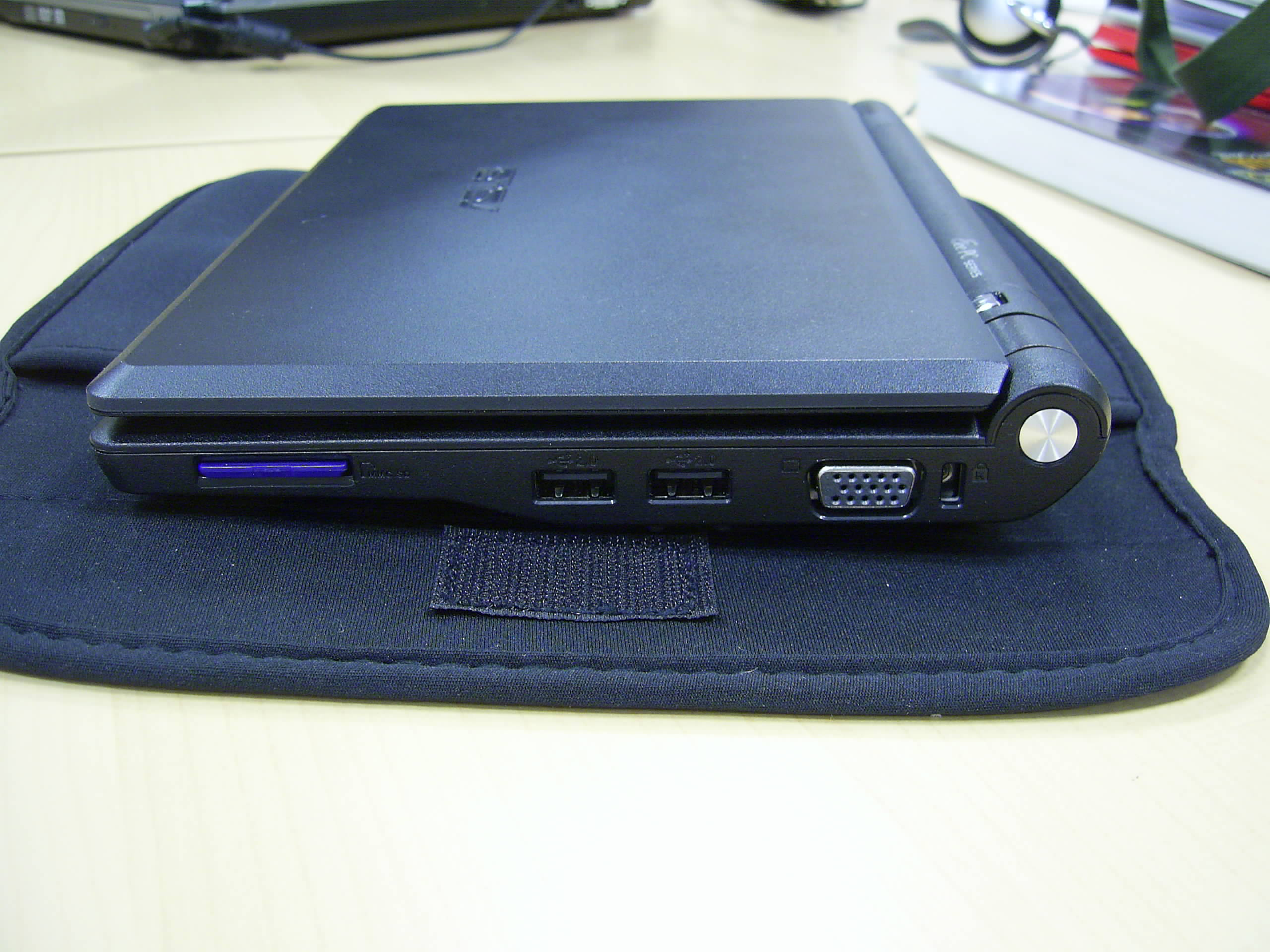
Black 700 series unit side view showing the SD card reader, two USB ports, the VGA output and the Kensington Security Slot

ASUS announced two Eee PC models at Computex Taipei 2007: the 701 and the 1001. The 701 base model Eee PC 4G was released on 16 October 2007 in Taiwan. Three additional models followed.

Both the price and the size of the device are small in comparison with similar ultra-mobile PCs. The Eee series is a response to the XO-1 notebook from the One Laptop per Child initiative. At the Intel Developer Forum 2007, Asus demonstrated the Classmate PC and the Eee PC, and listed specifications for four models of the Eee PC.

In some countries, the products have the marketing names EeePC 8G, 4G, 4G Surf, and 2G Surf, though in other countries the machines are still designated by the model numbers 700 and 701. The 4G Surf uses socketed RAM but some revisions do not have a door to access the slot.

ASUS released a version of the Eee PC with Microsoft Windows XP pre-installed in January 2008. In Japan, the version is known as the 4G-X.

Some early 700-series models drained the battery approximately 10% per day when the unit was completely powered off and not plugged in, thus emptying the battery even when not in use.

==== User modifications ====
Some users of the 701 physically modified the machine to replace the 4 GB solid state drive.

The 8 GB versions of the 700 series leave the SSD area on the motherboard empty and connect their SSD as an internal PCI Express Mini Card. Replacing the SSD requires only an SSD compatible with the connector. The SSD area on the motherboard may also be used to install other devices, accommodate physically larger SSDs, or even hard-solder an SSD salvaged from a 2 GB or 4 GB 700 model. As this requires only soldering on a new device without removing an old one, the risk of doing so may be acceptable to some users.

=== Eee 900 series ===
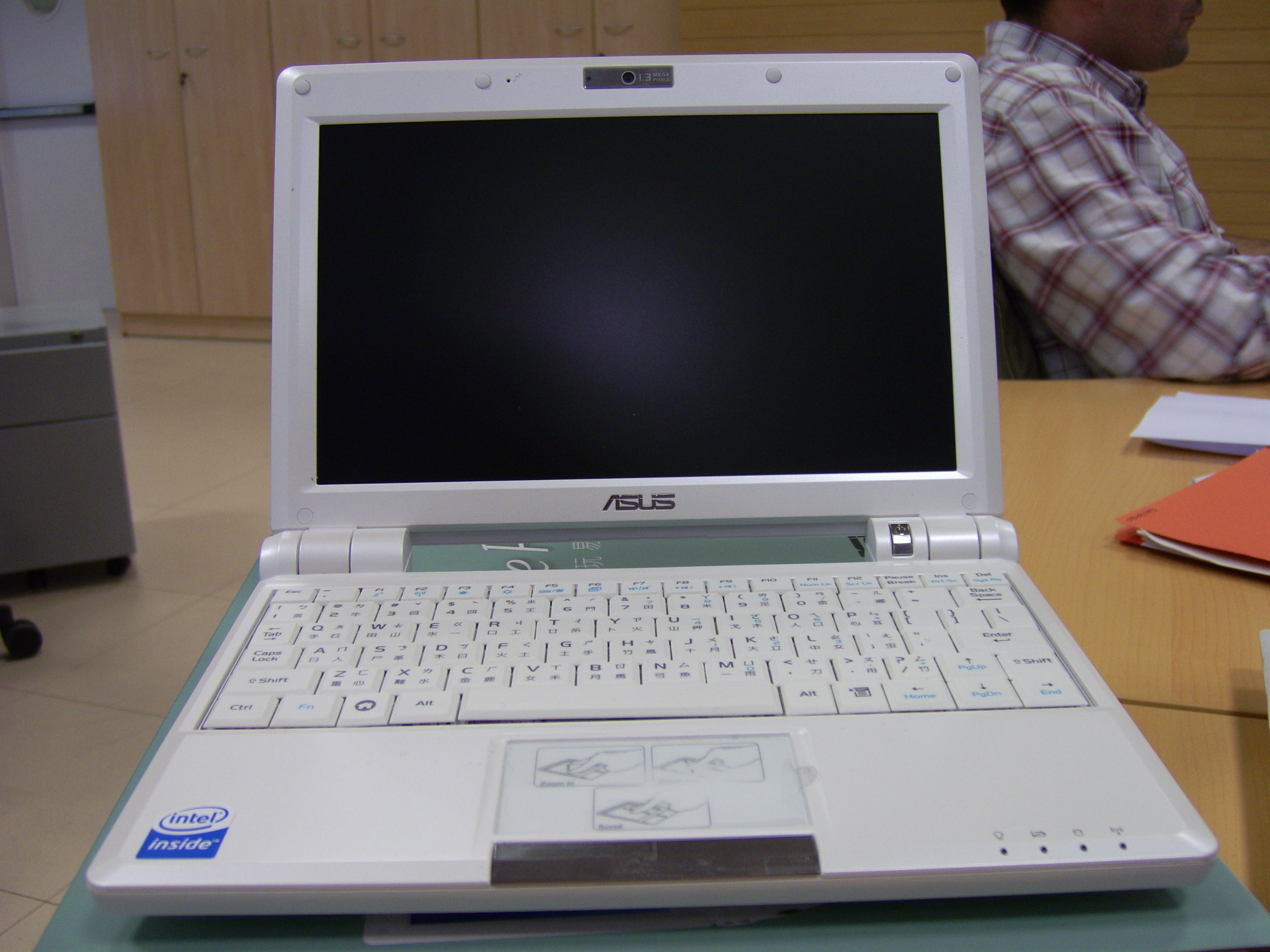
White 900 series

The Eee 900 series was launched in Hong Kong on 16 April 2008, and in the UK on 1 May 2008 for £329 (approximately 410 € or 650 US$ including VAT). It was launched in the US on 12 May 2008. The Eee 900 series dimensions are a little larger than the 70x models–measuring 225 × 165 × 35 mm (WxDxH) (8.8" × 6.5" × 1.4") and weighing around 1 kg (2.2 lb). The machine has a multi-touch touchpad allowing two-finger scroll and zoom via a "pinch" gesture, and is available with Linux and/or MS Windows XP configurations, depending on the market.

The Intel Atom version is named the EeePC 900a and comes with an 8GB or 16 GB SSD. Some of these Eee PCs also have a 4 GB SSD installed similarly to that in the 701 for a total storage space of 20GB. Those that do not are named the Asus EEE 900 16G. The Windows XP version is named the EeePC 900 Win and also comes in two versions: one with a total storage of 12 GB (one 4 GB SSD and one 8 GB SSD) and one with 16 GB (on a single SSD). The Linux 20G version is sold for the same price as the Windows 12G version. In the case of the 16G EEEs, the Windows version costs more than the Linux version.

The Windows version comes with Microsoft Works and Windows Live Suite preinstalled. It also includes StarSuite 8. The machines are otherwise identical to each other with 1 GB of RAM, an 8.9-inch (226 mm) 1024×600 LCD and a 1.3-megapixel webcam. This model has the same Intel Celeron CPU as the Eee PC 700, running at its full 900 MHz clock speed (rather than the 630 MHz speed seen in the Eee PC 700).

==== Other Eee 90x models ====
On 3 June 2008, Asus unveiled the Eee 901 at Computex Taipei. It was a revision of the 900 series with a different chassis. The 901 features an Intel Atom Diamondville CPU clocked at 1.6 GHz, an "expanded" battery (listed as 6-cell), and "Super Hybrid Engine" software for power management which will provide a battery life of 4.2-7.8 hours. Bluetooth and 802.11n Wi-Fi are also included. The 901 uses the Intel 945GME chipset, meeting the requirements for Windows Vista or 7 Aero. The 901 is otherwise similar to the 900, shipping in Linux or Windows XP configurations with flash memory storage of different sizes. It was discovered that the Eee 901 has capacity for a "3GCard" upgrade.

The Eee PC 900D has 8GB flash memory and Windows XP preinstalled.

The Eee PC 904HD was one of the first Eee PC models which features an 80 GB HDD instead of an SSD. It features an Intel Celeron M running at 900 MHz and gets power from a 6-cell battery. Like other Eee PC 90x models, it features 802.11 b/g WLAN and a 1.3M pixel webcam. Windows XP comes pre-installed.

The Eee PC 904HA's dimensions are 266 mm(W) × 191.2 mm(D) × 28.5 mm~ 38 mm(H). The 8.9-inch screen has a native resolution size of 1024×600 pixels (WSVGA). The CPU is an Intel Atom N270 @ 1.6 GHz, and the standard model came with 1 GB DDR2 RAM occupying the single memory slot. The 160 GB Hard Disk Drive had Microsoft Windows XP Home pre-installed. Also standard are the 6-cell battery, the 1.3M pixel webcam and integrated microphone, and both Ethernet and Wi-Fi 802.11 b/g network connections.

The Eee PC 900A features almost the same specs as the Eee PC 901 (except the primary SSD, Bluetooth, 1.3M pixel webcam and the 6-cell battery, that has been replaced by a 4-cell battery), but in a case nearly the same as used in the Eee PC 900 model.

On 17 June 2009, Asus released the Disney Netpal (Eee PC MK90), which is similar to the Eee 90x models.

==== Battery controversy ====
There was some controversy regarding the battery supplied with the EeePC 900. Versions pre-released to many non-UK journalists and reviewers were equipped with a 5800 mAh battery, but the first retail versions in Hong Kong, the United Kingdom and Singapore were shipped with a smaller, 4400 mAh (76% of that capacity) battery, which commentators note has led to a great variation in the machine's battery life in reviews, in some cases as much as 90 minutes. As a result of the objections to this, Asus provided a free battery replacement program in Hong Kong and Singapore, and ran a paid-for battery exchange program in the UK.

Asus has stated that the smaller battery is "presently the standard battery supplied in the UK" and "the default standard battery pack for Asus Eee PC 900 worldwide". Asus provided a battery exchange to all UK Eee PC 900 customers for £10, and released a firmware update which claimed to extend battery life by 30 minutes ("BIOS 0601: Updated all battery discharge tables to extend battery life").

In Australia and Italy, the situation was reversed: Reviewers received EeePC 900 systems fitted with the 4400 mAh battery but the retail models were equipped with the 5800 mAh battery. Customers of Media Markt in Italy received the EeePC 900 at the beginning of sales (May/June) with a 5800 mAh battery and later (June/July) with a 4400 mAh battery.

Best Buy's custom variants of the 1000HD and 900A also both include a 4400 mAh battery.

Part of the above problem extends from the fact that the entire range was substantially more successful than Asus had originally anticipated. Asus has several large complexes scattered throughout Taiwan and China, with the largest in the city of Suzhou (China), being the size of eight football fields. Upon the unexpected success of the range, Asus factories worked around the clock to keep up supply and further development. Consequently, even within Asus testing labs in Taipei, many variations were found within test models. Generally, however, Asus does inform reviewers that the final retail model may contain different features from those offered in the review model.

=== Eee PC 1000 series ===
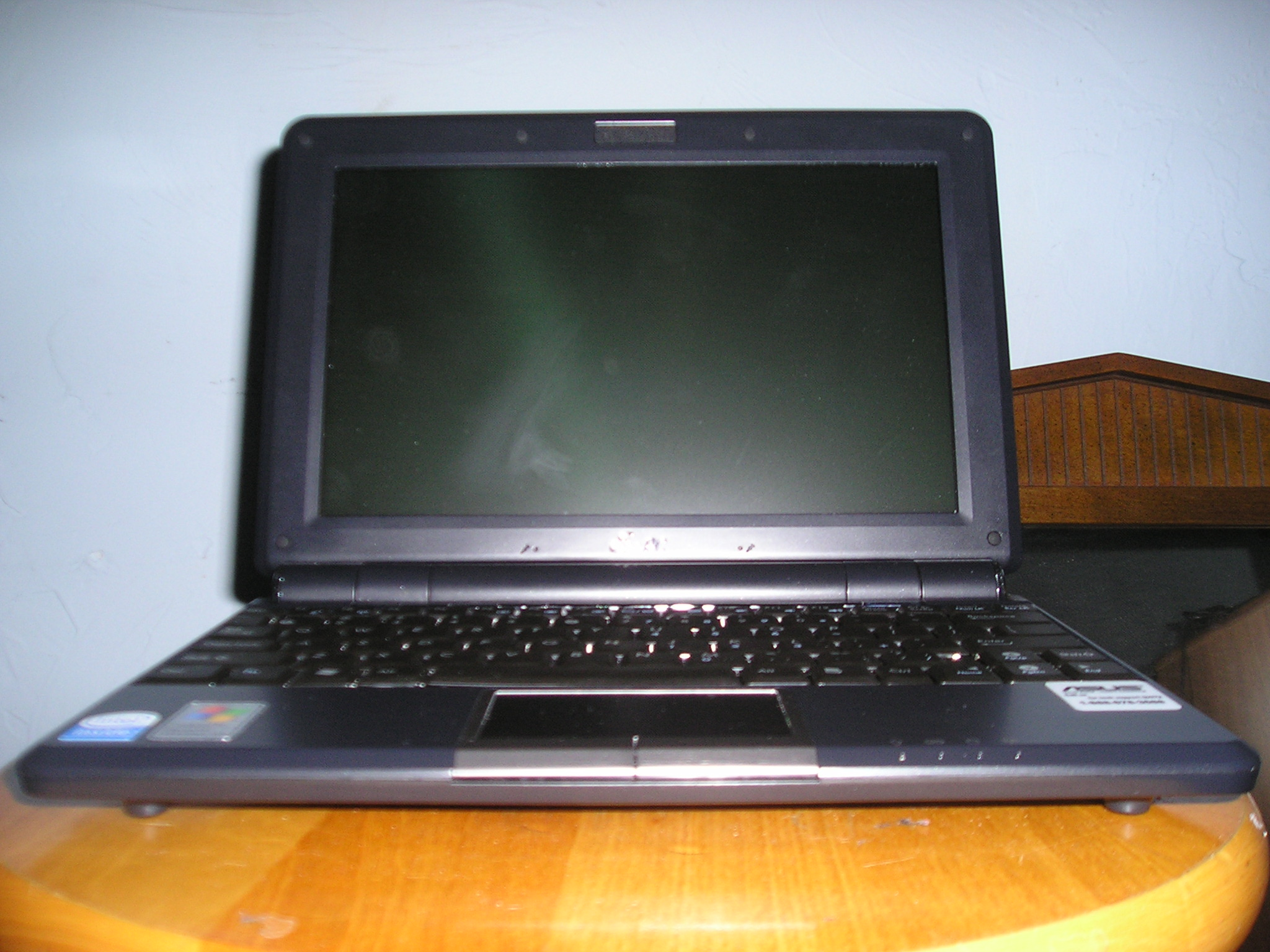
Black 1000 series; 1000HD model shown

The 1000 series launched at Computex Taipei on 3 June 2008. It featured a new 10-inch (254 mm) screen and a 1.6 GHz Intel Atom CPU, although built-in power management software can increase the speed to 1.7 GHz. The 1000 model shipped with Linux, an 8 GB SSD and a 32 GB SSD (totalling 40 GB); the 1000H model shipped with Windows XP Home or Linux and an 80 or 160 GB SATA HDD. Both the 1000 and the 1000H support up to 2 GB of DDR2 RAM of 667 MHz clock speed. The 1000 has a rated battery life of 4.2–7.5 hours, while the 1000H is rated for 3.2–7 hours. It also offers a keyboard that is 92% the size of generic notebooks, aiming to make it more comfortable to type. Like the Eee PC 901, the new machines feature 802.11n Wi-Fi and Bluetooth. WiMAX is not supported.

The 1000HD (released in September 2008) is a slightly cheaper version of the 1000 series. It features the same specifications as the 1000H, except it uses a 900 MHz Celeron CPU chip.

The 1000HA (released in October 2008) also costs less than the 1000H, but has the same Intel Atom 1.6 GHz CPU, a 160 GB HDD, and 1 GB of RAM. It also has wireless and on some models, Bluetooth.

The 1000XPH has the same Intel Atom 1.6 GHz CPU, an 80 GB HDD, and 1 GB of RAM. Other amenities include 10/100 LAN and 802.11 b/g Wireless LAN adapters, an integrated webcam, but no Bluetooth. The 1000HG features a Huawei 3G-Modem.

In February 2009, Asus unveiled the 1000HE, using the new Intel Atom 280 processor, with a 10-inch LED-lit display at 1024x600 physical but 1024x768 virtual, 6-cell battery with an advertised 9.5 hours of battery life, 160 GB HDD running at 5400RPM, Bluetooth, 802.11n wireless networking, 1.3-megapixel camera, and revised keyboard similar to Apple's keyboards.

Although the screen resolution on the 1000 series is 1024x600, it has pixel mapping (memory addressing) which covers a virtual 1024x768 desktop. One could choose with a simple Fn key combination what graphics mode to operate in: either 800x600, 1024x600 (native resolution), virtual 1024x768 compressed (vertically compressed into 600 space), and 1024x768 with panning. The latter mode would display only 660 vertical pixels at a time, but as the pointer approached the top or bottom of the screen the display content would shift the "hidden" pixels into view to better display certain websites. It also freed more screen real estate for other tasks, such as web browsing or office applications, by allowing the user to move some things, like the top empty grey window frame area (otherwise wasted) off-screen. A similar panning effect can be achieved on other Linux systems using xrandr.

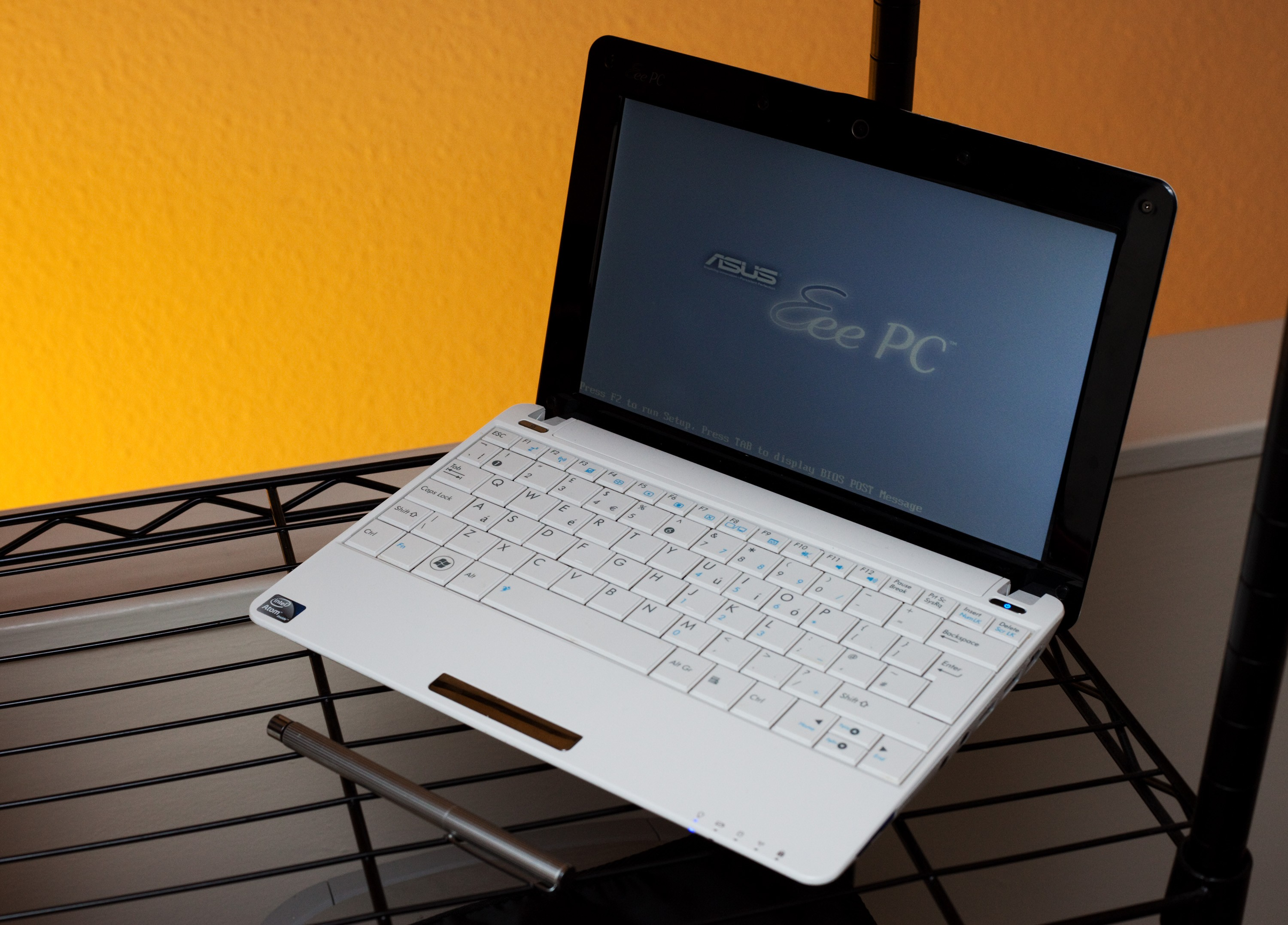
Asus 1005HA-V, with "seashell" design; the screen hinges to sit behind the base

At CeBIT 2009, Asus unveiled the 10-inch EEE 1005HA, introducing the new design concept "Seashell".

The 1005HA comes in three models. From least to most expensive, they are the 1005HA-B, the 1005HA-V and the 1005HA-P. The 1005HA-B has a removable 3-cell battery with a rated 4-hour life per charge, a 1.3-megapixel camera, and uses the N270 processor. At the higher end, the 1005HA-P has a removable 6-cell, 5600 mAh, 63 Wh battery with rated 10.5 hour battery life, a 1.3-megapixel camera and uses the N280 processor. There is also a 1005HA-H model, sold in Poland, equipped with a 6-cell battery, an N270 processor and a 0.3-megapixel camera.

Asus officially announced the first Eee with Nvidia Ion graphics, the 1201N, on 19 November 2009, later replaced by the 1201PN and 1201NL and the 1215N, with a more powerful Atom D525 dual-core processor and Ion 2 graphics.

The 1215 series then saw the release of the 1215B, which came with an E-450/E-350/C30/C50/C60 processor, a "Zacate" APU. The 1215B has USB 3.0 ports, as well as a CPU and BIOS that support full hardware virtualization in both Linux (via KVM, Xen, VirtualBox, VMware) and Windows (via XP mode, VirtualBox, VMware). The 1215B is the first of the Eee PC line of computers that supports virtualization. The 1215B was subsequently replaced by the upgraded 1225B, which replaced the E350 APU of the previous model with the E-450 APU which provides a minor speed bump to the CPU and turbocore for the GPU.

=== Eee 1025c and 1025ce ===
These were released in 2012 and described as the last in the line of the Asus Eee PC series. With only 1 GB memory, standard USB2 ports and sluggish performance, these were not especially notable releases other than for their exceptional battery life. Other reported problems are the lack of a hatch to access the memory, so RAM cannot be upgraded without breaking open the case; also, there is a single mono speaker rather than dual stereo speakers.

=== Eee 1015 series ===
In 2013 Asus restarted the Eee PC series with the 1015E models, some of which are on Windows 8 and some on Ubuntu Linux. These come with 2 GB memory and USB3 ports.

The 1015E fixes some of the problems with the 1025C by using a faster processor, 2GB memory and stereo speakers. The RAM is soldered in place and cannot be upgraded. Due to improved performance, the battery life is shorter than that of the 1025 series. It is possible to reduce the processor clock speed to increase battery life.

=== EeeBook ===
Further Information: Asus EeeBook

In 2014 Asus relaunched the Eee PC with the EeeBook lineup of computers, starting with the X205TA model. By 2017 the EeeBook lineup was succeeded by the Asus VivoBook E Series. Some EeeBook laptops were rebranded to VivoBook E Series laptops; the EeeBook E202 was rebranded to the VivoBook E202, ending the EeeBook lineup again. The EeeBook lineup consists of the E202 (E202SA), E502 (E502SA and E502MA) and X205 (X205TA).

== Hardware ==
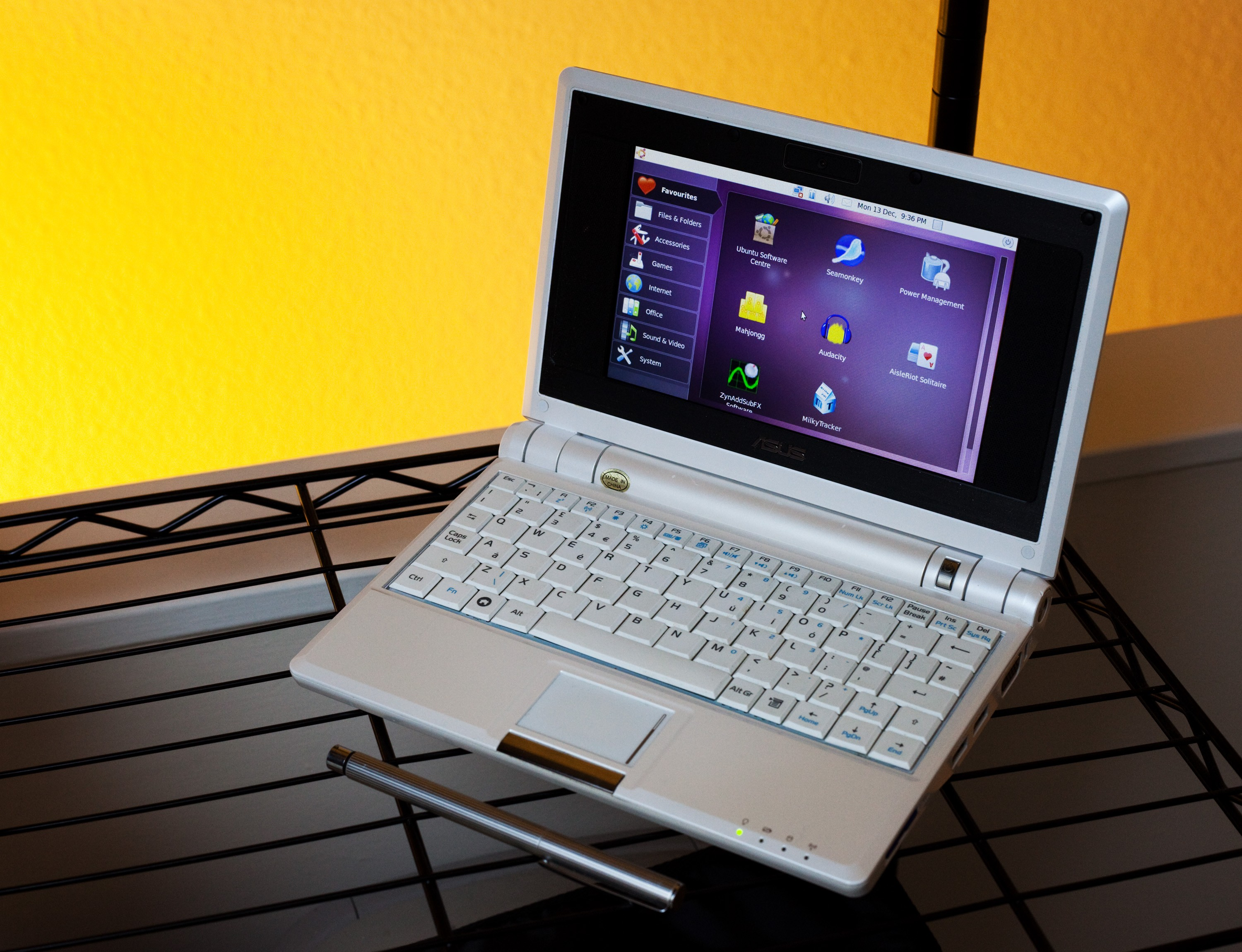
Asus Eee PC 701, with fountain pen for scale, running Ubuntu Netbook Edition

=== Rechargeable CMOS battery ===
Asus Eee PC series models 1005HA, 1005HAB, 1008HA, and others use Varta ML1220 or equivalent Maxell, Sanyo and Panasonic ML1220 lithium ion coin cell rechargeable batteries, terminated with a two-pin Molex connector plug.

=== Processor ===
Eee PC models have typically used netbook specific processors or ultra-low voltage versions of mainstream processors. The earliest Eee PC models used a 900 MHz Intel Celeron M processor underclocked to 630 MHz. Later models shipped with Intel Atom and AMD Fusion processors.

=== Display ===
The Eee PC 700 has an 800×480 pixel, 7 inch (178 mm) display, measured diagonally. The screen does not cover the entire space within the lid; instead it is flanked on the sides by stereo speakers, and above by the (optional) camera in the trim at the top. The Eee PC 900 and 901 come with a 1024×600 pixel 8.9-inch (226 mm) display, almost filling the lid.

Later models came with 10 inch to 12.1 inch displays and up to 1366×768 resolution.

With all models, an external display can be supported through a standard VGA connector. On some early models this connector lacks the screws to secure it to the Eee PC, which some consider a safety precaution. The manufacturer does not give any specifications on maximum resolution and display configuration (mirroring, extended desktop), but most models can handle an external display at native resolution of 1400×1050, and even 1600×900, although performance starts to slow down. Models that ship with Xandros do not have access to the full capacity of the external VGA output by default, allowing only 'mirroring'. Users must reconfigure their xorg.conf file, or install a more recent OS to allow the higher resolution output.

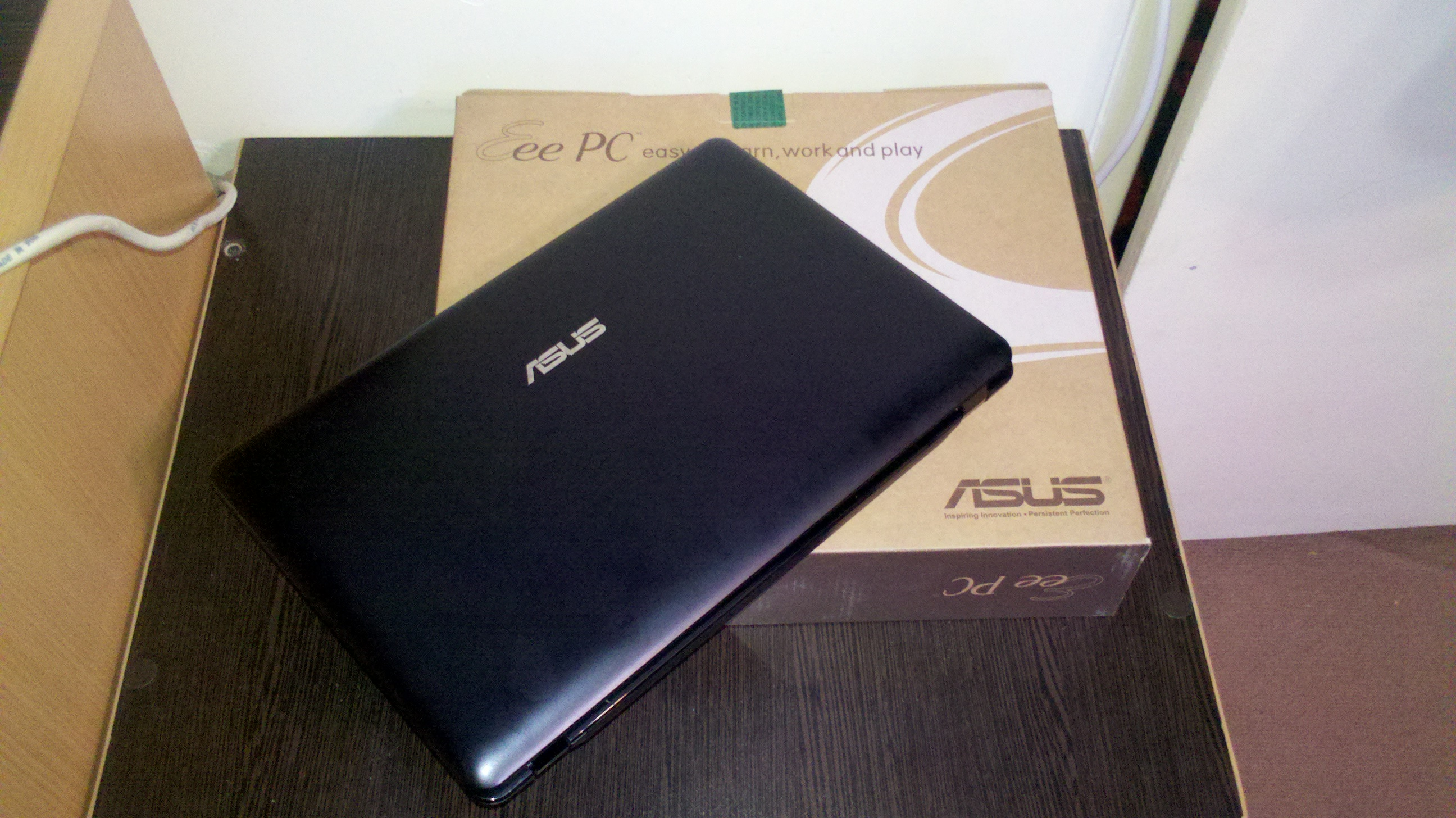
Asus Eee PC 1215P Seashell with a dual-core Intel CPU (N570) and a 12.1" HD display

The EEE PC900 has a tendency for the display to fail with black blobs due to air leakage. This is repairable but depending on exact replacement unit sometimes needs the eight-pin EEPROM moved from the old display to the new one, and a single track linked to regain picture and brightness control after the new one is fitted.

=== Keyboard ===
On a normal, full size computer keyboard, the 10 keys Q–P measure 190 mm (7.48 in). The 700 and 900 series are equipped with similar keyboards; these are 82% of the size of a generic one, meaning that the Q–P keys measure 155 mm (6.10 in). The 1000 series, as it fits in a more spacious case, has 92% of a full size keyboard, where the Q–P keys measure 175 mm (6.89 in).

Some Eee PC lines such as the 1000HE and 1215s uses the island-style keyboard, similar to keyboards used in Apple computers and Sony's VAIO series, where the keys are reminiscent of Scrabble tiles, being spaced apart and raised from the surface below.

=== Storage ===
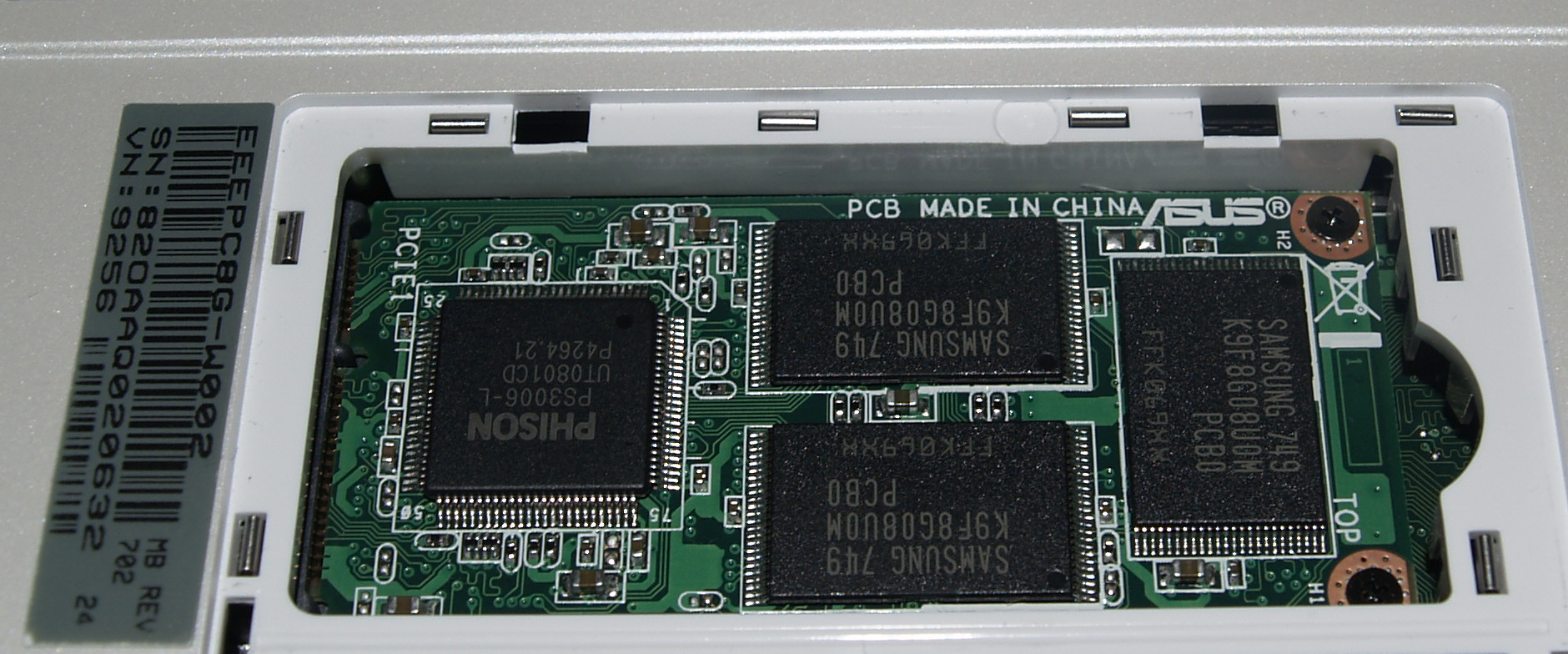
Removable 8 GB SSD in Eee PC

The early model Eee PCs use a solid-state drive for storage (instead of a hard drive), which consumes less power when in use, allows the device to boot faster, generates no noise, and is less susceptible to mechanical shock damage than hard drives. A downside of SSD storage (flash memory) is that an individual sector can be written only about 200,000 times. This problem can be partially mitigated by intelligent wear leveling, resulting in a MTBF similar to conventional platter-based hard drives.

The SSDs used in early Eee PCs also had extremely poor random write performance; the S101 does not have this problem.

In the 2 GB and 4 GB models of the 700 series of the Eee PC, the SSD is permanently soldered to the board. In the 8 GB model, the SSD is a card connected via the internal PCI Express Mini Card connector, leaving the original SSD area on the motherboard empty.

The Eee PC 900 comes with a removable PCI Express Mini SSD module, with or without four additional 1 GB memory chips soldered on the main board. Different models come with different-sized SSDs. One Linux version has 4 GB, a MS Windows XP version has 8 GB, and all remaining ones, MS Windows XP or Linux, have 16 GB.

The Eee PC 1000 contains a fast 8 GB internal SSD and a slower 32 GB internal flash drive.

Some models, such as the 1000H and 904HD, do not have a SSD, and instead have a SATA internal hard drive of either 80 or 160 GB, which can be upgraded by the user.

All Eee PC models also include a memory card reader, supporting SD, SDHC and MMC cards for additional storage, while the Eee PC S101 also has support for Memorystick and MS-PRO.

Eee PC 1004DN is the first model with a Super-Multi optical disc drive (ODD) that reads and writes data to DVD or compact disc.

=== Memory ===
Most early Eee PCs use 533/667 MHz DDR2 SDRAM via a standard SO-DIMM module, which can be swapped out. The 700 and 701SDX have RAM soldered to the motherboard. Other models (like the white 4GS-W010) lacked memory access panels and required disassembly to upgrade memory.

Later models, such as the black model EEEPC 4G SURF (4GS-PK008), and newer white models (4GS-W010), have a removable panel on the underside that allows the user to change the RAM without fully disassembling the system.

Asus reverted to soldering RAM directly onto the mainboard in their later releases of the Eee PC range. The Asus technical data for the 1025c and 1025ce models is seen as erroneous by certain online retailers offering RAM upgrades.

=== Cooling ===
In an EE380 talk, an Asus engineer mentioned that the Eee PC uses the keyboard shielding as a heat sink to absorb the heat generated by the processor. Three chips need heatsinking, and this is achieved by heat-conductive adhesive pads which sit between the chip heatsink flats and the keyboard shield and connect them thermally. It is important to ensure that the heatsink pads are replaced correctly after maintenance such as cleaning or replacing the fan. The Eee PC has a fan and vents to cool off the system.

== Operating systems (software user environment) ==
Most Eee PC models were shipped with either Windows XP or a Linux distribution called Xandros. Later models (e.g. 1015E) ship with Windows 7 Starter or Ubuntu installed.

Users have tried to install various other operating systems on Eee PCs. The following are known to work on most models:

- Linux, especially Lubuntu, Debian, Alpine, Salix, SliTaz, PepperMint <6, Bodhi 4.x, and other Linuxes still available in 32bit and employing an interface (environment) with a small memory-footprint
- ChromeOS and Android x86
- Mac OS X: v10.4, v10.5 and v10.6
- Microsoft Windows XP
- EasyPeasy Linux (custom for the eeePC, now discontinued but still available for download)
- Windows Vista, 7, 8, 8.1 and 10

Some of the above operating systems, while they may have been available, and some barely worked sluggishly, are no longer up to date. Some have even been discontinued or now only offer 64bit versions which are not compatible with the eeePC series.

== Specifications ==
Eee PC models
Component		700 (2G Surf)	701 (4G Surf)	701 (4G)^{[I]}	701SD	702 8G	900	900 16G	900SD	900HD	900A	901	MK90H	904HD	1000HD	1000H	1000HA	1000	1002HA	1000HE	1005HA-P	1008HA	1101HA	1201HA	1201N	1215b	1025c	1215N
Display	Diagonal	7 in (17.8 cm)					8.9 in (22.6 cm)								10.2 in (25.9 cm)								11.6 in (29.5 cm)	12.1 in (30.7 cm)			10.1 in (25.65 cm)	
Display	Resolution (pixels×pixels)	800×480 (WVGA)					1024×600 (WSVGA)							1024×600 (WSVGA)									1366×768 (WXGA)				1024x600 (WSVGA)	1366×768 (WXGA)
Display	Type	TFT LCD with LED backlight																										
Storage	SSD soldered (GB)	2	4	4			4		8	16GB "Eee Storage" Cache	8 or 4 (US) or 0 (US/DE)	4 (removable)						8 (removable)										
Storage	SSD removable (GB)				8		8 (Windows XP) or 16 (Linux)	16	Only insertable if WLAN removed		16 or 8 (DE), 0 (US), or 4 (US)	8 (Windows XP) or 16 (Windows XP/Linux)						32										
Storage	HDD (GB)				30 external in some markets					160			160	80	80 or 160		160		160		250 / 320						320	
CPU	Model	Intel Celeron M ULV 353									Intel Atom N270 (45 nm Diamondville, Socket 437 FCBG8A)			Intel Celeron-M ULV 353		Intel Atom N270 (45 nm Diamondville, Socket 437 FCBG8A)				Intel Atom N280 (45 nm Diamondville, Socket 437 FCBG8A)			Intel Atom Z520		Intel Atom 330	AMD C-50 or E-350	Intel Atom N2800	
CPU	Frequency (MHz)	800 @ 571	900	900 @ 630 (70 MHz × 9)			900				1600			900 @ 630 (70 MHz × 9)		1600				1660			1330		1600	1000 or 1600	1860	1800
CPU	L1 cache	32 kB																							2 x 32 kB - 8-way set associative		2 x 56kB 8-way associative	
CPU	L2 cache	512 kB - 8-way set associative																							2 × 512 kB - 8-way set associative		2 × 512 kB - 8-way set associative	
Memory (GB)	Default amount	0.5	0.5			1						1 (Windows XP), 1 or 2 (Linux)	1	1 (Windows XP), 1 or 2 (Linux)	1								1			2	1	2
Memory (GB)	and type	DDR2-400 onboard	DDR2-533/667			DDR2-400, supports 533/667						DDR2-400, supports 533		DDR2-400, supports 533/667	DDR2-533/667								DDR2-667/800			DDR3-1333	DDR3-1066	DDR3-SDRAM
Memory (GB)	Sockets (max. upgrade)	256 MB or 512 MB soldered RAM	1 (2 GB)						Not upgradeable	1 (2 GB)														1 (4 GB)	2 (4 GB)	2 (8 Gb)	2	
Graphics		Integrated GMA 900 (SMA), VGA port (up to 1600×1280 pixels)									Integrated GMA 950				Integrated GMA 900	Integrated GMA 950							Integrated GMA 500		Nvidia Ion	Integrated Radeon HD 6250 GPU	Integrated GMA 3600	NVIDIA Ion 2
Chipset			Intel 910GML				Intel 915GM/GMS, 910GML Express				Intel 945GSE				Intel 910GML + ICH6M	Intel 945GSE + ICH7M			Intel 945GSE + ICH7M				Intel Poulsbo US15W		Nvidia Ion	Fusion Controller	Intel NM10 + ICH7	
Battery	Cells	4										6	4	6					2	6		4	6				3 or 6	6
Battery	Capacity (Ah)	4.4		4.4 or 5.2						4.4	4.4 or 5.8	6.6		6.6					4.2	8.7								
Battery	Voltage (V)	7.4		7.4						7.4	7.4 or 7.2		7.4					7.4	7.4									
Battery	Approx. run time (h:m)	2:45		Unknown or 3:30							No info or 3:30	4:15–7:45		4:15–7:45					5:00	9:30							6:00 or 12:00	6
Battery	Type	Li-ion												Li-ion					Lithium-polymer								Lithium-Ion	Lithium-Ion (Li-Ion)
Camera (Mpixels)		No	No	0.3	0.3	0.3	1.3	1.3	0.3	1.3	0.3, or none	1.3	1.3								0.3 or 1.3 (on HA models)	1.3	0.3				0.3	
Size (mm)	Width	225										248	265.9					264	266								262	
Size (mm)	Depth	165					170					175.3	173	191.3					181	191.2							178	
Size (mm)	Height	~21–35					~20–38					22.9	c. 24–28.7	38.1					27.6	c. 28.5-38							34.4	
Weight (g)		922					990					1,140	1,100	1,400	1,450			1,330	1,200	1,450	1,270				1,460		1,100 or 1,250	1.64
Network adapters	LAN (Mbit/s)	10/100 (Attansic L2)																		10/100					10/100/1000		10/100 (Atheros AR8152)	10/100
Network adapters	WiFi (802.11)	b/g mini PCI-E card (Atheros- or Ralink-based).										b/g/n mini PCI-E card Eee PC 901/1000: Ralink RT2860.												b/g/n		b/g/n mini PCI-E card Broadcom BCM4313	b/g/n (Atheros AR9485)	Broadcom 47xx
Bluetooth		No										Yes	No			Yes	No	Yes							Yes		No	Yes
OS	Linux	Xandros^{[II]} running KDE and IceWM							No		Xandros^{[II]}		No	Xandros^{[II]}			No	Yes	No									
OS	Windows	Windows XP Home Edition																							Windows 7 Home Premium/Starter Edition			
Other	Audio	Realtek ALC662 Hi-Definition Audio 5.1 codec; built-in stereo speakers; built-in microphone								Realtek ALC662 Hi-Definition Audio 5.1 codec; built-in stereo speakers; built-in microphone; Dolby Sound Room	Realtek ALC662 Hi-Definition Audio 5.1 codec; built-in stereo speakers; built-in microphone																Realtek Hi-Definition Audio codec, built-in stereo speaker, built-in microphone	
Other	Connectors	3 × USB 2.0 ports (except model 1005PX (=? 1000HA or 1005HA ?; 1001 on mother board and 1005PX on the back sticker (doesn't have bluetooth either)) : only 2 ports), MMC/SD (HC) card reader, Ethernet port, modem port (non-functional, empty), microphone input, headphone jack, AC power jack, VGA out, Kensington lock slot.																									2 x USB 2.0, 1 x USB 3.0 (optional), MMC/SD (HC) card reader, Ethernet port, combo jack, AC power, VGA out, HDMI out, Kensington lock slot.	
Other	Colors	Pearl white (pure white for Surf models) or galaxy black; lush green, sky blue, blush pink (spring 2008)																									Grey	
Other	Expansion	2 × PCI Express Mini Card connectors: 1 occupied by the wireless network card; 1 empty, accessible on some models from opening on back of unit, which supports only Asus-approved SSD expansion units. The second PCIE connection is unavailable on many current-generation Eee PCs and some older models.																										

^I. In the UK, the Eee is also promoted as the RM Asus Minibook, which is targeted at students; however, the unit itself is no different.
^II. 701 4G (non-Surf) late releases have Windows XP pre-installed without Microsoft Works and Windows Live Suite, excluding the disc, or either Xandros OS pre-installed.

=== Configurations ===
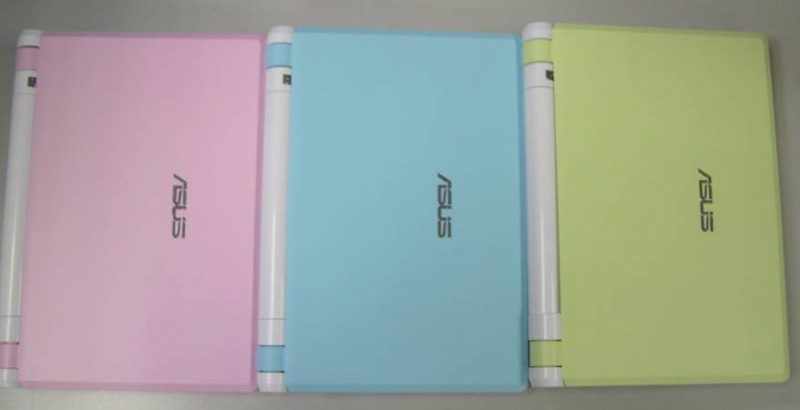
The 700 series units were shipped in three colors besides black and white.

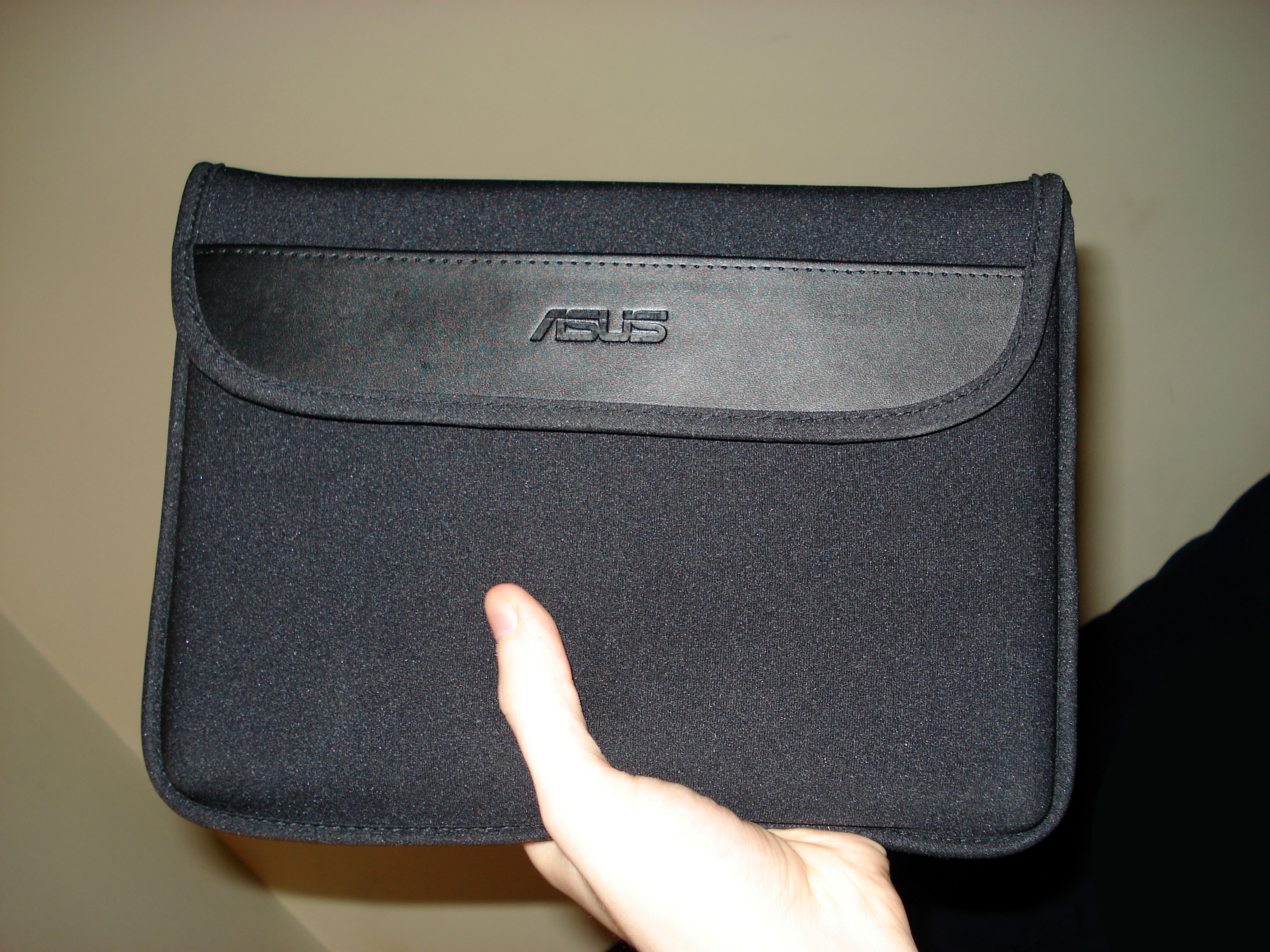
EeePC in its case

Naming of the 700 series of models of the device appears to relate to the size of installed SSD, camera, and battery size. The Eee PC Surf models include the 4400 mAh battery pack and no webcam, while the non-Surf models have the 5200 mAh battery pack and a webcam installed. The model numbers (700, 701) may still be the same as has been seen on pre-production samples. Asus may offer upgrades for the SSD storage via the empty Mini PCIe slot, which has been shown to be labeled FLASH_CON in take-apart photos of the 4G. When a Mini PCIe card is inserted into the spare empty slot, the internal SSD is disabled, making the device unable to boot from the original SSD. There are also signal lines for a USB port on the Mini PCIe pins which have been used to connect various USB devices internally. Some 701 models with serial numbers starting at 7B do not have a second mini PCIe slot soldered onto the motherboard, though the circuit traces and solder pads remain.

In the 70x series, the pre-installed Xandros operating system has a Linux kernel with a kernel option set limiting the detected RAM size to a maximum of 1 GB, even if a larger RAM module is installed. The actual capacity is shown in full in the BIOS setup and under other OSes. However, it is possible to recompile the kernel with support for more RAM.

The 900 and later laptops had the kernel pre-configured to support up to 4 GB of memory address space.

== See also ==
- Asus EeeBox PC
- Asus Eee Top
- CMOS battery
- Comparison of netbooks
- Comparison of netbook-oriented Linux distributions
- Internet appliance
- Rechargeable battery
