= Asus Eee =

Product family

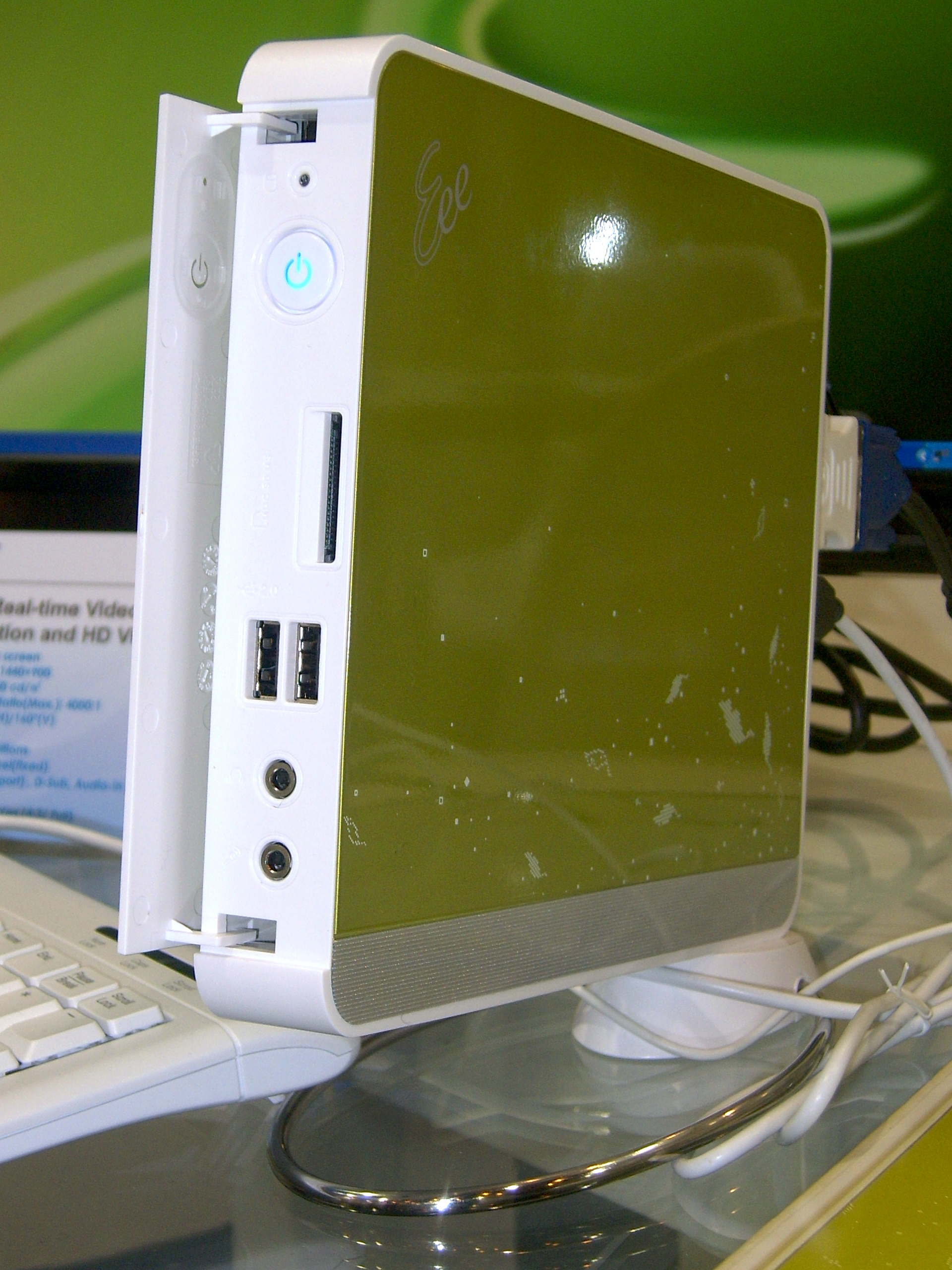
Asus EeeBox PC white with customized skin

Asus Eee is a discontinued family of products by AsusTek Computer Inc. The product family began with the release of the Eee PC subnotebook in 2007; since then, the product family has diversified into a number of PC form factors. According to the company, the name Eee derives from "the three Es," an abbreviation of its advertising slogan for the device: "Easy to learn, Easy to work, Easy to play".

== Eee PC ==
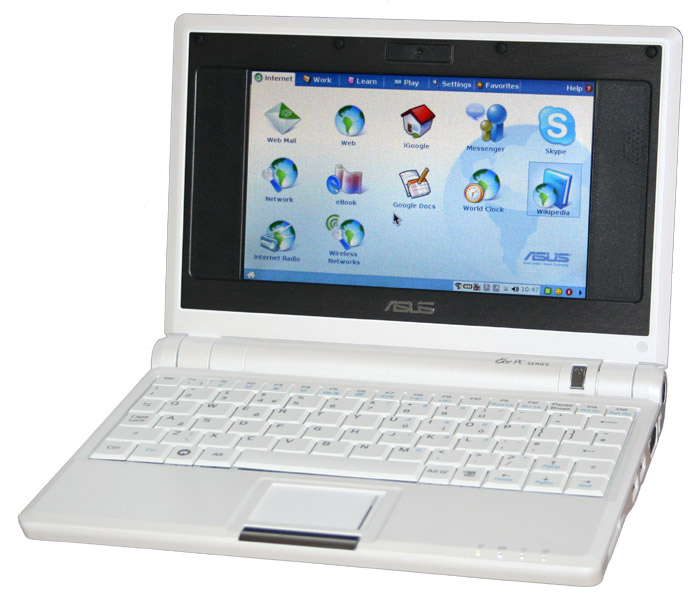
ASUS Eee PC

The Asus Eee PC is a subnotebook/netbook computer. At the time of its introduction in fall 2007, it was noted for its combination of a lightweight, Linux-based operating system, solid-state drive and relatively low cost. Newer models have added the option of the Windows 7 operating system, dual-core Intel Atom CPUs, and traditional hard disk drives, and have also increased in price, though they remain relatively inexpensive as laptops, and notably inexpensive for ultra-small laptops.

== EeeBox PC ==
Asus EeeBox PC is a nettop (desktop for the internet) counterpart to the Asus Eee PC netbook (notebook for the internet). Its motherboard employs Splashtop technology called "ExpressGate" by Asus.

== Eee Top ==
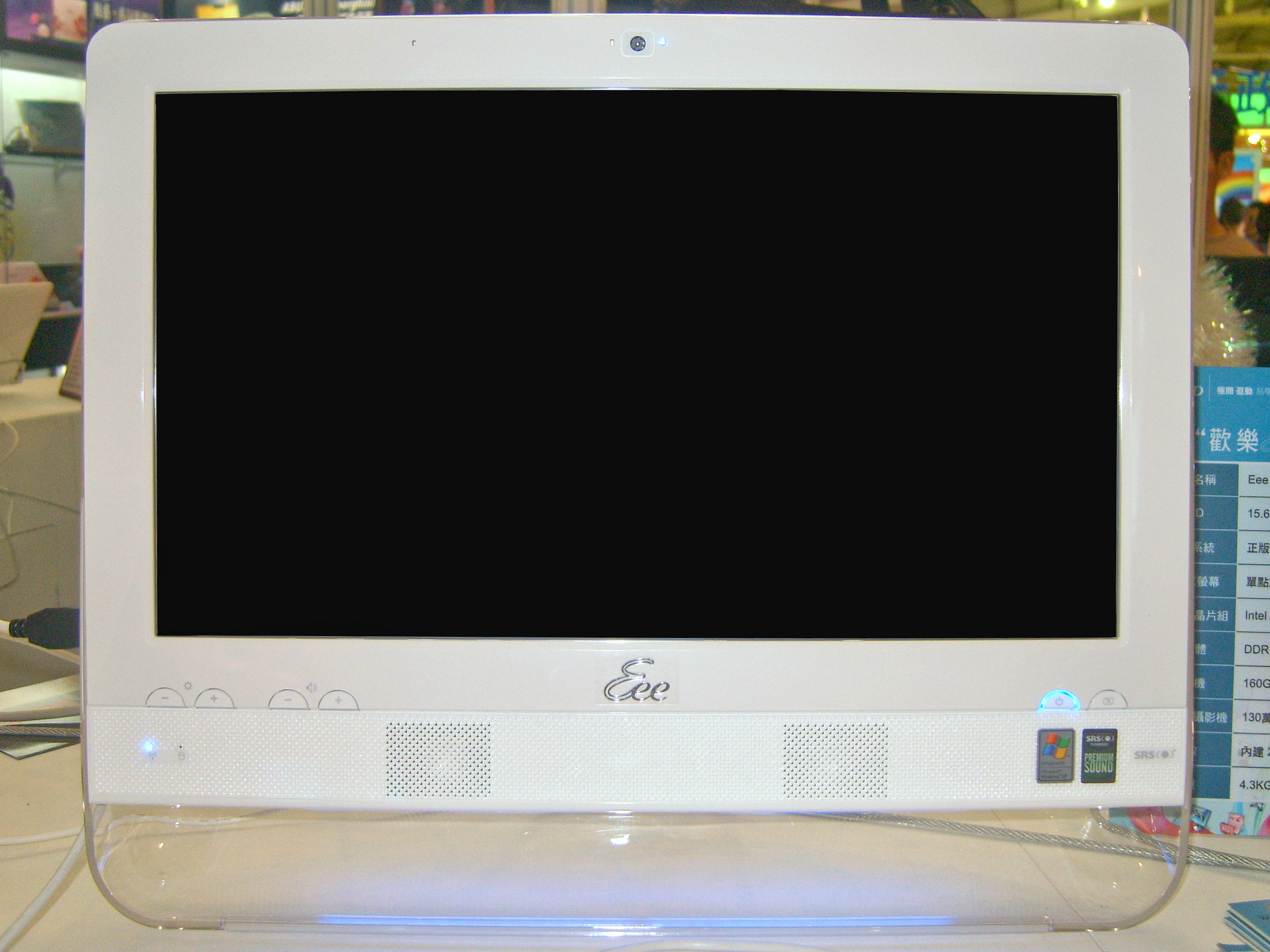
ASUS Eee Top

The Asus Eee Top is a touch screen computer designed by Asus and released in November 2008. Its motherboard employs Splashtop technology (an embedded Linux distribution) called "ExpressGate" by Asus. Both models feature a 1.6 GHz Atom processor, widescreen (16:9) 15.6" display, 1 GB RAM, 160GB HDD, 802.11n Wi-Fi, speakers, SD card reader and a 1.3 MP webcam with Windows XP Home modified with Asus' big-icon Easy Mode.

== Eee Keyboard ==
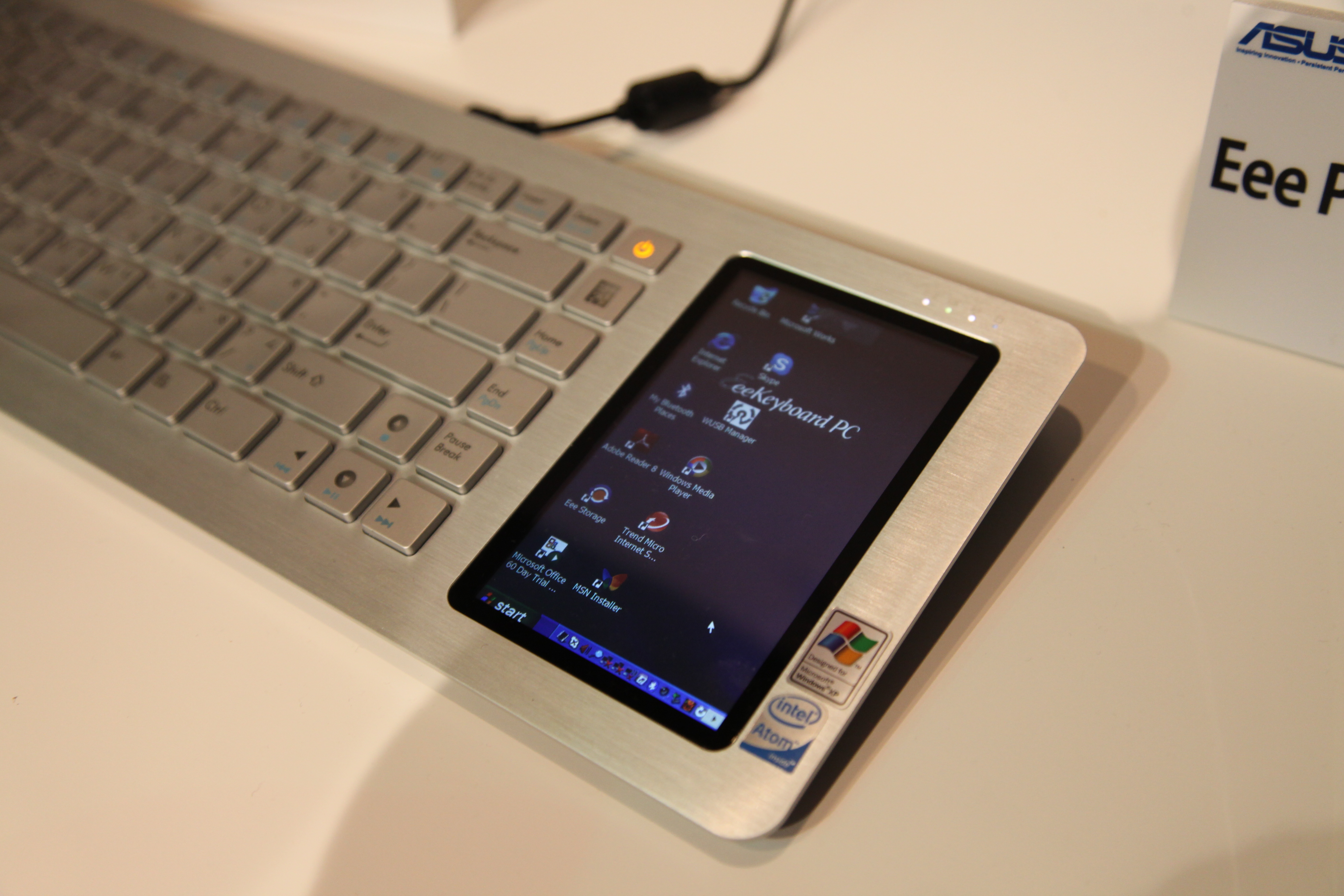
ASUS Eee Keyboard PC

ASUS Eee Keyboard pc contains a built-in PC motherboard within a full-size keyboard, similar to Cybernet's keyboard computer models and reminiscent of such 1980s PCs as the ZX Spectrum, Commodore 64, and Atari ST. It substituted a touchscreen in place of the conventional numeric keypad. ASUS had planned to ship the device in September 2009, but it actually debuted at CES 2010 and launched in March 2010.

The ASUS Eee Keyboard EK1542 contained a standard set of features typical for 2008 netbooks: an Intel Atom N270 processor (2.5W TDP), built around the Intel 945GSE chipset (6W TDP) and a ICH7-M South bridge (3.3W TDP). A Mobile Intel 945GSE Express chipset integrated into the Intel GMA 950 video subsystem resulted in performance similar to the Asus EEE PCs 901/1000.

The computer came with Windows XP Home Edition; an additional 1 GB RAM, as well as a 16 or 32 GB Solid State Drive, was soldered directly to the motherboard (preventing any memory upgrade). Network interfaces consisted of a standard gigabit LAN adapter, Wi-Fi 802.11b/g/n @2.4 GHz, and Bluetooth. A Realtek sound system drove 2 small built-in speakers, and a Li-Po accumulator provided a power capacity of 49 W*h.

It boasted some unique features: a 5-inch, 800×480 screen with a multi-touch panel, a Broadcom video decoder for accelerating H.264 and VC-1 high-definition compression algorithms, and a Wireless 720p Video Transmitting function utilizing Ultra-wideband Technology (a minicard receiver connecting to a TV/monitor via HDMI).

== Eee Stick ==
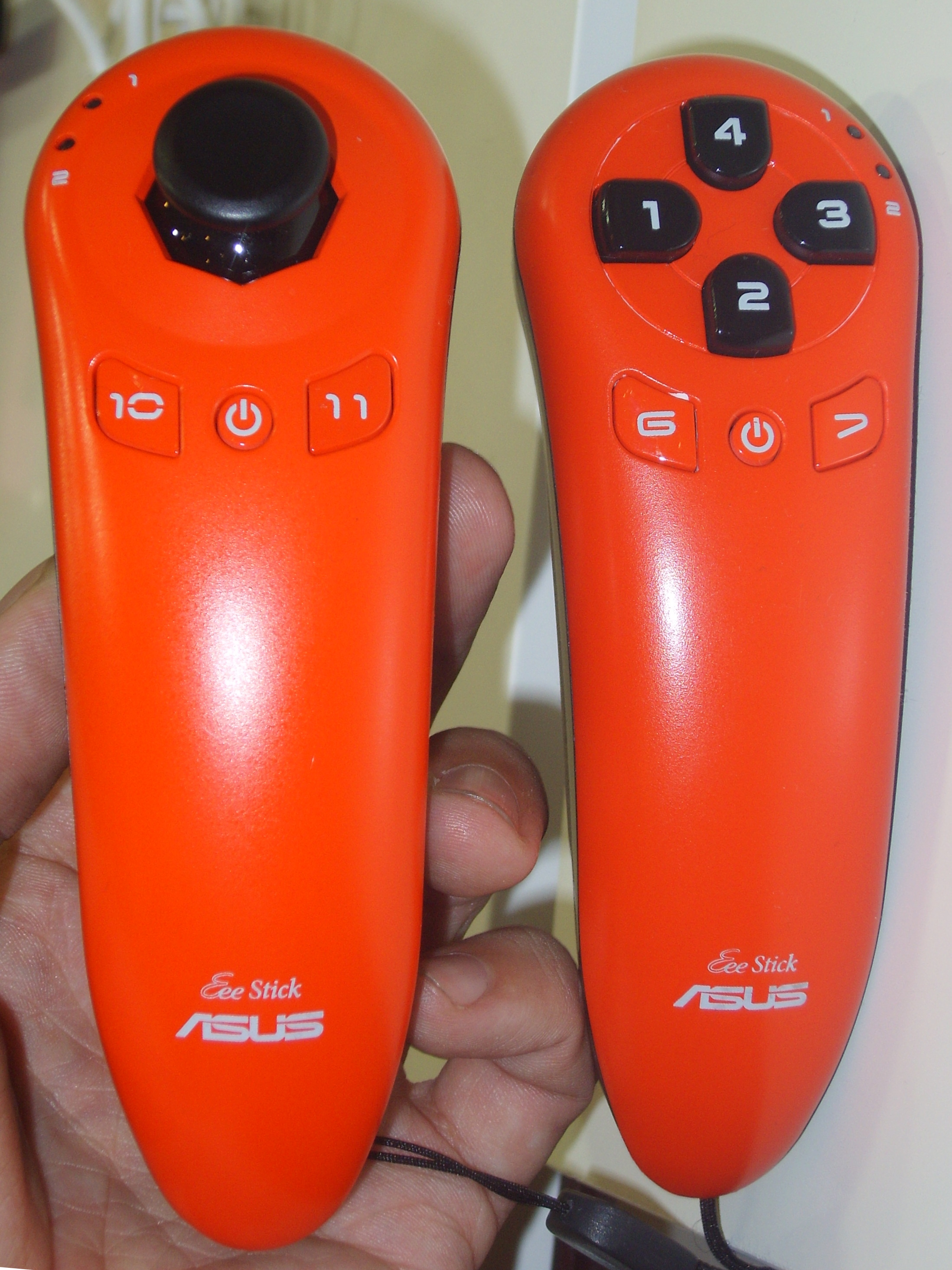
Asus Eee Stick in red

The Eee Stick is an accessory that is bundled with specific models of the Eee PC and EeeBox PC. These specific models come with games that take advantage of the features of this hardware. This accessory is very similar to the Wii Nunchuck. The Eee Stick takes two AA batteries in each of the two components (four batteries in total).

== Eee PC Media Server ==
Asus Eee PC Media Server was shown at CES 2009.

== Eee Pad MeMO ==
Asus MeMO 171 tablet was displayed at CES 2011, while MeMO 370T was displayed at CES 2012

- Eee Pad MeMO 171 - 1280x800 pixel 7" screen, powered by Qualcomm 8260 Dual-core CPU 1.2 GHz, and Android 3.2 Honeycomb; for US$600, available only in Asia.
- Eee Pad MeMO 370T - 1280x800 pixel 7" screen, powered by the 4-core Tegra 3, and Android 4.1 Jelly Bean; 16GB for US$249 (pre-tax).

== Eee Slate ==
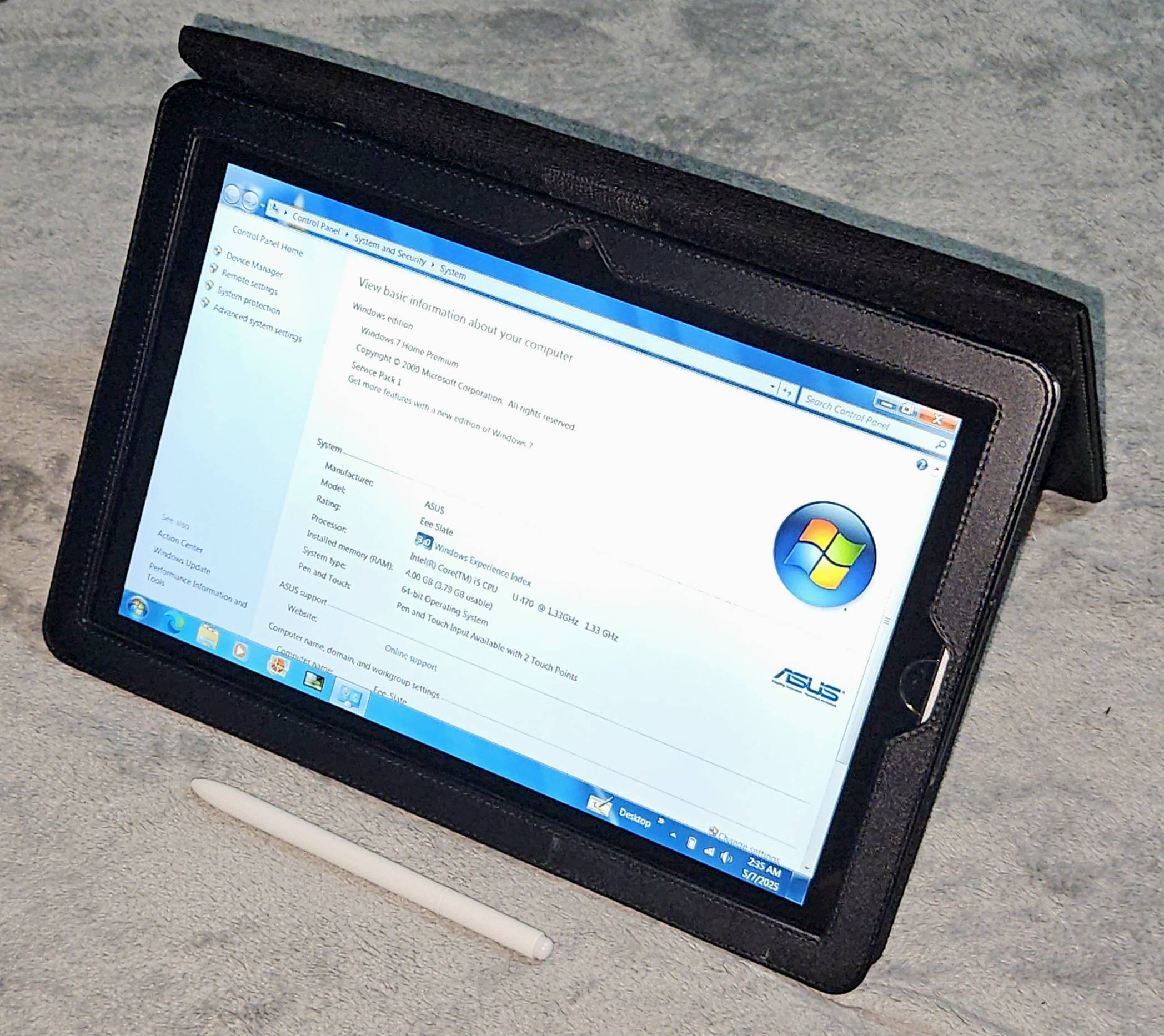
Asus Eee Slate (EP121) inside the original folio case alongside the stylus

The Asus Eee Slate is a 64-bit tablet with a 12.1" screen, 2.0-megapixel front-facing camera, SSD storage, and an Intel Core i5-470UM processor. It came with a folio case and a rebranded Microsoft Bluetooth Mobile Keyboard 5000. The Eee Slate made its debut at CES in 2011 and was notable for being quite powerful for a consumer tablet.

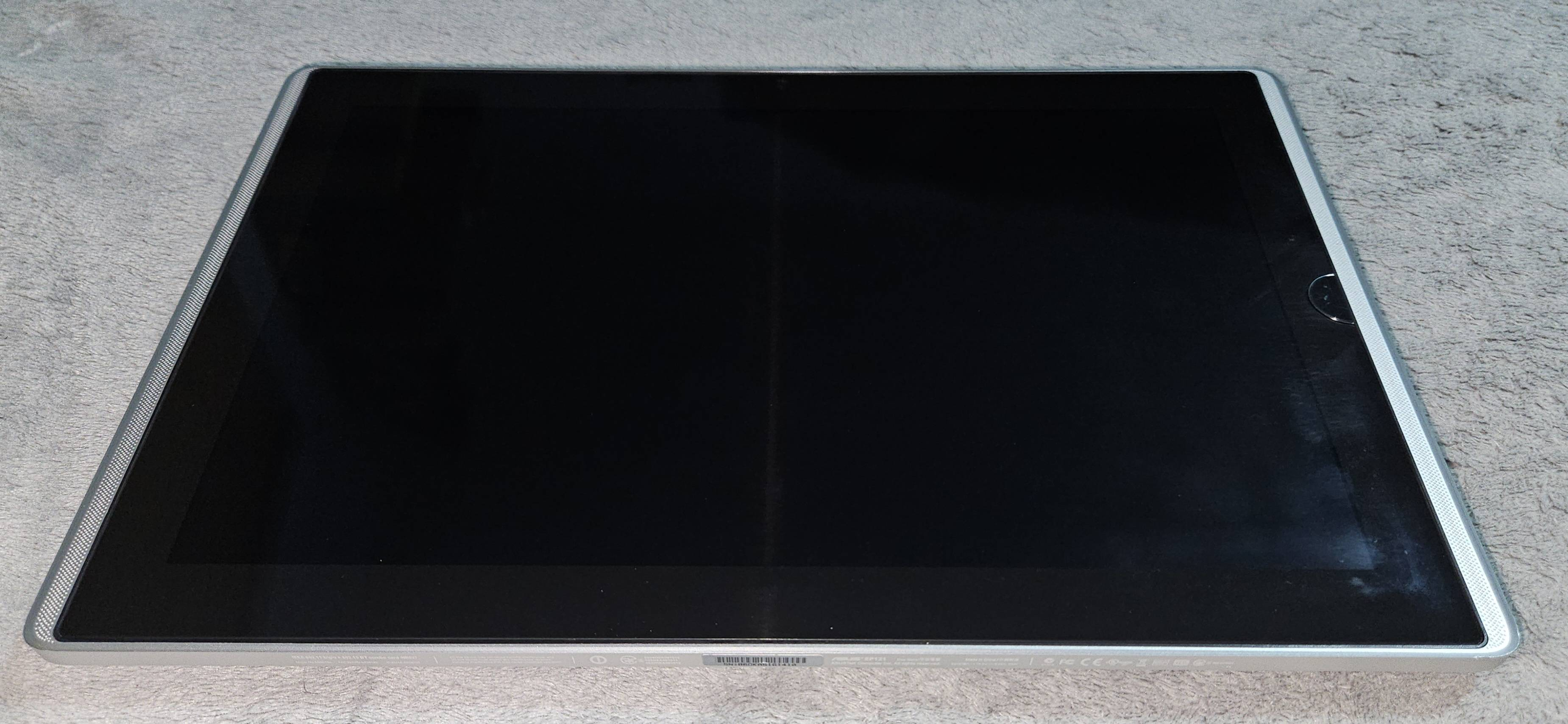
Front of the Asus Eee Slate (EP121)

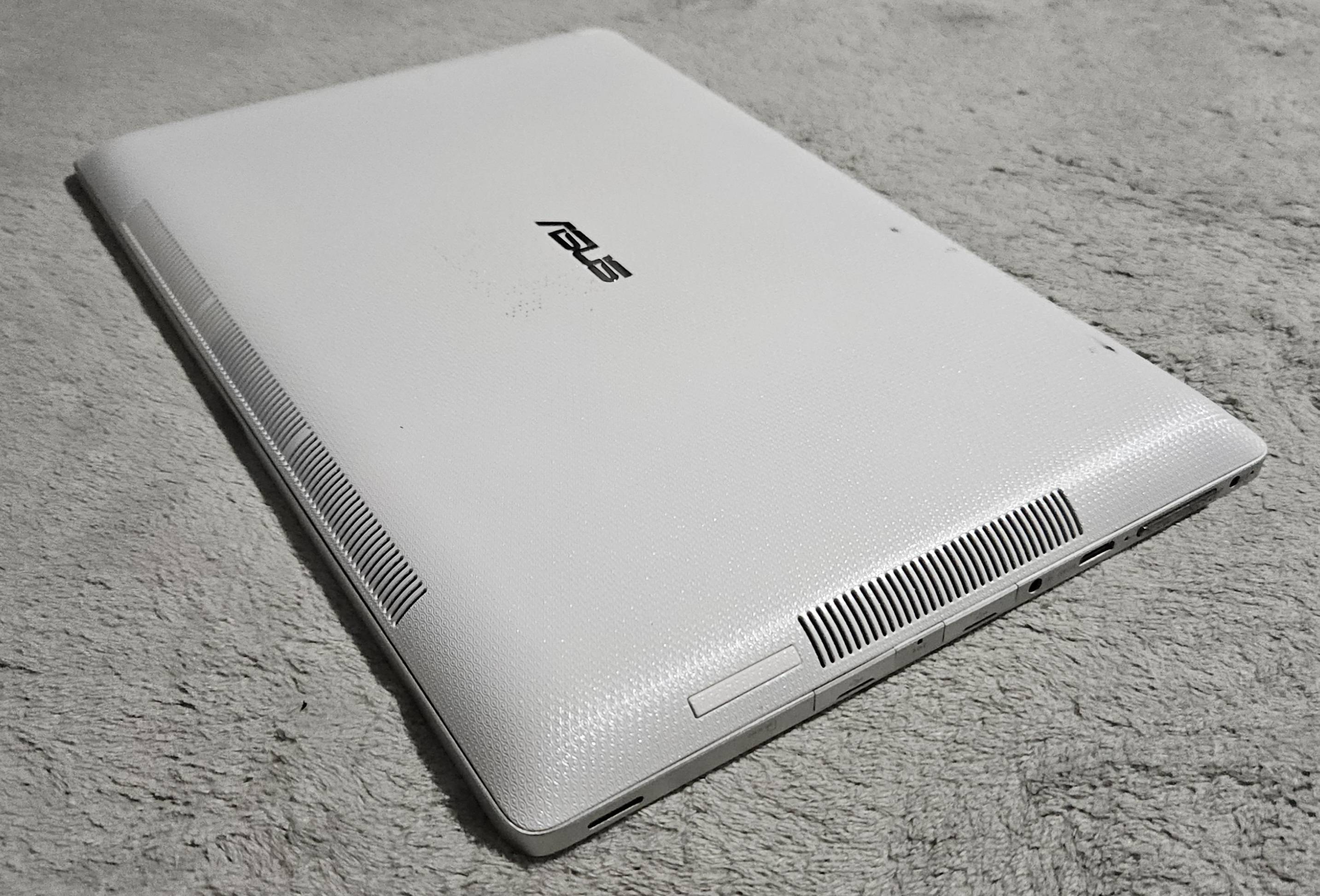
Back of the Asus Eee Slate (EP121) from an angle, showing the ports on the left side

This device has a built-in stylus that can be accessed by opening the spring-loaded compartment on the top right side. The top left has two switches: one for power and the other for toggling the rotation lock. It also has a button that brings up an on-screen keyboard. The very left side of the tablet has volume controls, two USB Type-A ports, an SD card slot, a charging port, a headphone jack, and a Mini-HDMI port. The upper front features the camera, and the right side has a button for switching between open programs. In terms of wireless connectivity, it has Atheros Wi-Fi 802.11b/g/n and Bluetooth 3.0.

The consumer model, EP121, comes with Windows 7 Home Premium pre-installed and has two variants: a 2GB RAM/32GB storage version and the other with 4GB RAM/64GB storage. The business-oriented model, B121, is nearly identical to the 64GB variant of the EP121 model but includes Windows 7 Professional instead of Home Premium. The Eee Slate also has official driver support for Windows 8 64-bit.

== Eee Pad and Eee Reader ==
Asus showed previews of a dual-touchscreen "Flipbook" notebook at Cebit 2009 in Germany. The company stated that the Flipbook possessed the capability of optionally displaying user interface elements in both screens both horizontally and vertically; the concept design was renamed as the "Eee Reader", rebranded as an e-book reader, and scheduled for launch in Q4 2009, which did not happen as intended. Finally, the Eee Reader was rebranded again as the "Eee Book" and scheduled for launch at the June 2010 Computex Taipei.

In addition, Asus disclosed to the press in January 2010 that a tablet computer named as "Eee Pad", using an Nvidia Tegra 2 chip, a 3G wireless connection and a 720p or 1080p resolution, would also debut at Computex. It finally materialized in March 2011 as the Eee Pad Transformer (TF101) which has an optional real (hardware) keyboard that can be connected to it. This was then Succeeded by the Asus Eee Pad Transformer Prime in December 2011.

In 2012 the newest version was released, the Asus Transformer Pad Infinity.

== Eee Note ==
Originally released in Taiwan, featuring stand-alone note-taking/sketching capability and an E-reader. Its non-backlit screen had a long battery life, and incorporated a Wacom tablet with pressure sensitivity allowing pen-drawing on PC when connected with a micro-USB cable.

== EeeBook ==
The Asus EeeBook is a lineup of affordable Windows laptops by Asus. In 2014 Asus introduced EeeBook lineup of computers starting with the X205TA model. By 2017 the EeeBook lineup was succeeded by the Asus VivoBook E Series. Some EeeBook laptops were rebranded to VivoBook E Series laptops such as the EeeBook E202 was rebranded to the VivoBook E202 and the EeeBook E402 to the VivoBook E402. The EeeBook lineup consists of the E202 (E202SA), E402 (E402MA), E502 (E502SA and E502MA) and X205 (X205TA).
