= Lenovo IdeaPad S12 =

Netbook computer line by Lenovo

IdeaPad S12
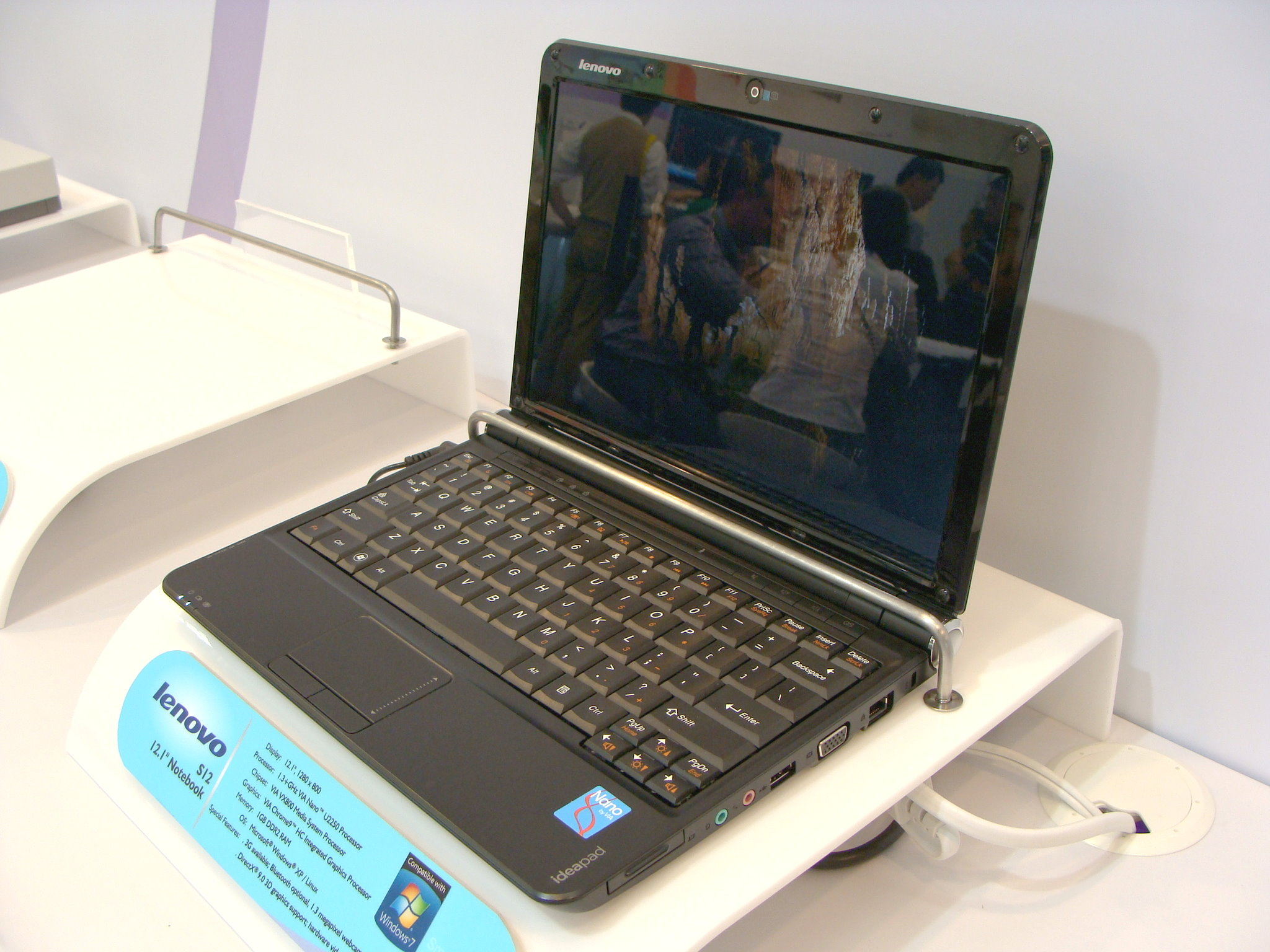
- Developer: Lenovo (2009–present)
- Type: Netbook
- Released: 2009
- Media: 160, 250 or 320 GB 2.5" 5,400 rpm SATA HDD at 1.5 Gb/s
- Operating system: Windows XP with Lenovo Quick Start or Windows 7 Home Premium 32-bit
- CPU: 1.6 GHz Intel Atom; 1.6 GHz Via Nano
- Memory: 2 GB of PC2-5300 667 (supports up to 3GB)
- Display: 12.1" 1280×800 WXGA LED-backlit TFT LCD
- Input: Keyboard; Touchpad; Microphone; 1.3 Megapixel Webcam
- Connectivity: 10/100 Mbit Ethernet; 802.11b/g wireless LAN; 3 USB 2.0 ports 4-in-1 Flash Memory card reader Bluetooth (Windows 7 versions only); Expresscard
- Power: 6-cell (5 hours)
- Dimensions: 11.50" × 9.10" × 0.90" — 1.40"
- Weight: 3.42 pounds (1.6 kg)

The IdeaPad S12 is a line of consumer-oriented netbook computers designed by Lenovo. It is a model in the IdeaPad series and their first netbook to have a 12" screen. The computers were put on the market in 2009 and currently come in black and white.

== Description ==
It contains either an Intel Atom N270 1.6 GHz processor or a Via Nano 1.3 GHz processor. They support 802.11 b/g wireless networking and come with three USB ports, an ExpressCard/34 expansion slot, a 4-in-1 media reader, VGA and HDMI outputs and an ethernet port. The S12 is one of the first netbooks to support nVidia's ION platform for mobile HD video playback.

=== Past revision ===
The IdeaPad S12 has a base price of (USD) $449 for the Intel Atom N270 model and (USD) $429 for the Via Nano ULV 2250. It features a 12.1" 1280×800 WXGA display with a 160GB hard disk drive, which can be upgraded by removing the keyboard and 1GB DDR2 SDRAM, which is easily upgraded via a user access panel on the bottom of the netbook.

=== Last lineup ===
The S12 was revised on 22 October 2009 and was priced between (USD) $399 and $649. It comes with either Windows XP Home Edition or Windows 7 Home Premium, a 160–320 GB hard drive, and 1–3 GB of RAM.
