= MSI Wind PC =

- Developer: Micro-Star International
- Type: Desktop, Nettop
- Operating system: Windows XP Home and SUSE Linux Enterprise Desktop 10
- CPU: 1.6 GHz Intel Atom 330
- Memory: 2 GB maximum; HDD 160 GB
- Display: VGA adaptor
- Graphics: Intel GMA 950
- Connectivity: 10/100/1000 Mbit Ethernet Bluetooth; 3 USB 2.0 ports Memory card reader VGA video output
- Power: External 19 VDC, 40 W Adaptor.

MSI Wind PC is a nettop counterpart to the MSI Wind Netbook. The MSI Wind PC is sold in Europe, Asia, and in the United States, barebones kits were available until Summer 2009, when desktop units also became available.

On January 15, 2009, MSI announced a new model of the Wind, the NetTop D130, with a dual-core processor.

There are 3 MSI wind PC models listed on the MSI website: Wind PC, Wind PC (Linux), and the Wind PC 100. In addition, there are 8 products using the "Nettop" name and 6 that use alphanumeric codes, i.e. 6676-003BUS or 6667BB-004US.

== See also ==
- Nettop
  - Acer Aspire Revolution
  - ASUS Eee Box
  - Dell Studio Hybrid
  - Mac Mini
