= Asus Memo Pad =

Asus Memo Pad may refer to:

- Asus Memo Pad 7
- Asus Memo Pad HD 7
- Asus Memo Pad 8
