= V70 =

V70 may refer to:

== Automobiles ==
- Haima V70, a MPV
- Jiabao V70, a microvan
- Maxus V70, a van
- Volvo V70, an executive car

== Other uses ==
- Asus v70, a mobile phone
- ITU-T V.70, a telecommunications standard
- NEC V70, a microprocessor
- ValPure V70, a chemical coating
- Vivo V70, a Vivo smartphone
