= Asus Memo Pad 7 =

2013 budget Android tablet by Asus

Asus Memo Pad ME172V
- Developer: Asus
- Manufacturer: Asus
- Type: Tablet computer
- Generation: 1st generation
- Released: January 2013
- Operating system: Android 4.1.1 (Jelly Bean)
- CPU: ARM Cortex-A9 1 GHz, VIA WM8950 chipset
- Memory: 1 GB RAM
- Storage: 8 or 16 GB
- Removable storage: microSD up to 32 GB
- Display: 7-inch (180 mm) diagonal IPS LCD capacitive touchscreen, 1024x600 pixels resolution, 170 ppi
- Graphics: ARM Mali-400
- Sound: MP3, WAV, eAAC+, WMA
- Input: Accelerometer, microphone
- Camera: 1 MP front facing camera
- Connectivity: 3.5 mm headphone jack, Wi-Fi (802.11 b/g/n @ 2.4 GHz), Micro USB 2.0
- Online services: Google Play
- Dimensions: 196.2 mm × 119.2 mm × 11.26 mm (7.72 in × 4.69 in × 0.44 in)
- Weight: 370 g (13 oz)
- Related: Kindle Fire, Nook Tablet
- Website: www.asus.com/Tablets_Mobile/ASUS_MeMO_Pad/#specifications

Asus Memo Pad ME172V is a low-end, budget Android tablet manufactured by Taiwanese corporation Asus. The tablet was announced and released in January 2013. At $149 (launch price) it was $50 cheaper than its competitors, the Google Nexus 7 and Amazon Kindle Fire HD, but critical design flaws led to poor ratings.

== Specifications ==
The device runs the operating system Android 4.1.1 (codename: Jelly Bean). Features of the tablet include a 7-inch IPS LCD, 1 GHz single-core ARM Cortex-A9 processor, 1 GB of RAM and 1 MP front-facing camera. The tablet has approximately a 7-hour battery life.

== Reception ==
- PC Magazine compared the Asus to the Amazon Kindle Fire as a "solid alternative" but would not recommend the tablet for more than surfing the web and reading books. Disappointing battery life also hurt the tablets ratings.
- CNET also rated the Asus poorly, citing system crashes while playing games, poor battery life and is uncomfortable to hold.
