= Asus Memo Pad HD 7 =

2013 Android tablet by Asus

ASUS MeMO Pad HD 7
- Developer: Asus
- Manufacturer: Asus
- Type: Tablet computer
- Released: July 2013
- Operating system: Android 4.2 (Jelly Bean)
- CPU: ARM Cortex-A7; 1.2 GHz, Mediatek MT8125 chipset
- Memory: 1 GB DRAM
- Storage: 8 GB or 16 GB
- Removable storage: microSD up to 32 GB
- Display: 7-inch (180 mm) diagonal IPS; LED capacitive touchscreen, 1280x800 pixels resolution, 216 ppi
- Graphics: PowerVR SGX544
- Sound: MP3, WAV, eAAC+, WMA
- Input: Accelerometer
- Camera: Rear: 2MP (8 GB model) or 5MP (16 GB model); Front: 0.3MP (8GB model) or 1.2MP (16 GB model)
- Connectivity: 3.5 mm headphone jack, Wi-Fi (802.11 b/g/n @ 2.4 GHz), Micro USB 2.0
- Dimensions: 196.85 mm × 120.65 mm × 10.92 mm (7.75 in × 4.75 in × 0.43 in)
- Weight: 302 g (10.7 oz)
- Related: Kindle Fire, Nook Tablet
- Website: Tablets Mobile

ASUS MeMO Pad HD 7 is a low-end low priced budget Android tablet manufactured by Taiwanese corporation Asus. The tablet was announced in June and released in July 2013. The device runs the operating system Android 4.2 (codename: Jelly Bean). The specifications include a 7-inch IPS LED display, 1.2 GHz quad-core ARM Cortex-A7 processor, 1 GB of RAM, a storage of 8 GB (whereof Android 4.2.2 occupies just short of 3.5 GB) or 16 GB, and 5 MP rear camera.

A successor with the model name Asus MeMO Pad 7 ME176 was announced on June 2, 2014, which had a new 64-bit Intel Atom Z3745 processor.
