= Haima 7X =

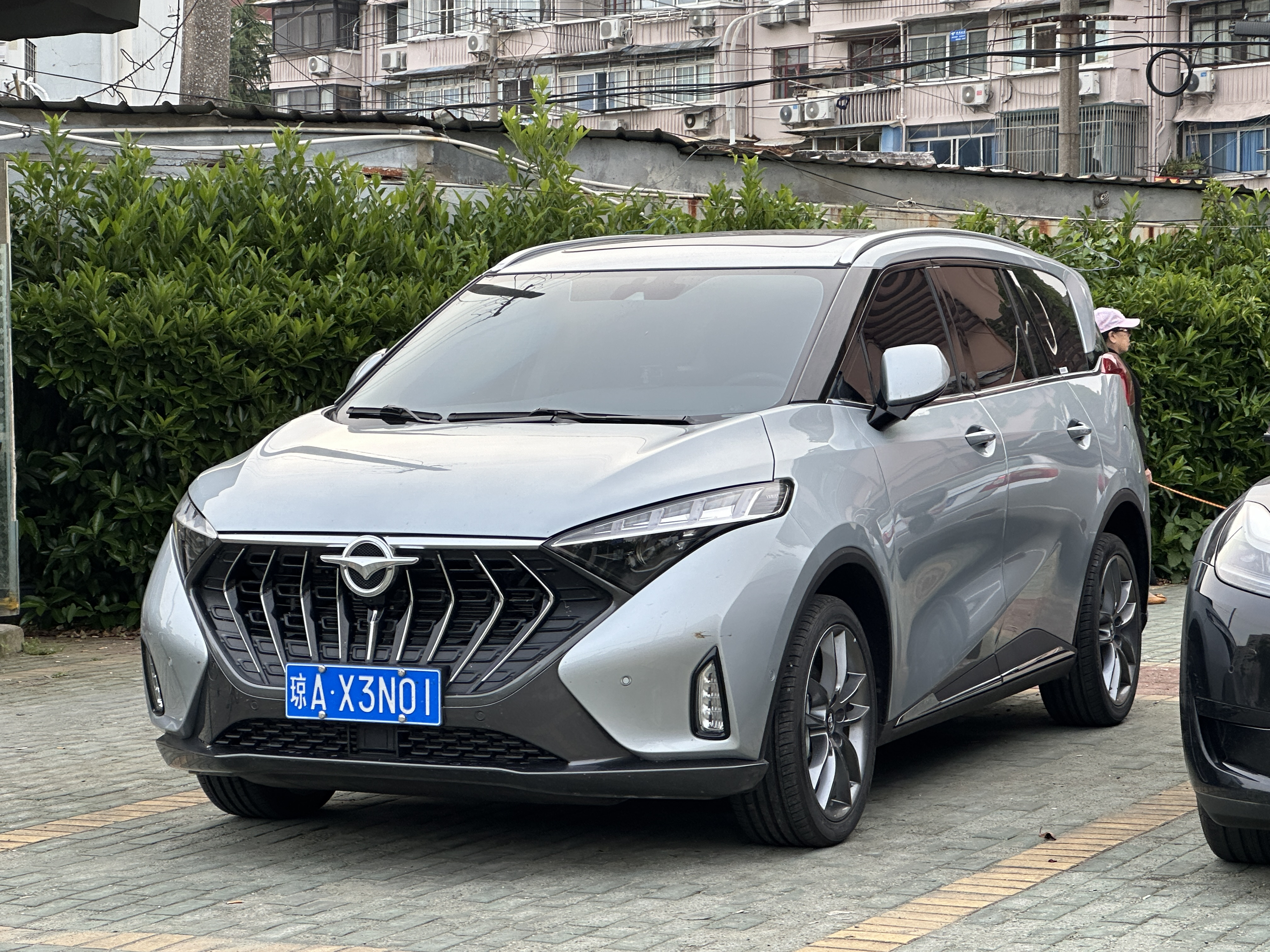

Overview
- Manufacturer: Haima Automobile
- Production: 2020–present
- Assembly: China: Hainan; Iran: Binalud (IKCO Khorasan)
- Designer: Yuan Wang at Pininfarina

Body and chassis
- Class: Minivan
- Body style: 5-door minivan

Powertrain
- Engine: 1.6 L turbo engine
- Transmission: 6-speed automatic transmission

Dimensions
- Wheelbase: 2,860 mm (112.6 in)
- Length: 4,815 mm (189.6 in)
- Width: 1,874 mm (73.8 in)
- Height: 1,720 mm (67.7 in)
- Curb weight: 1,670–2,195 kg (3,682–4,839 lb)

Chronology
- Predecessor: Haima F7

The Haima 7X is a minivan produced by Chinese automaker Haima Automobile since 2020.

== Overview ==
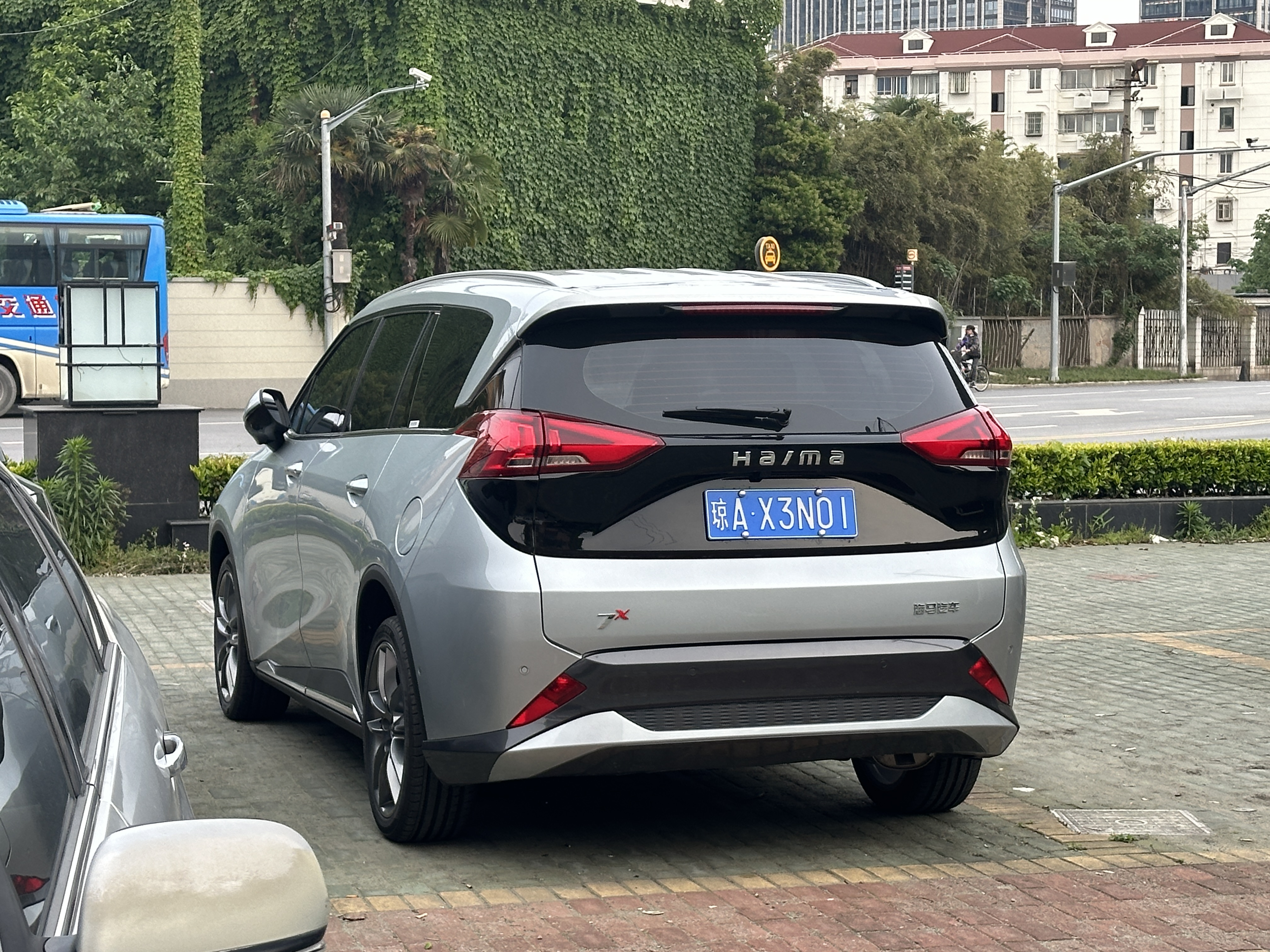
Rear view

The Haima 7X was revealed at Auto Guangzhou in November 2019 as a replacement to the Haima F7 and to help increase sales from the company. It was launched in August 2020 and has a price range of ¥130.000 to ¥150.000 ($18,780–$21,670).

The Haima 7X was showcased at the 2020 Auto Expo in Greater Noida, Uttar Pradesh, India in February, previewing possible future entry of the company and sale of the MPV in the country.

=== Design ===
According to Haima, the 7X was designed by Italian company Pininfarina and features a yacht-themed design inspired by Italian luxury yachts. The design of the Haima 7X is based on the 2018 Haima VF00 concept revealed at Auto China in Beijing in April 2018.

== Specifications ==
The Haima 7X is powered by 1.6-liter turbo engine with 190 horsepower and 293Nm of torque with a 6-speed automatic transmission. The 7X is based on the Haima Global Architecture platform (HMGA). The 7X has 7 seats and a 2+2+3 seat configuration.
