= GeForce Partner Program =

Marketing program

The Nvidia GeForce Partner Program was a marketing program designed to provide partnering companies with benefits such as public relations support, video game bundling, and marketing development funds. The program proved to be controversial, with complaints about it possibly being an anti-competitive practice. Nvidia canceled the program in May 2018.

== History ==
The GeForce Partner Program was first announced by Nvidia in a blog post on March 1, 2018. On March 8, 2018, technology website HardOCP released an article which stated that Kyle Bennett (author of the article and editor-in-chief of HardOCP) had interviewed several people and companies who all said that they thought the terms of the GeForce Partner Program were "likely illegal" and that the program would "tremendously hurt consumer choices". While a number of manufacturers joined the program (including Asus, MSI, and Gigabyte), it was reported that HP and Dell refused. It was reported that the US Federal Trade Commission and European Commission were investigating the program.

Nvidia canceled the GeForce Partner Program on May 4, 2018, while asserting that there were a number of "rumors, conjecture, and mistruths" being discussed about the program.

== Practices ==
The program was regarded as an anti-consumer practice due to the fact that partnering companies were required to remove their gaming branding from all non-Nvidia graphics cards, hurting consumer choice. Reportedly in response to these restrictions, manufacturers began releasing new brands for AMD's competing Radeon products.
