= AAEON =

Taiwanese manufacturing company

AAEON Technology Inc.
- Company type: Public
- Traded as: TWSE: 6579
- ISIN: TW0006579006
- Industry: Computer hardware
- Founded: 1992; 34 years ago
- Headquarters: Taipei, Taiwan
- Key people: Chuang Y. S. (chairman); Lee I. J. (vice-chairman); Howard Lin (CEO)
- Products: Automation controllers & software, Industrial PCs, embedded single-board computers, embedded controllers, Rugged tablet PCs, network appliance, panel PCs
- Revenue: ▲US$ 170M (2016)
- Number of employees: 700+ (2017)
- Parent: ASUS
- Website: www.aaeon.com

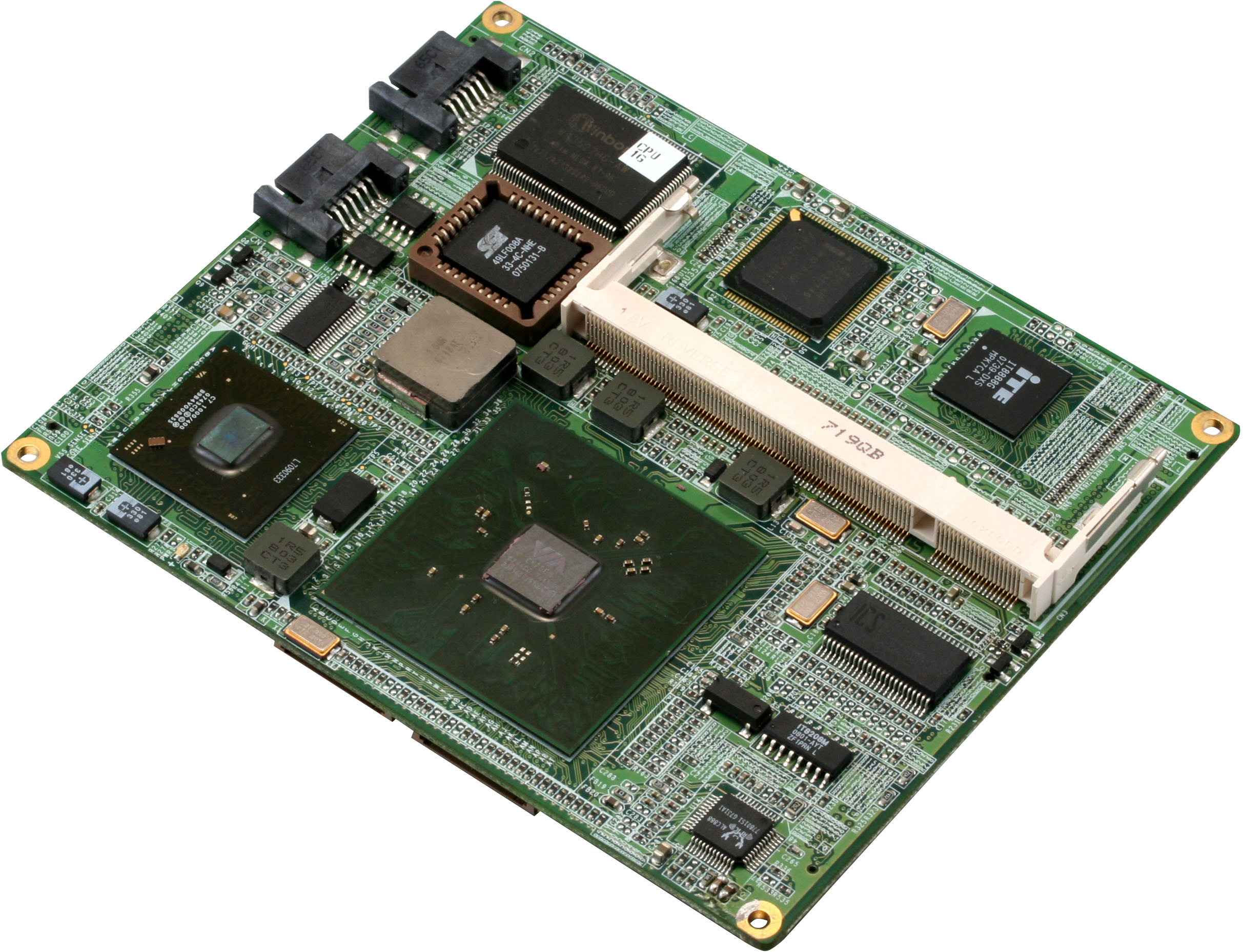
ETX modul CX700M from Aaeon

AAEON Technology Inc. is a Taiwanese manufacturer of industrial computer and embedding systems. It was founded in 1992 in Taiwan. By 1998, it had more than 100 workers and became one of Taiwan's 1,000 largest manufacturers.

AAEON manufactures and markets OEM/ODM industrial PCs worldwide. Its product lines include embedded boards and computer-on-module, applied computing and network appliances, All-in-One HMI systems and displays, digital signage and self-service kiosk as well as cloud computing. Its production plants are in Taipei, Taiwan and Suzhou, China.

In 2000, AAEON acquired Astech Technology, Inc as part of its Panel PC Division. AAEON became a public limited company on the Taiwan Stock Exchange in 2001 under TAIEX: 6579, and in 2011 joined the ASUS group.
