= Haima F7 =

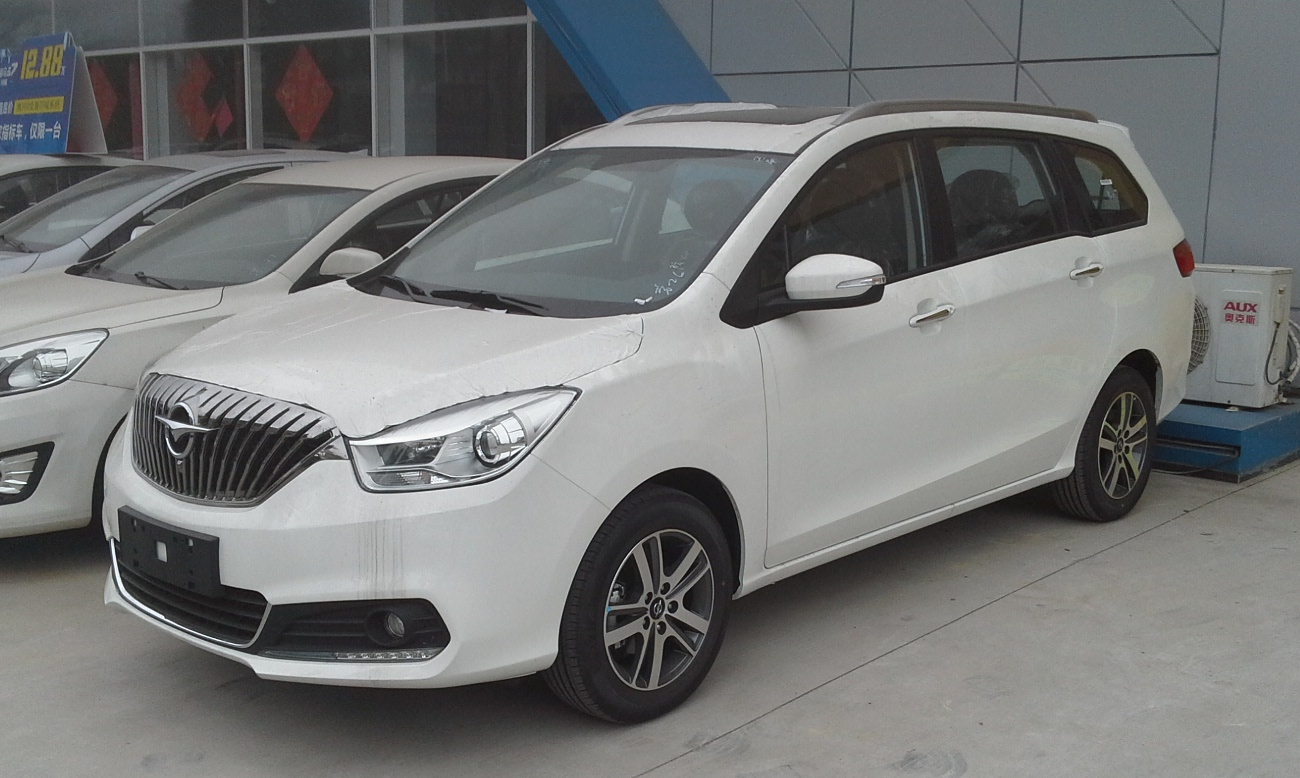

Overview
- Manufacturer: Haima Automobile
- Also called: Haima V70; Haima Family F7
- Production: 2016–2018 (China); 2016–2021 (Philippines)
- Assembly: China: Hainan

Body and chassis
- Class: Compact MPV
- Body style: 5-door minivan

Powertrain
- Engine: 1.5 L turbo I4 (petrol); 2.0 L I4 (petrol)
- Transmission: 6 speed manual; 6 speed automatic

Dimensions
- Wheelbase: 2,800 mm (110.2 in)
- Length: 4,750 mm (187.0 in)
- Width: 1,800 mm (70.9 in)
- Height: 1,695 mm (66.7 in)
- Curb weight: 1,600 kg (3,527 lb)

Chronology
- Predecessor: Haima Freema
- Successor: Haima 7X

The Haima F7 or Haima Family F7 (Chinese: 福美来F7) is a compact MPV that is manufactured by the Chinese manufacturer Haima.

== Overview ==
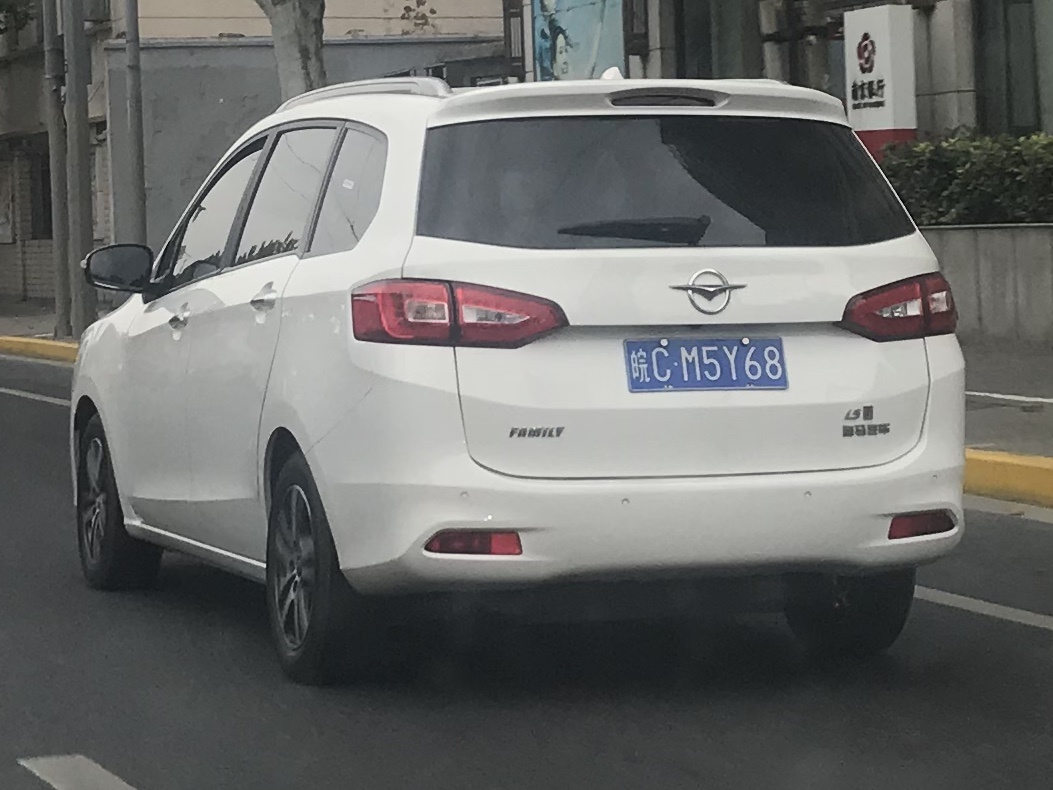
Rear view

Originally code named the Haima VB100 during development, it debuted at the 2016 Beijing Auto Show as the Haima V70 with prices starting at 79,800 yuan and ending at 129,800 yuan. The Haima F7 is powered by a 2.0-litre engine developing 152hp and 185nm, and a 1.5-litre turbo engine with 156hp and 220nm. Transmission options include a six-speed manual transmission or six-speed automatic transmission. The name was then changed to Haima Family F7 in 2017 to sit under the Family product series.
