= Asus v70 =

Cellular phone from Asustek

ASUS V70
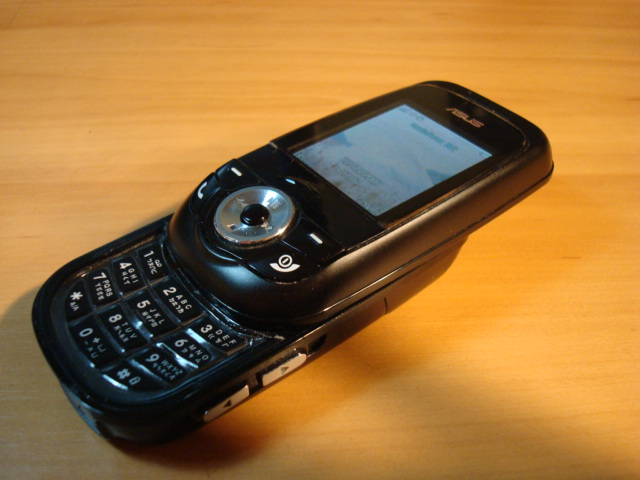
- Compatible networks: GSM 900/1800/1900 (tri band) with EDGE / GPRS
- Dimensions: 90×45×24 mm (3.54×1.77×0.94 in)
- Weight: 85 g (3 oz)
- Memory: 64 MB internal, miniSD external memory card slot
- Display: 176 x 220 1.8" 262K-color
- Connectivity: USB, Bluetooth (audio device only)

The ASUS V70 is a cellular phone from Asustek that was released in late 2005. The V70 was ASUSTek's first sliding phone, in the style of competing Samsung and LG phones, where the numeric keys are hidden beneath the screen of the phone when closed.

== Design and appearance ==
The V70 uses a slider form factor, where the user can push on a plastic bar located under the screen in order to open the sliding top portion of the phone. When opened, the top portion slides upwards, revealing the standard bell keypad (including numeric, star, and pound keys). These keys are covered when the phone is closed, but the remaining keys, including the side keys, can be used normally once the keypad is unlocked; such keys are automatically locked after the device is closed to prevent accidental activation when in a purse or pocket.

The V70 is available in black and white.

== Technical specifications ==
- Caller ID
- Photo Caller ID
- Video: Playback, Capture
- Bands: GSM 900/1800/1900
- Music Player: MP3 files
- Calculator and Currency Converter: Yes
- Calendar: Yes
- Talk Time: Up to 5 hours
- Standby Time: Up to 300 hours
- Dimensions (H x W x D): 90 x 45 x 24mm
- Volume: 97 cubic centimetres
- Camera: 1.3 MP camera
- Removable Memory: MiniSD
- Speakerphone: Yes
- Weight: 85 g

== Availability ==
The ASUS V70 was, as of 2015, only available in Taiwan.
