= Asus =

Taiwanese computer and electronics company

ASUSTeK Computer Inc.
- Logo used since 1995

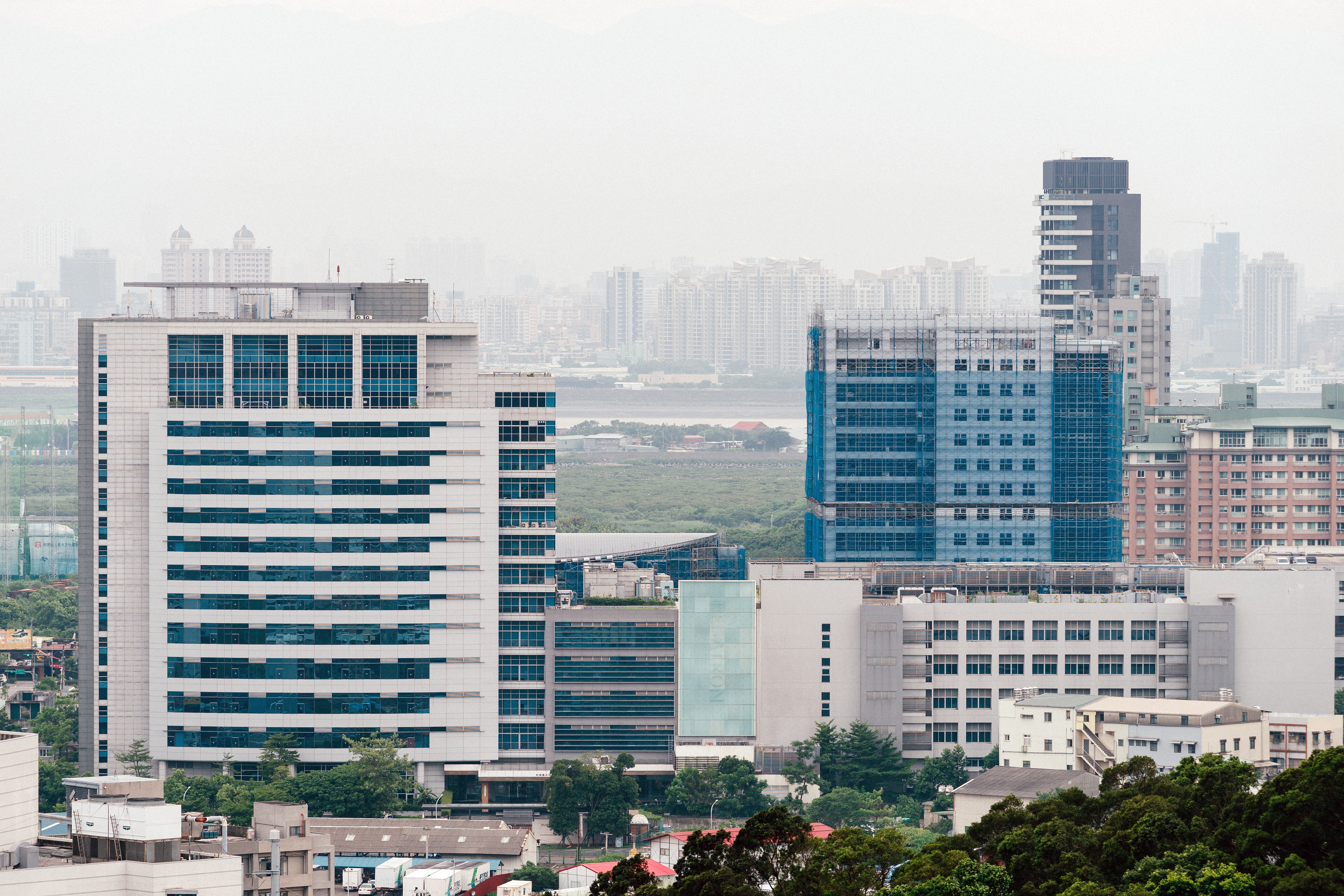
- Headquarters in Taipei in 2015
- Native name: 華碩電腦股份有限公司
- Romanized name: Huáshuò Diànnǎo Gǔfèn Yǒuxiàn Gōngsī
- Type: Public
- Traded as: TWSE: 2357
- Industry: Computer hardware Electronics; Networking hardware
- Founded: 2 April 1989; 37 years ago
- Founders: Ted Hsu; M. T. Liao; Wayne Tsiah; T. H. Tung; Luca D. M.
- Headquarters: Beitou District, Taipei, Taiwan
- Area served: Worldwide
- Key people: Jonney Shih (chairman & chief brand officer); Jonathan Tsang (vice-chairman)
- Products: Personal computers; monitors; projectors; motherboards; graphics cards; optical storage; peripherals; wearables; servers; workstations
- Brands: ROG; TUF Gaming
- Revenue: ▲NT$688.94 billion (2025) (US$22.1 billion)
- Operating income: ▲NT$33.94 billion (2025) (US$1.09 billion)
- Net income: ▲NT$44.56 billion (2025) (US$1.43 billion)
- Total assets: ▲NT$574.92 billion (2025) (US$18.45 billion)
- Total equity: ▲NT$265.4 billion (2025) (US$8.52 billion)
- Number of employees: 17,000+ (2025)
- Subsidiaries: AAEON; ASKEY; ASMedia; Asustor
- Website: www.asus.com

Asus
- Traditional Chinese: 華碩電腦股份有限公司
- Literal meaning: ASUS Computer Stock-share Limited Company
Transcriptions
Standard Mandarin
- Hanyu Pinyin: Huáshuò Diànnaǒ Gǔfèn Yǒuxiàn Gōngsī
- Tongyong Pinyin: Huashuo Diannao Gufen Yousiang Gongsih
Hakka
- Romanization: Fà sa̍k thien-nó kú fun yû han kûng-sṳ̂
Southern Min
- Hokkien POJ: Hôa se̍k tiān-náu kó͘ hūn ū hān kong si
- Tâi-lô: Hôa se̍k tiān-náu kó͘ hūn ū hān kong si

ASUS
- Traditional Chinese: 華碩
- Literal meaning: "Chinese-Eminent"; Eminence of/by the Chinese people (華人之碩)
Transcriptions
Standard Mandarin
- Hanyu Pinyin: Huáshuò
Hakka
- Romanization: Fà sa̍k
Southern Min
- Hokkien POJ: Hôa se̍k
- Tâi-lô: Hôa se̍k

Asustek Computer Inc. (/ˈeɪsuːs/, /eɪˈsuːs/, /ɑːˈ-/, /əˈ-/), doing business as Asus (stylized as ASUS), is a Taiwanese multinational computer, phone hardware and electronics manufacturer headquartered in Beitou District, Taipei, Taiwan. Its products include desktop computers, laptops, netbooks, mobile phones, networking equipment, monitors, Wi-Fi routers, projectors, motherboards, graphics cards, optical storage, multimedia products, peripherals, wearables, servers, workstations and tablet PCs. The company is also an original equipment manufacturer (OEM).

As of 2024, Asus is the world's fifth-largest personal computer vendor by unit sales. Asus has a primary listing on the Taiwan Stock Exchange under the ticker code 2357 and formerly had a secondary listing on the London Stock Exchange under the ticker code ASKD.

== Etymology ==
The company is usually referred to as ASUS or Huáshuò in Chinese (Chinese: 華碩, literally "Eminence" in Chinese). According to the company website, the name ASUS originates from Pegasus, the winged horse of Greek mythology. Only the last four letters of the word were used to give the name a high position in alphabetical listings. As its marketing taglines, Asus has used Rock Solid. Heart Touching (2003–2009) and subsequently Inspiring Innovation Persistent Perfection (2009–2013). Since 2013, the company's tagline has been In Search of Incredible.

== History ==
Asus was founded in Taipei in 1989 by Tzu-Hsien Tung, Ted Hsu, Wayne Hsieh and M.T. Liao, all four having previously worked at Acer as hardware engineers. At this time, Taiwan had yet to establish a leading position in the computer hardware business. Intel Corporation would supply any new processors to more established companies like IBM first, and Taiwanese companies would have to wait for approximately six months after IBM received its engineering prototypes. According to company history, Asus created a motherboard prototype for using an Intel 486, but it had to do so without access to the actual processor. When Asus approached Intel to request a processor to test it, Intel itself had a problem with its own 486 motherboard. Asus solved Intel's problem and it turned out that Asus's motherboard worked correctly without the need for further modification. Since then, Asus has been receiving Intel engineering samples ahead of its competitors.

In September 2005, Asus released the first PhysX accelerator card. In December 2005, Asus entered the LCD TV market with the TLW32001 model. In January 2006, Asus announced that it would cooperate with Lamborghini to develop the VX laptop series.

On 9 March 2006, Asus was confirmed as one of the manufacturers of the first Microsoft Origami models, together with Samsung and Founder Technology. On 8 August 2006, Asus announced a joint venture with Gigabyte Technology. On 5 June 2007, Asus announced the launch of the Eee PC netbook computer line at the Computex trade fair. On 9 September 2007, Asus indicated support for Blu-ray, announcing the release of a BD-ROM/DVD writer PC drive, BC-1205PT. Asus subsequently released several Blu-ray based notebooks.

In January 2008, Asus began a major restructuring of its operations, splitting into three independent companies: Asus (focused on applied first-party branded computers and electronics); Pegatron (focused on OEM manufacturing of motherboards and components); and Unihan Corporation (focused on non-PC manufacturing such as cases and molding). In the process of the restructuring, a highly criticized pension-plan restructuring effectively zeroed out the existing pension balances. The company paid out all contributions previously made by employees.

On 9 December 2008, the Open Handset Alliance announced that Asus had become one of 14 new members of the organization. These "new members will either deploy compatible Android devices, contribute significant code to the Android Open-Source Project, or support the ecosystem through products and services that will accelerate the availability of Android-based devices."

On 1 June 2010, Asus spun off Pegatron.

In October 2010, Asus and Garmin announced that they would be ending their smartphone partnership as a result of Garmin deciding to exit the product category. The two companies had produced six Garmin-Asus branded smartphones over the previous two years.

In December 2010, Asus launched the world's thinnest notebook, the Asus U36, with Intel processor voltage standard (not low voltage) Intel Core i3 or i5 with a thickness of only 19 mm.

In January 2013, Asus officially ended production of its Eee PC series due to declining sales caused by consumers increasingly switching to tablets and Ultrabooks.

In January 2014, ASUS officially launched the ZenFone smartphone line (ZenFone 4/5/6) at CES.

In September 2014, the company introduced the ZenWatch smartwatch on Android Wear.

In May 2016, the ZenFone 3 (ZenFone 3 / Deluxe / Ultra) was announced.

In June 2018, ASUS launched the ROG Phone, forming the “mobile gaming” direction and the Republic of Gamers ecosystem outside of PCs.

In December 2018, CEO Jerry Shen announced his departure.

In April 2022, the company unveiled its new logo.

In February 2025, ASUS announced a plan to purchase a 30 percent stake in industrial PC maker Portwell. Prior to the purchase, Portwell was a wholly owned subsidiary of Posiflex Technology Inc.

In April 2025, Nokia sued ASUS, Acer, and Hisense for infringing on video streaming technologies in the U.S.

In January 2026, Asus stated that Asus will exit the smartphone business in the same year, including ZenFone and ROG Phone business.

In June 2026, Asus unveiled Zenni Claw, an AI assistant for Windows 11 devices, at Computex 2026. They described it as a system that directs tasks between local and cloud processing. It is expected to be available on Asus devices that use Intel, AMD, and Qualcomm. Zenni Claw became available as a free beta download in July 2026.

== Corporate affairs ==
The key trends for Asus are (as of the financial year ending 31 December):

Year	Revenue (TWD bn)	Net profit (TWD bn)
2019	351	14.3
2020	412	23.9
2021	535	44.5
2022	537	14.6
2023	482	15.9

== Operations ==
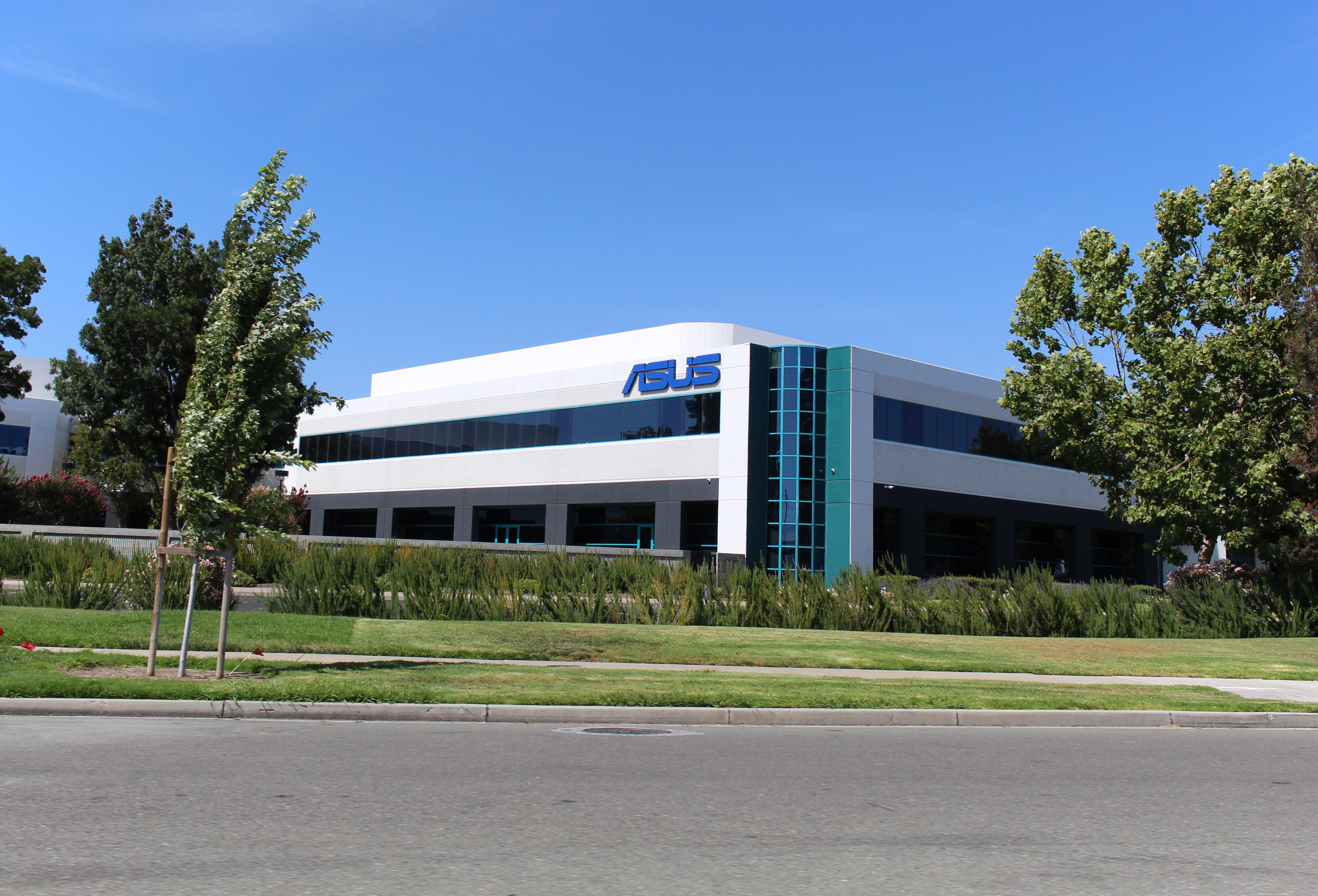
Asus US headquarters in Fremont, California

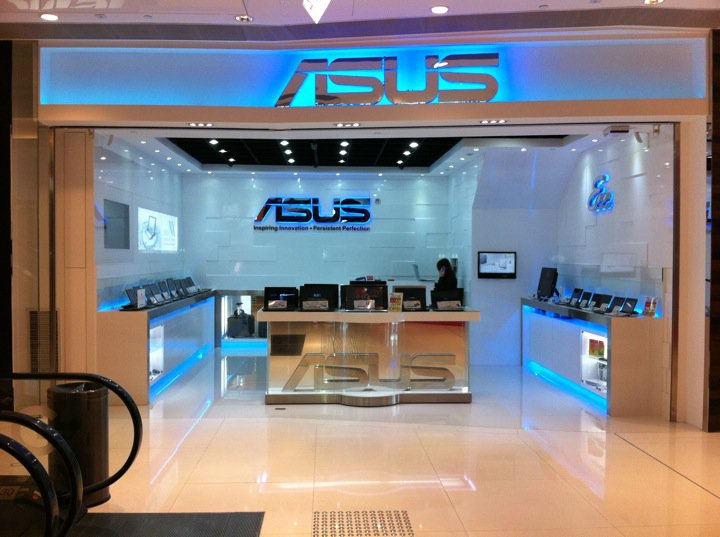
An Asus shop in Hong Kong

Asus has its headquarters in Beitou District, Taipei, Taiwan.

As of 2009, Asus had manufacturing facilities in Taiwan (Taipei, Luzhu, Nangang, Guishan), China (Suzhou, Chongqing), Mexico (Ciudad Juárez) and the Czech Republic (Ostrava). The Asus Hi-Tech Park, located in Suzhou, covers 540,000 m^{2} (5,800,000 sq ft).

== Products ==
Asus's products include 2-in-1s, laptops, tablet computers, desktop computers, smartphones, personal digital assistants (PDAs), servers, computer monitors, motherboards, graphics cards, sound cards, DVD drives, computer networking devices, computer cases, computer components and computer cooling systems.

One of Asus main lineups is the Vivo lineup consisting of laptops (VivoBooks), All-in-Ones (Vivo AiO), desktops (VivoPC), Stick PCs (VivoStick), Mini PCs (VivoMini), smartwatches (VivoWatch), computer mouse (VivoMouse) and tablets (VivoTab).

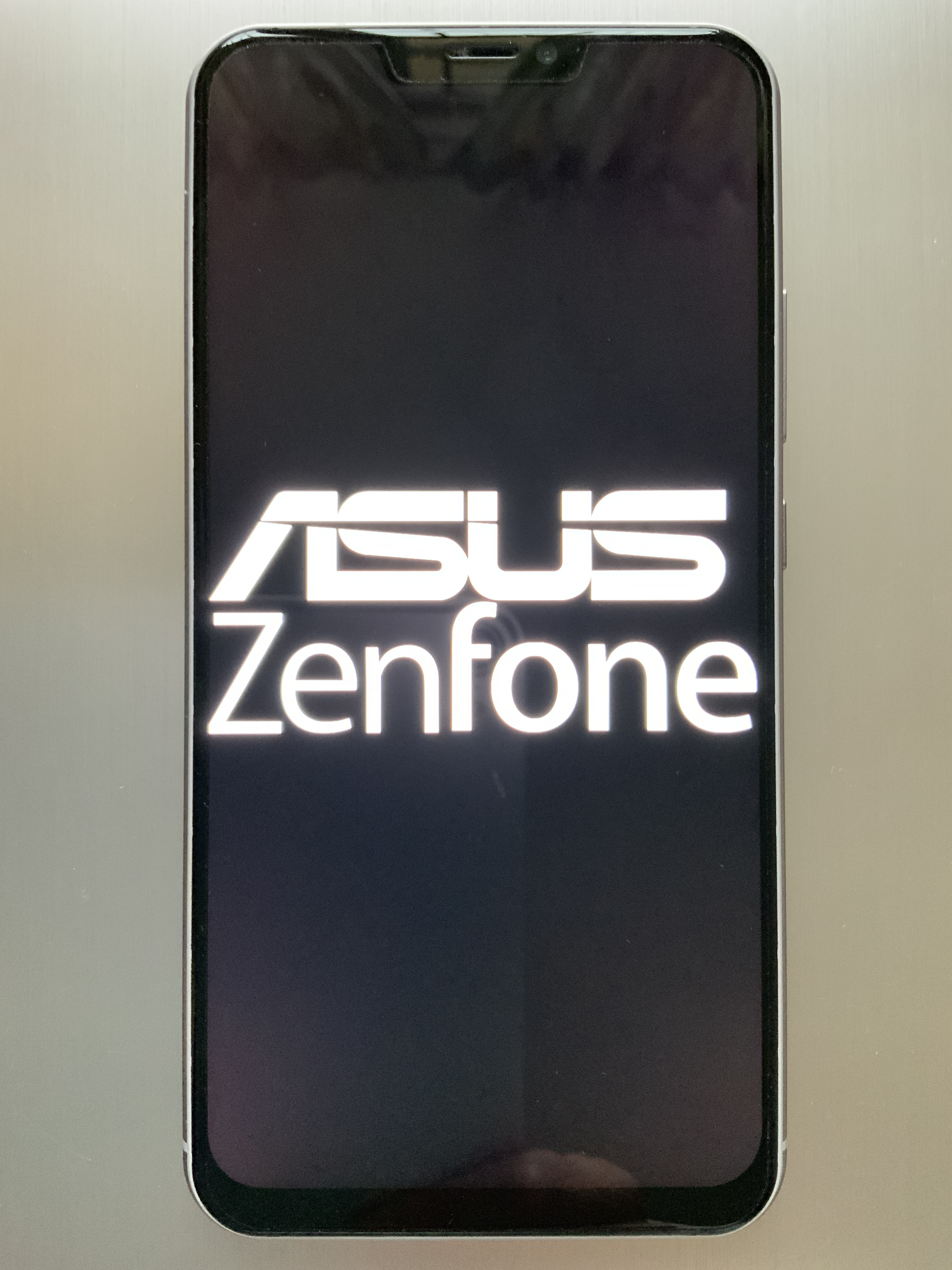
Asus ZenFone

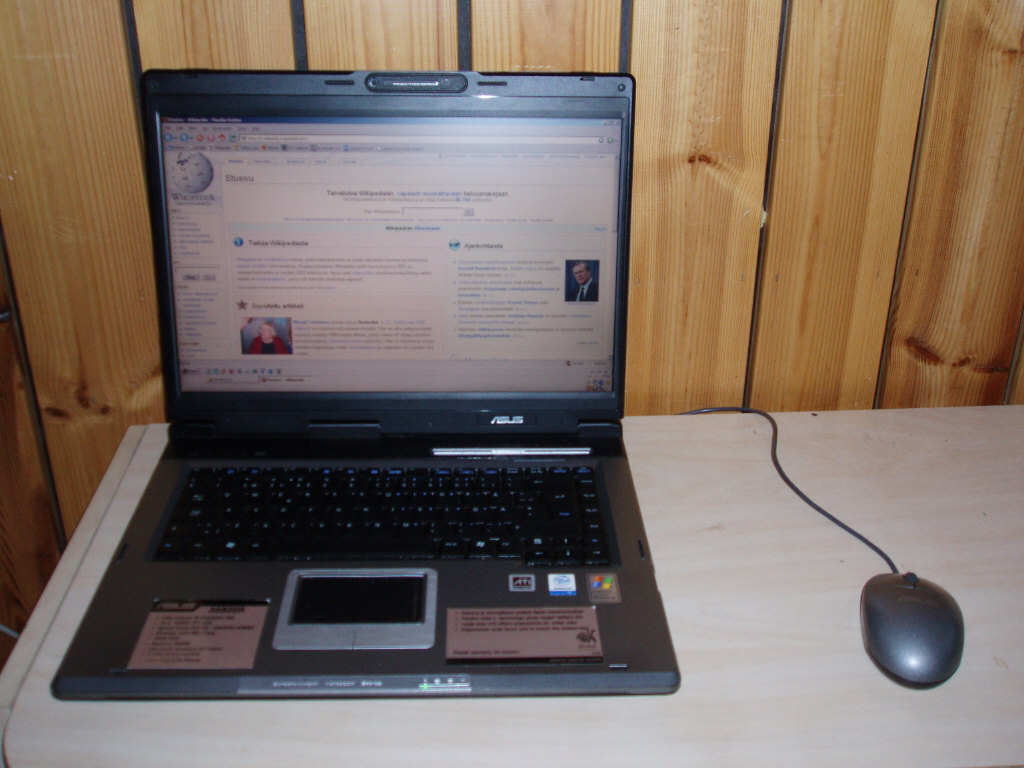
ASUS-laptop-A6B00R

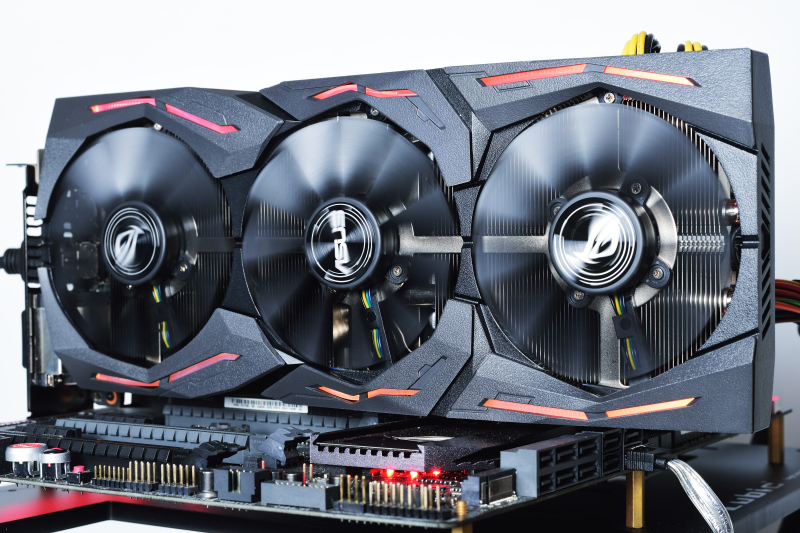
An Asus Nvidia GeForce GTX 1080 graphics card

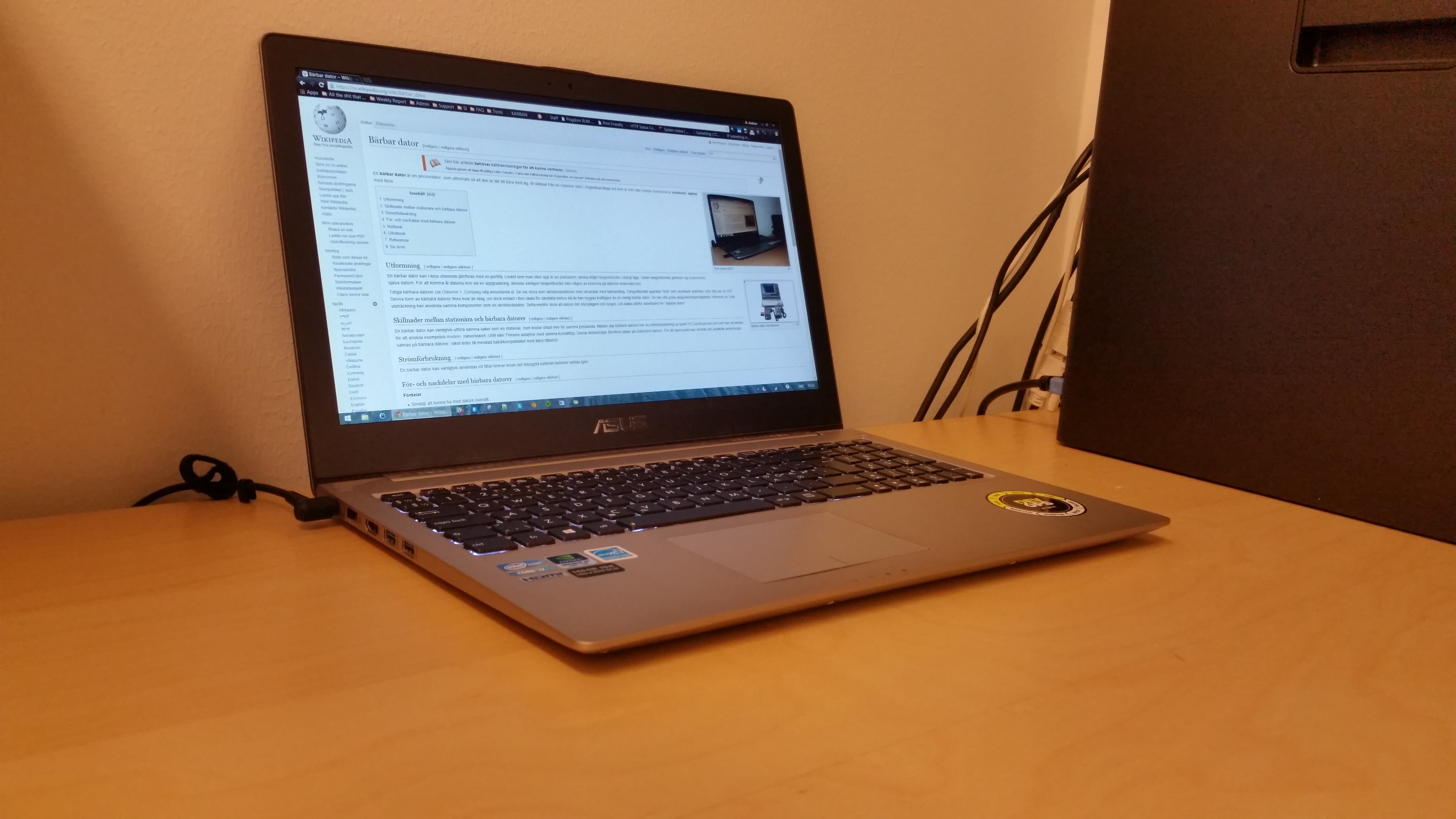
Laptop, av märket Asus

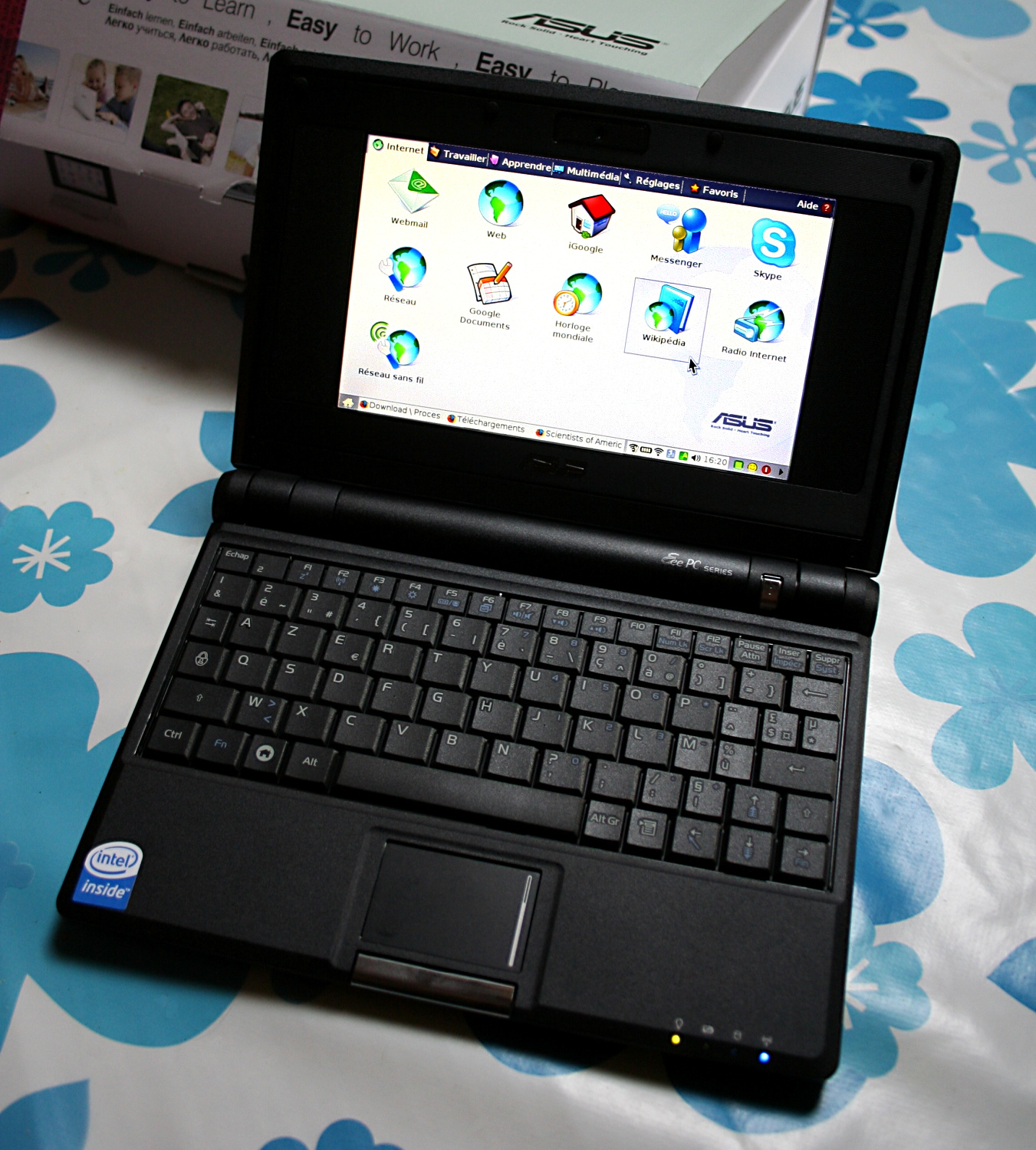
Asus eee pc desktop

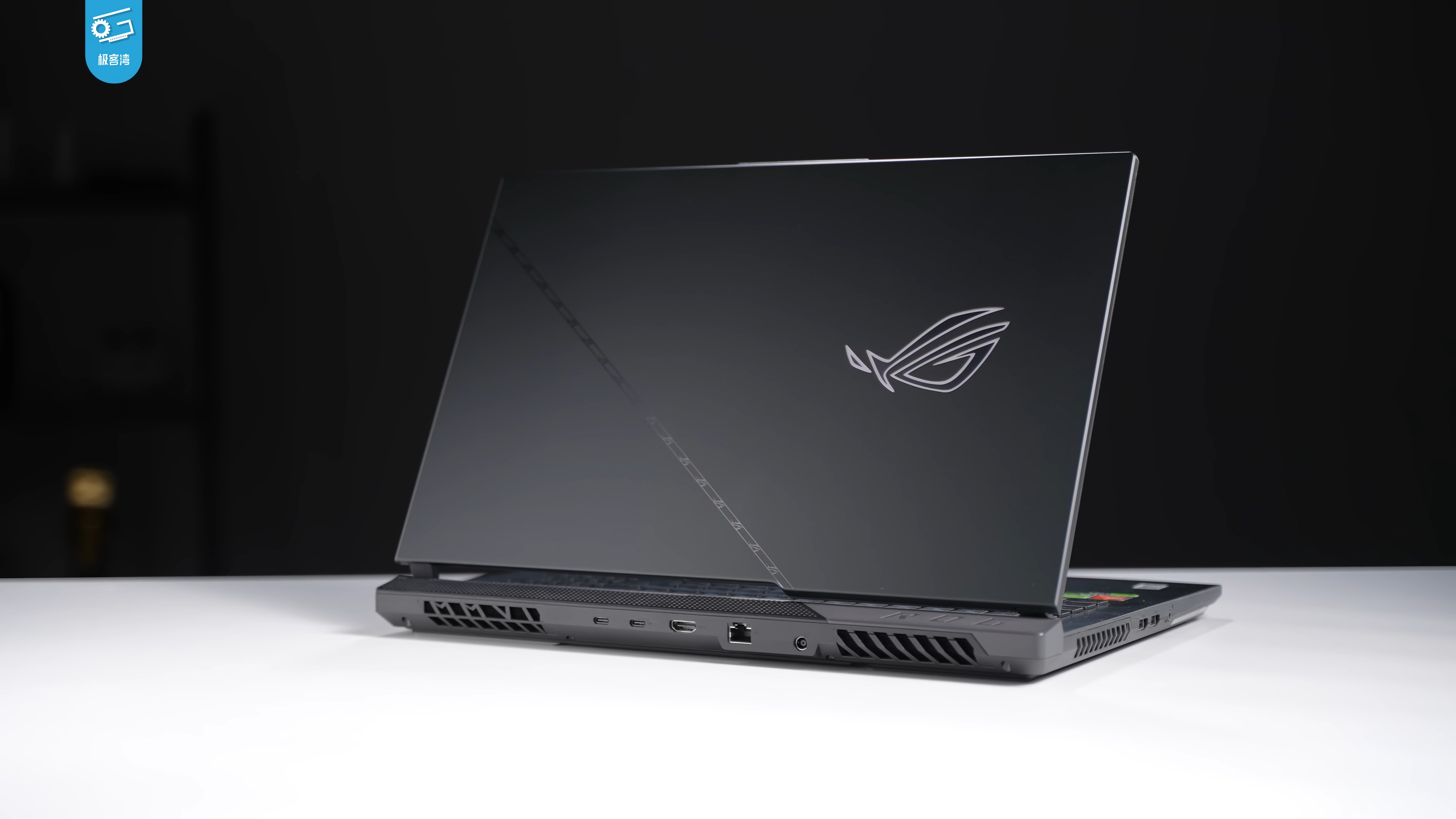
The ASUS ROG Strix Scar laptop with AMD Ryzen 9 7945HX, GeForce RTX 4090 and DDR5-4800 SODIMM RAM.

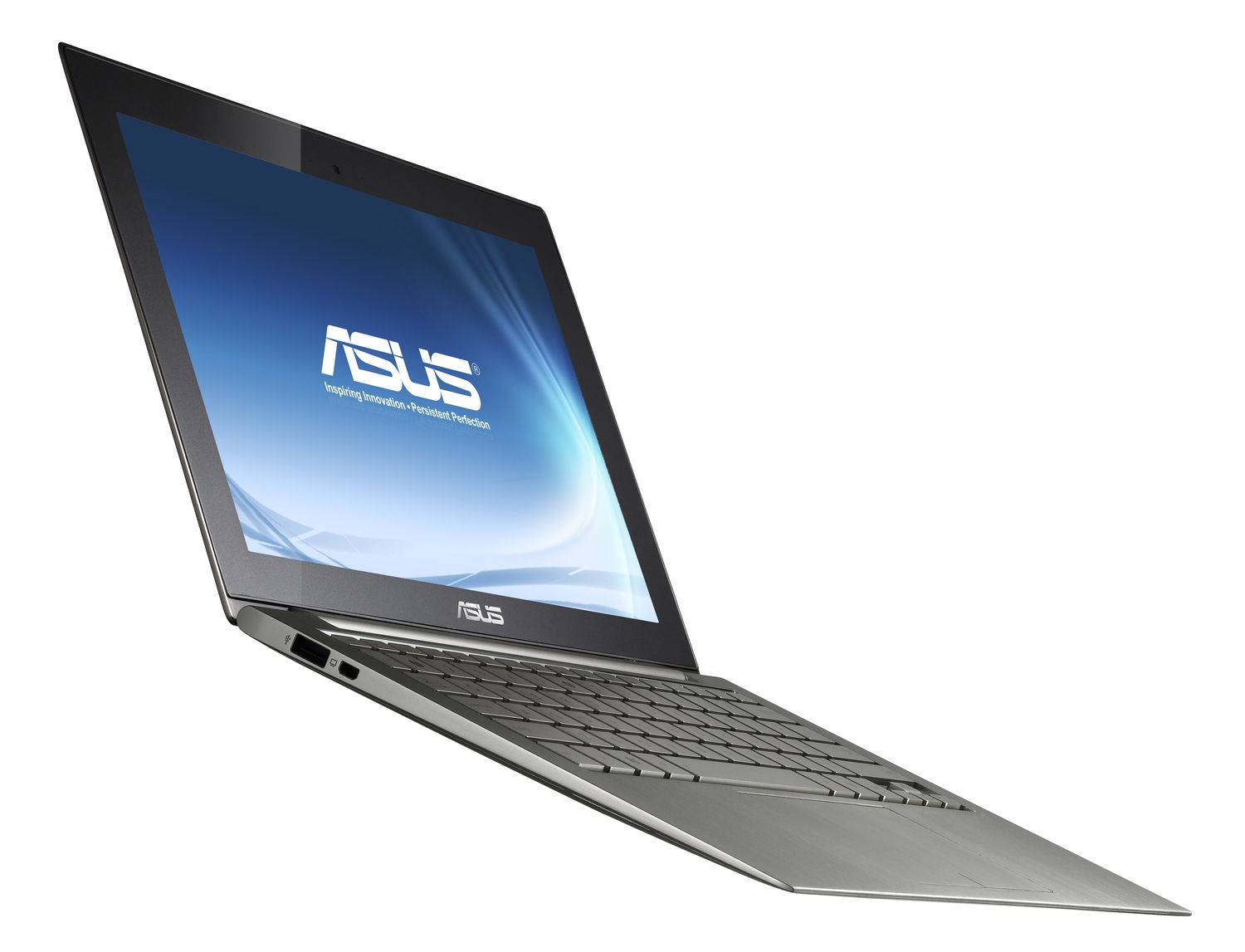
An Asus x21 ultrabook

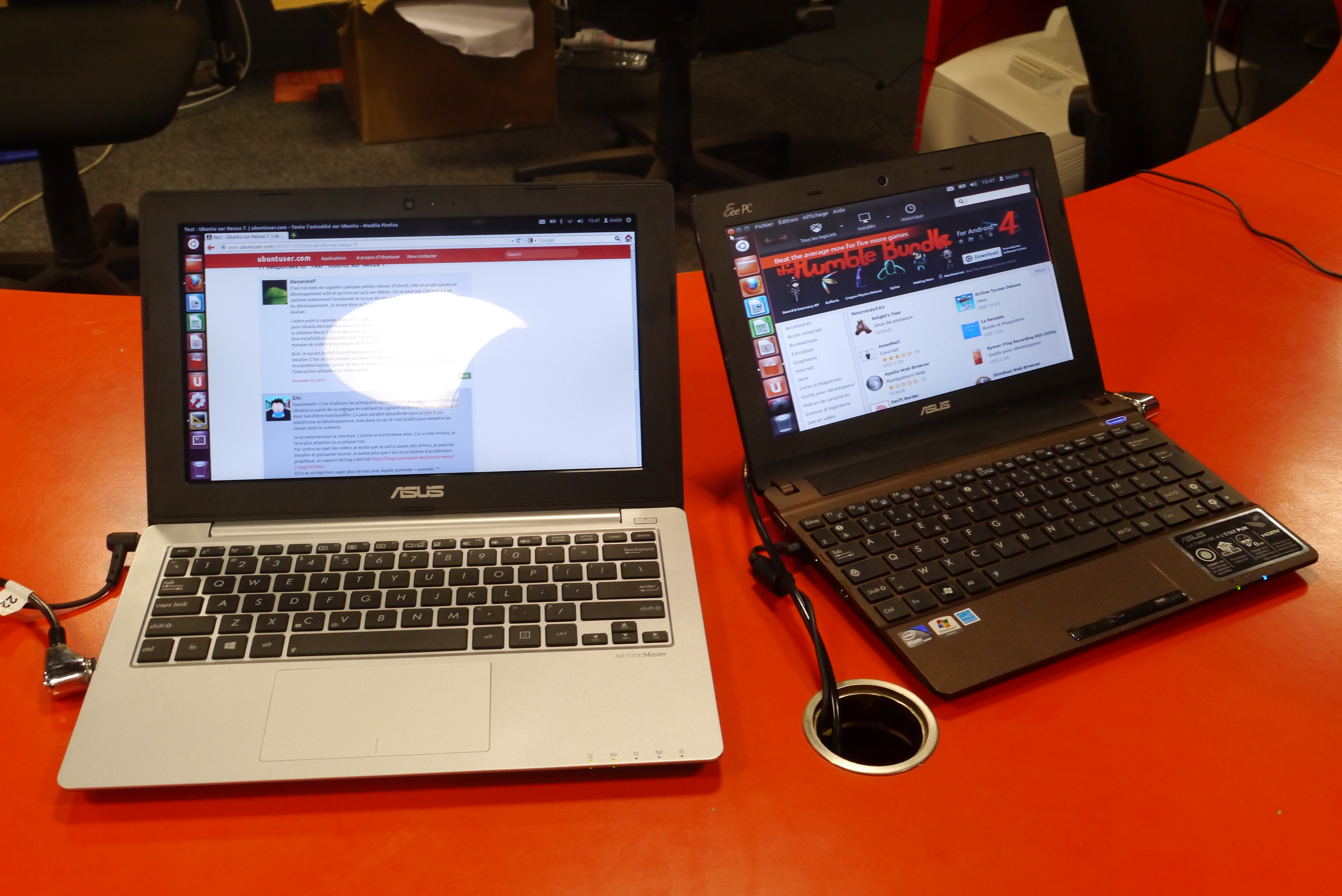
Asus laptops on a Ubuntu Party 12.10

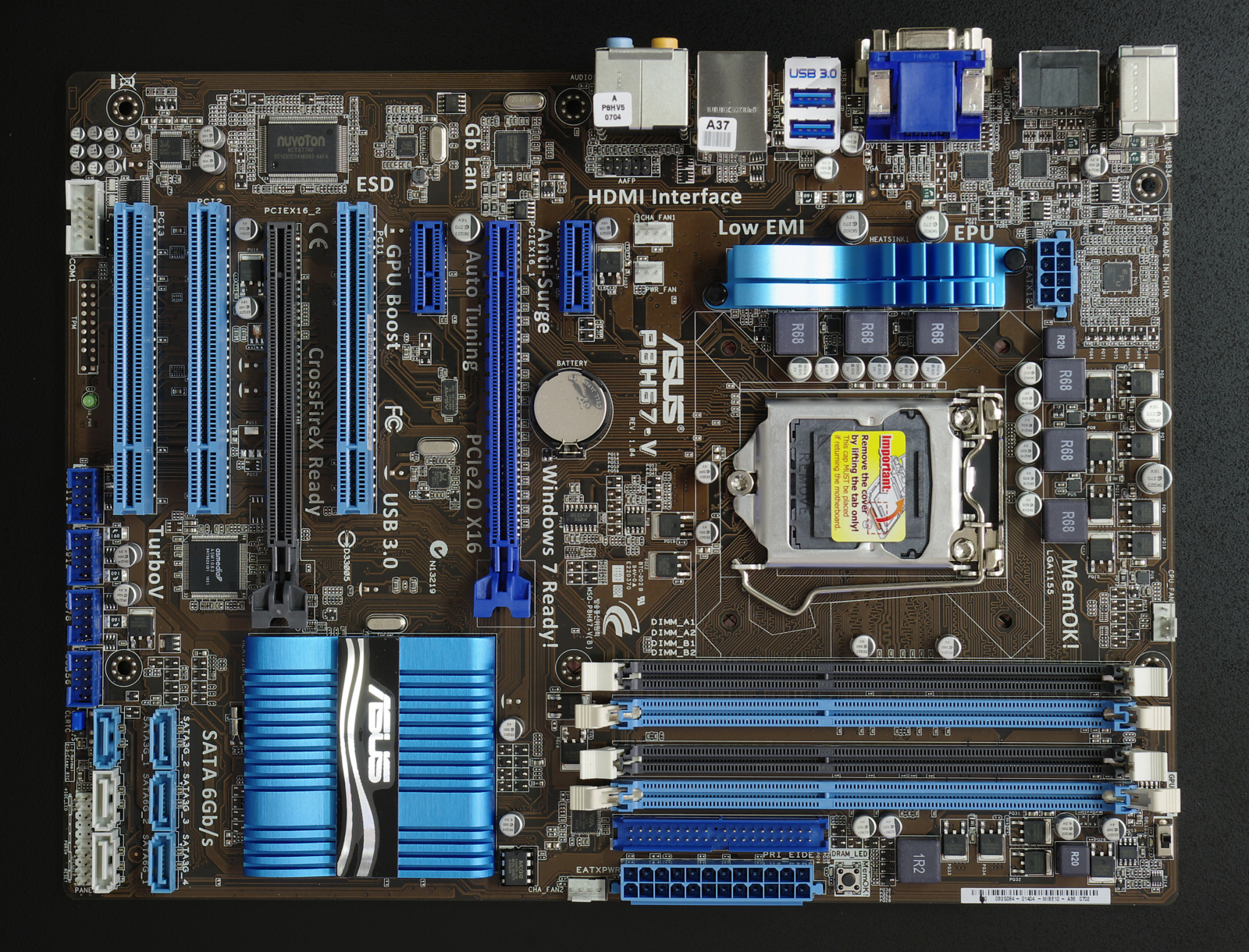
An Asus motherboard

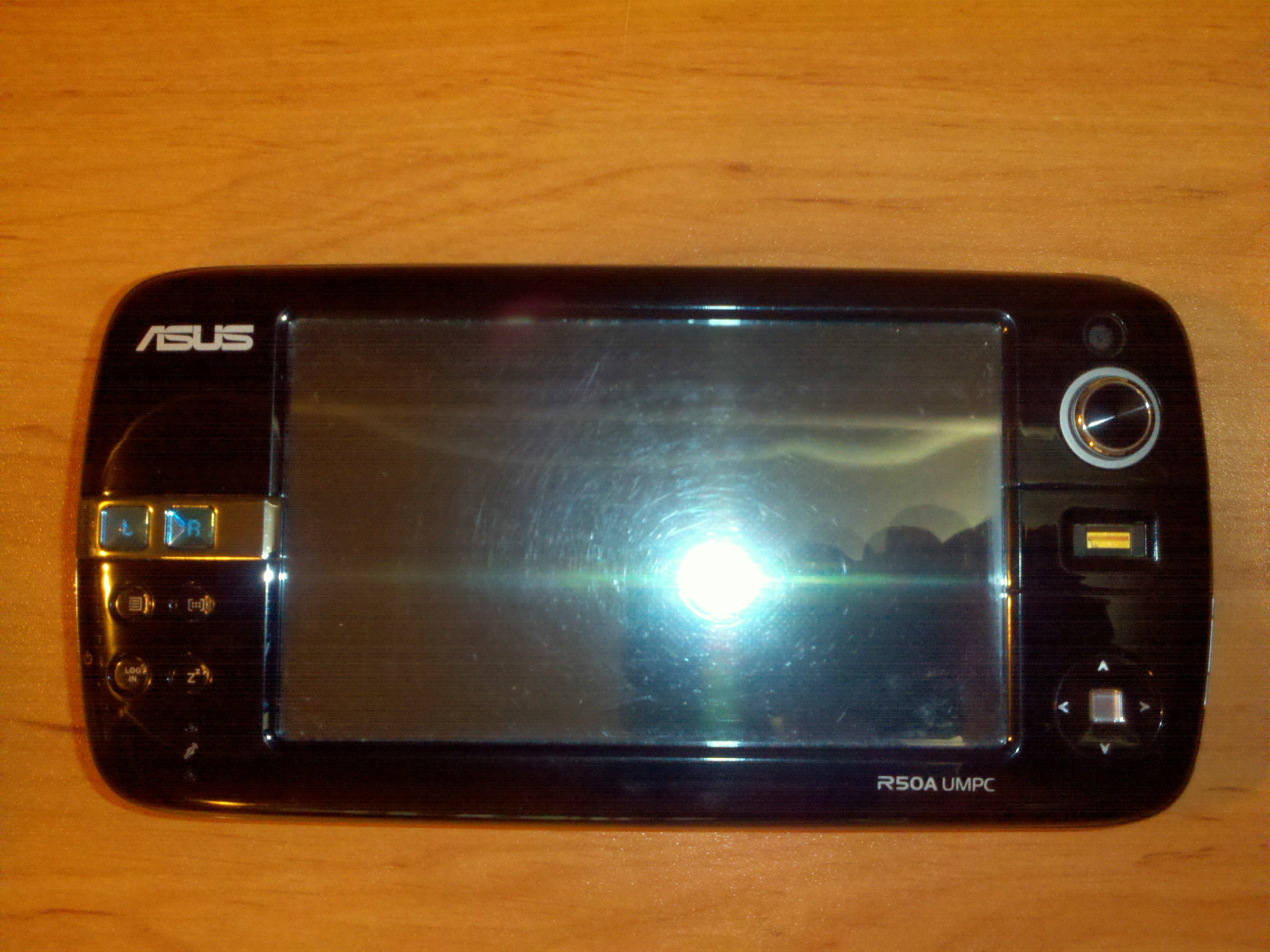
ASUS UMPC I

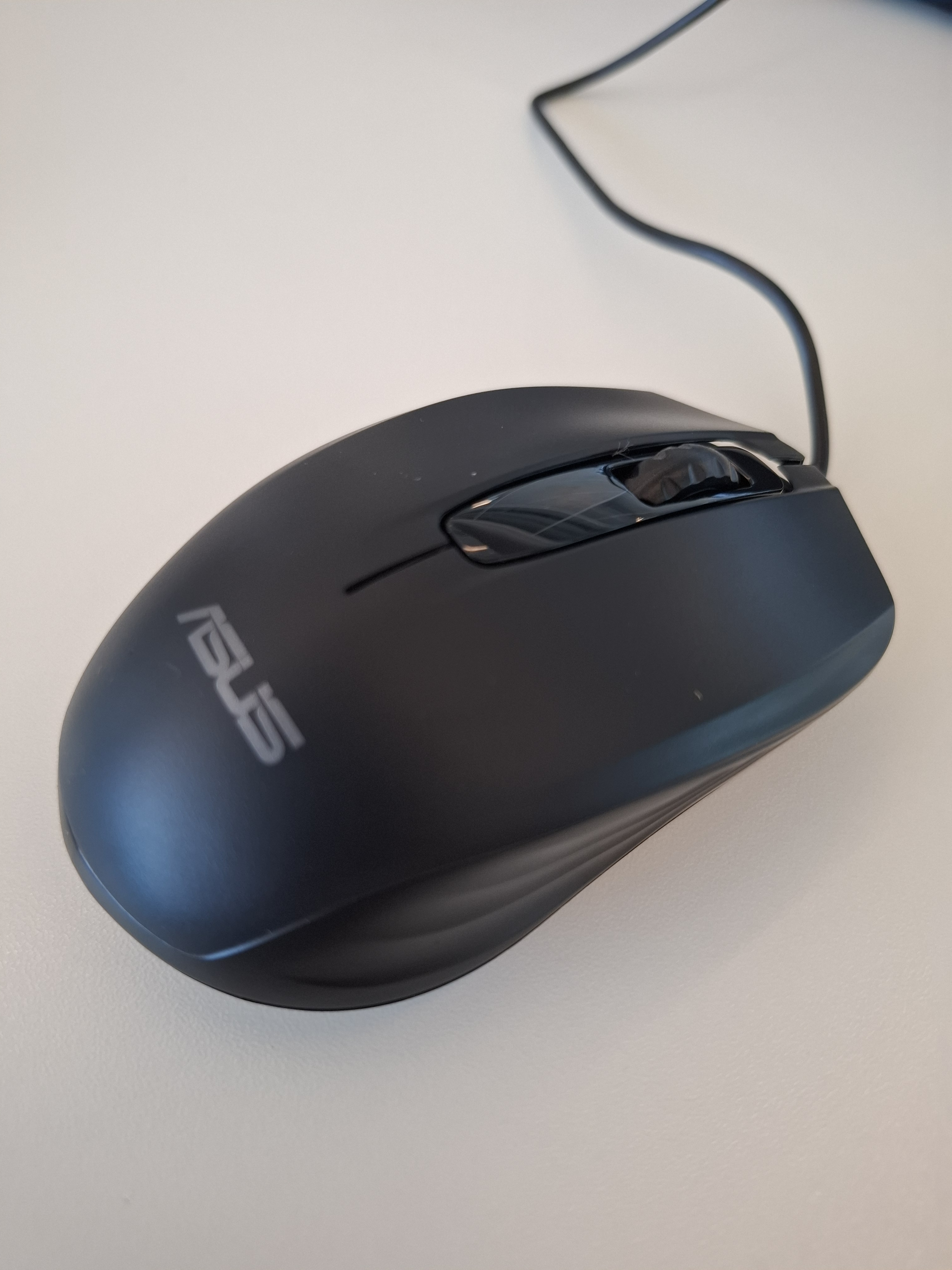
An Asus mouse

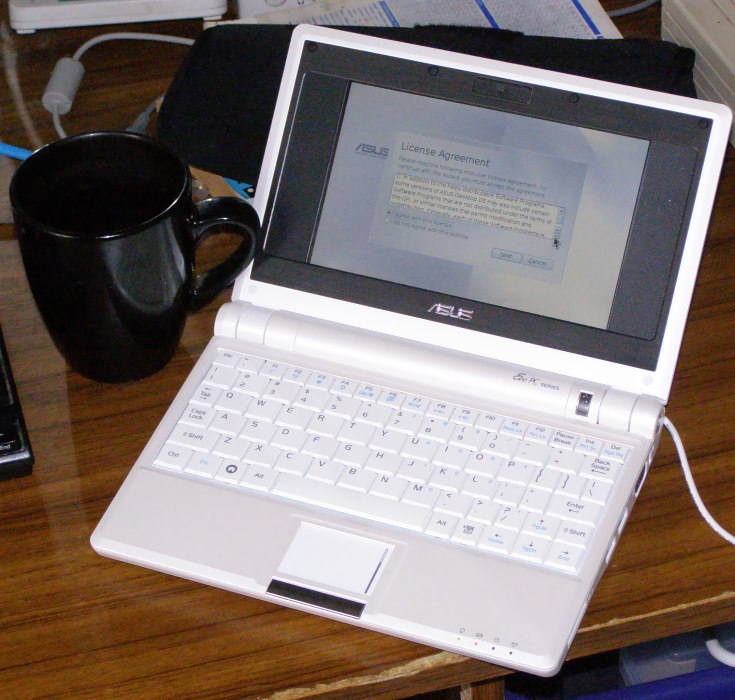
Asus EEE PC with License Agreement window

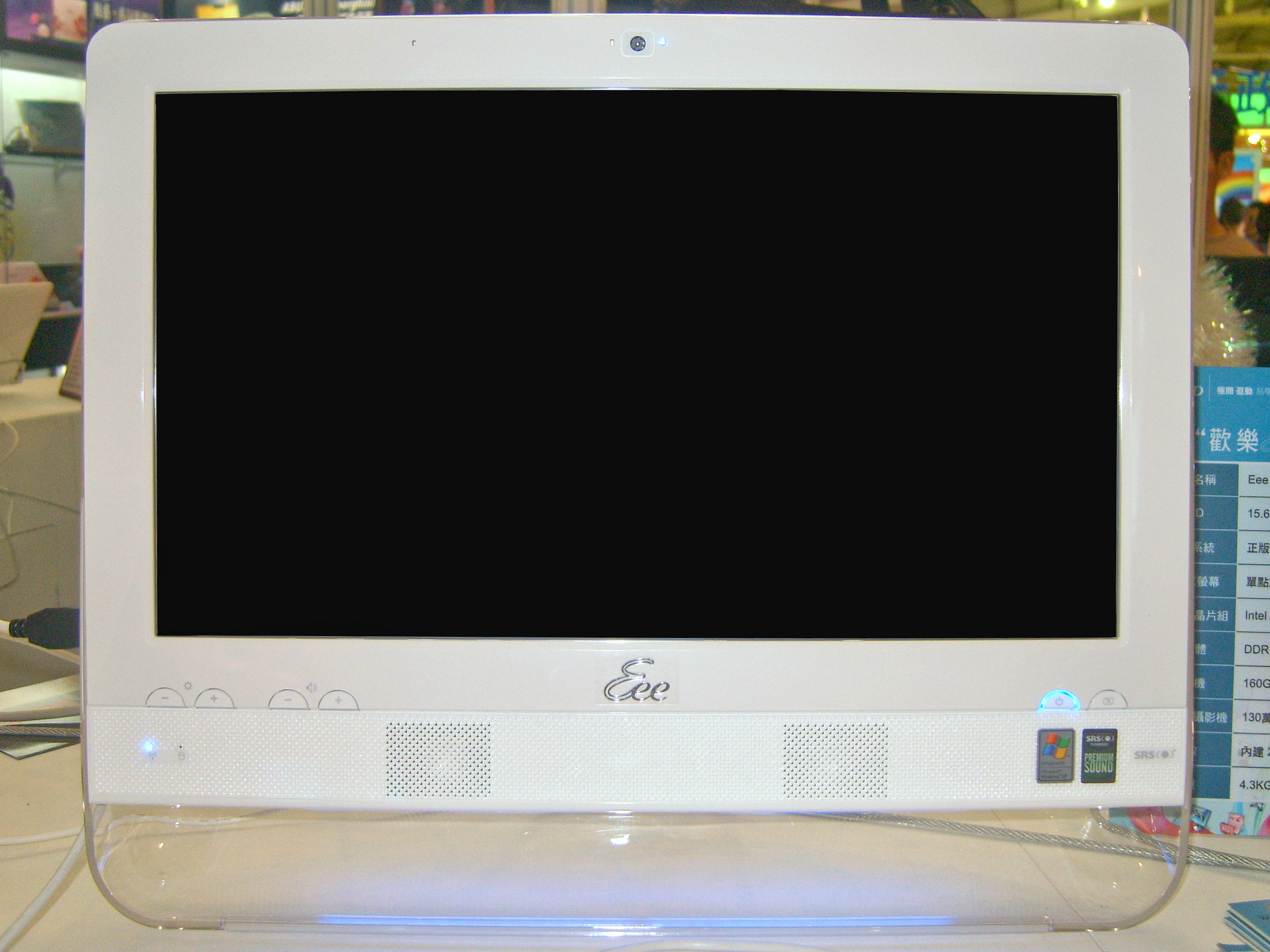
2008 Taichung IT Month Day2 ASUS Eee Top

=== Smartphones ===
Asus also launched many Android-based smartphones, predominantly with Intel rather than ARM processors and often with two sim slots. Asus is currently very influential in big mobile markets like India, China, and other Asian countries. It is known as the ZenFone series. Before the ZenFone line, Asus released feature phones such as the Asus v70 and smartphones running on Windows Mobile during the mid-2000s.

First Generation (2014)

- ZenFone 4 (available in either 4-inch or 4.5-inch variant)
- ZenFone 5
- ZenFone 6

Second Generation (2015)

- ZenFone Zoom
- ZenFone C
- ZenFone 2
- ZenFone 2 Laser
- ZenFone Max
- ZenFone Selfie
- ZenFone Go
- ZenFone 2E – made specifically for AT&T and released in 2015

Third Generation (2016)

- ZenFone AR
- ZenFone 3 series
- ZenFone Live series (L1 and L2)

Fourth Generation (2017)

- ZenFone 4 series

Fifth Generation (2018)

- ZenFone 5 series
- ZenFone Max series (M1 and M2)
- ROG Phone series

Sixth Generation (2019)

- ZenFone 6 series
- ROG Phone 2 series

Additionally, Asus also produced some hybrid devices with smartphones that can be docked in a tablet screen, known as PadFone series. The product lineups are:

- PadFone (A66)
- PadFone 2 (A68)
- PadFone Infinity (A80)
- PadFone Infinity Lite (A80C)
- new PadFone Infinity (A86)
- PadFone E (A68M)
- PadFone X (A91)
- PadFone S (PF500KL)
- PadFone Mini (PF400GC)
- PadFone Mini 4.3 (A11)
- PadFone X Mini (PF450CL, US only)

Most of Asus's smartphones are powered by Intel Atom processors with the exceptions of a few Padfone series and some ZenFone 2 models that use Qualcomm Snapdragon, though later phones in the series now either use Qualcomm Snapdragon or MediaTek systems-on-chip.

Seventh Generation (2020)

- ZenFone 7 series
- ROG Phone 3 series

Eighth Generation (2021)

- ZenFone 8 series
- ROG Phone 5 series

Ninth Generation (2022)

- ZenFone 9
- ROG Phone 6 series
- ROG Phone 6D series

Tenth Generation (2023)

- ZenFone 10
- ROG Phone 7 series

Eleventh Generation (2024)

- ZenFone 11 Ultra
- ROG Phone 8 series
- ROG Phone 9 series

=== 2-in-1s ===
- Asus Transformer
- Asus Vivobook Flip
- Zenbook Flip
- ExpertBook Flip
- Chromebook Flip

=== Laptops ===
- Zenbook
- Asus Vivobook
- AsusPro
- ExpertBook
- ProArt StudioBook
- The Ultimate Force (TUF Gaming)
- Republic Of Gamers (ROG Gaming)
- Chromebook
- EeeBook
- G Series
- N Series
- K Series
- X Series
- E Series
- Q Series
- U Series
- B Series
- V Series
- F Series
- A Series
- T Series

Discontinued series previously offered by Asus includes the EeeBook Series, K Series, X Series, E Series, Q Series, B Series, V Series, P Series, F Series, A Series, u2e Series and G Series.

=== Tablets ===
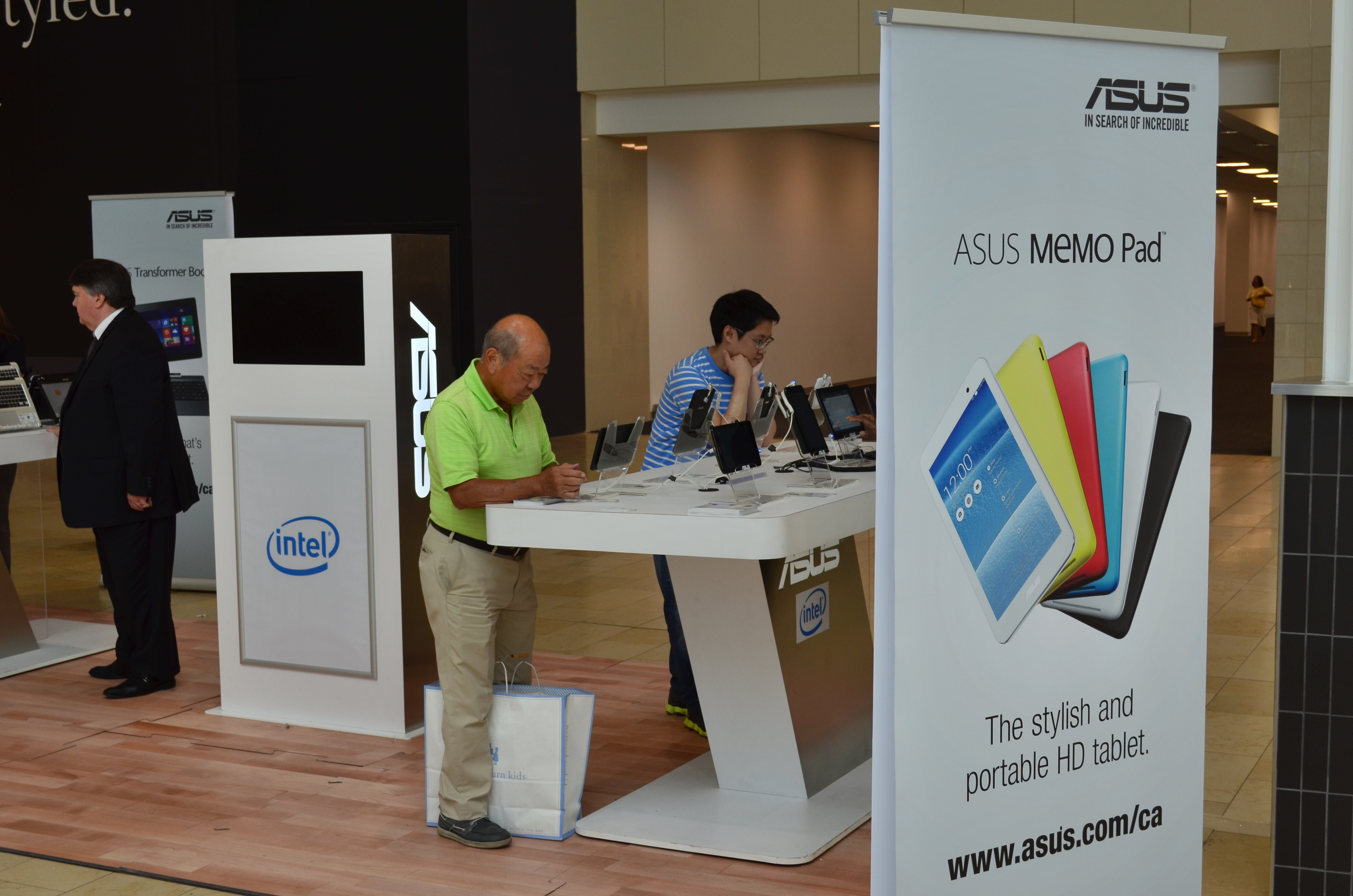
Asus Memo Pad road show

Two generations of the Nexus 7, manufactured for and branded as Google, were announced on 27 June 2012 for release in July 2012. On 24 July 2013, Asus announced a successor to the Google Nexus 7. Two days later, it was released. Asus has also been working with Microsoft in developing Windows 8 convertible tablets. In 2013, Asus revealed an Android-based tablet computer that, when attached to a keyboard, becomes a Windows 8 device, which it called the Transformer Book Trio. The keyboard can be attached to a third-party monitor, creating a desktop-like experience. Asus is also known for the following tablet computer lines:

- Eee Pad Transformer
- Eee Pad Slider
- Eee Slate
- Memo Pad 8
- VivoTab
- ZenPad: 7.0 Z370CG, C 7.0 Z170MG/Z170CG, 8.0 Z380KL, 8.0 Z380C*, S 8.0 Z580CA*, 10 Z300C* (Released 2015); 8.0 Z380M*, Z8 ZT581KL, 3 8.0 Z581KL, 10 Z300M*, 3S 10 Z500M*, Z10 ZT500KL (2016); 3S 8.0 Z582KL, Z8s ZT582KL, 3S 10 Z500KL (2017) (* no SIM)

=== Asus Server ===
GPU Rack Server

- ESC8000 G3 (Up to 8 GPU high density & hybrid computing)
- ESC4000 G3/G3s

2-Way Rack Server

- RS720Q-E8-RS8-P
- RS720Q-E8-RS12
- RS700-E8-RS8 V2
- RS700-E8-RS4 V2
- RS500-E8-RS4 V2
- RS500-E8-RS4 V2
- RS400-E8-PS2-F
- RS400-E8-PS2
- RS720-E8-RS24-ECP
- RS540-E8-RS36-ECP
- RS520-E8-RS12-E V2
- RS520-E8-RS8-E V2

1-Way Rack Server

- RS300-E9-PS4
- RS300-E9-RS4
- RS200-E9-PS2-F
- RS200-E9-PS2
- RS100-E9-PI2

2-Way Tower Server

- TS700-E8 V3 Series
- TS500-E8-PS4 V2

1-Way Tower Server

- TS300-E9-PS4
- TS100-E9-PI4

=== Desktop & All-in-One PCs ===
Tower PCs

- VivoPC
- ROG series
- Gaming series

Mini PCs

- Asus Tinker Board
- VivoMini

Chrome Devices

- Chromebox
- Chromebit

All-in-One PCs

- Zen AiO
- Vivo AiO
- Portable AiO

=== Eee line ===
From its launch in October 2007 and until the line was discontinued in January 2013, the Eee PC netbook garnered numerous awards, including Forbes Asia's Product of the Year, Stuff Magazine's Gadget of the Year and Computer of the Year, NBC.com's Best Travel Gadget, Computer Shopper's Best Netbook of 2008, PC Pro's Hardware of the Year, PC World's Best Netbook, and DIME magazine's 2008 Trend Award Winner.

Asus subsequently added several products to its Eee lineup, including:

- Eee Box PC, a compact nettop
- Eee Top, an all-in-one touchscreen computer housed in an LCD monitor enclosure,
- Eee Stick, a plug-and-play wireless controller for the PC platform that translates users' physical hand motions into corresponding movements onscreen
- Eee Pad Transformer, is a tablet computer that runs the Android operating system.
- Eee Pad Transformer Prime, the successor to the original Transformer.

On 6 March 2009, Asus debuted its Eee Box B202, which PCMag saw as "the desktop equivalent of the Asus Eee PC", (the "Asus Eee Box" computer line was later renamed in 2010 to "Asus Eee Box PC").

=== Essentio Series ===
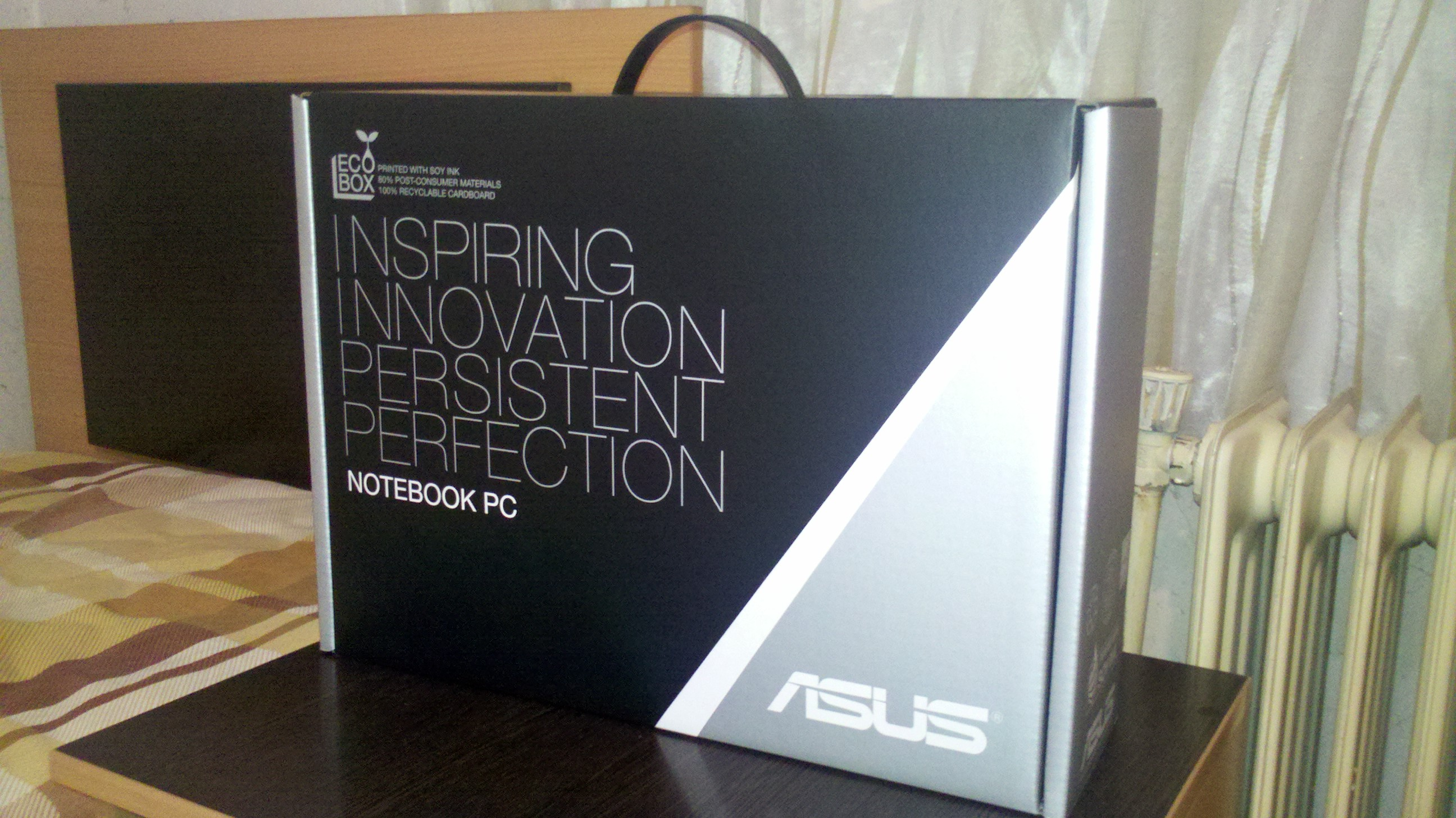
Asus N55 S Package

Essentio is a line of desktop PCs. As of December 2011 the line consisted of the CG Series (designed for gaming), the CM series (for entertainment and home use) and the CS and CP slimline series.

=== Digital media receivers ===
Asus sells digital media receivers under the name Asus O!Play.

=== GPS devices ===
Asus produces the R700T GPS device, which incorporates Traffic Message Channel.

=== Republic of Gamers ===
Asus Republic of Gamers logo

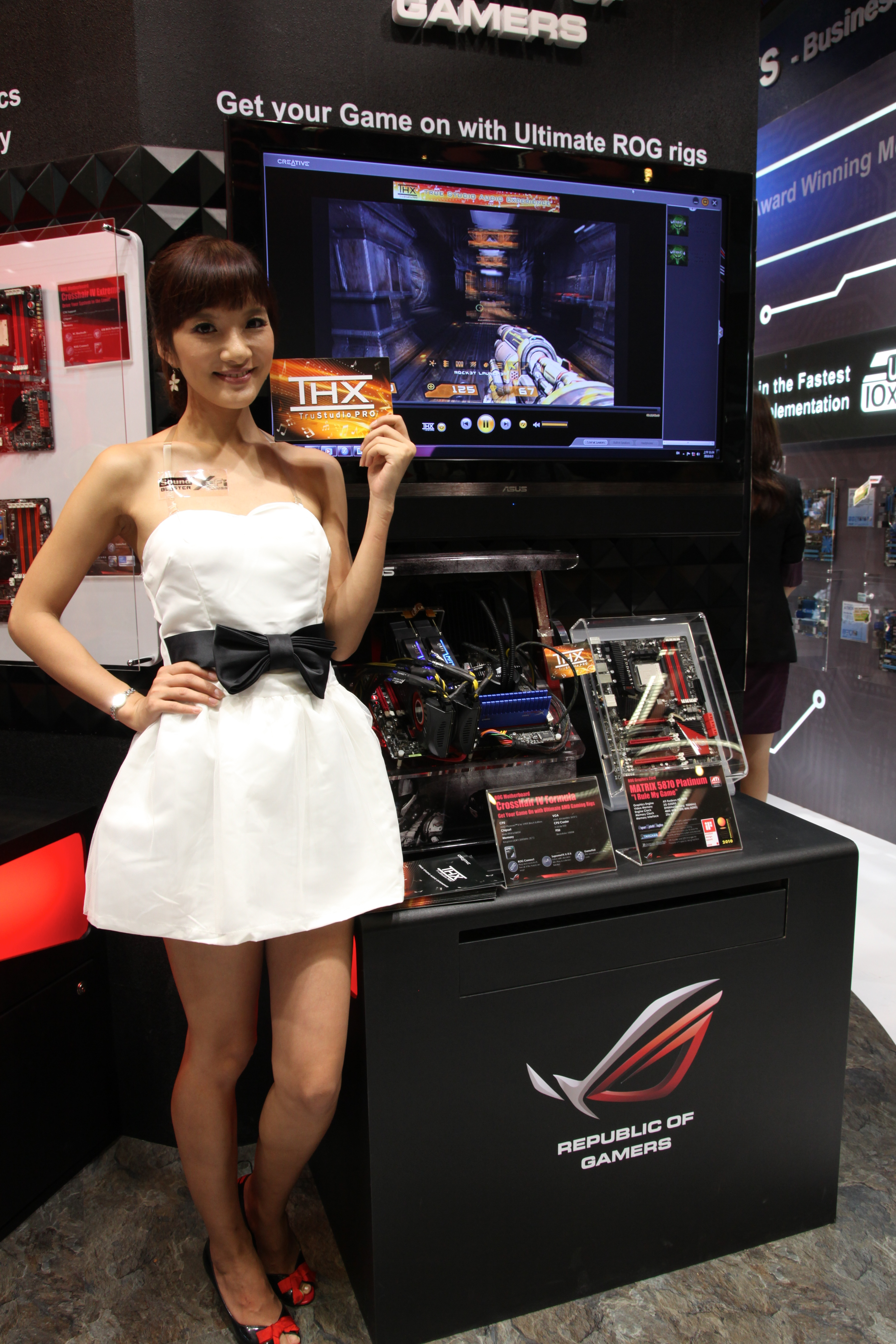
An Asus promotional model presenting ROG products

Republic of Gamers (ROG) is a brand used by Asus since 2006, encompassing a range of computer hardware, personal computers, peripherals, and accessories.

AMD graphics cards were marketed under the Arez brand due to the Nvidia's GeForce Partner Program.

In 2013, Asus launched the RAIDR Express, a PCI express-based RAID 0 SSD subsystem with two SSDs on one PCB.

In January 2022, Asus announced the ROG Flow Z13 during ROG's CES 2022 launch event. Equipped with Intel's high-performance Core i9 processor and Nvidia's GeForce RTX 3050 Ti graphics card, it marked a breakthrough for the tablet computer market. It is the world's first RTX 30-series computer in tablet form factor.

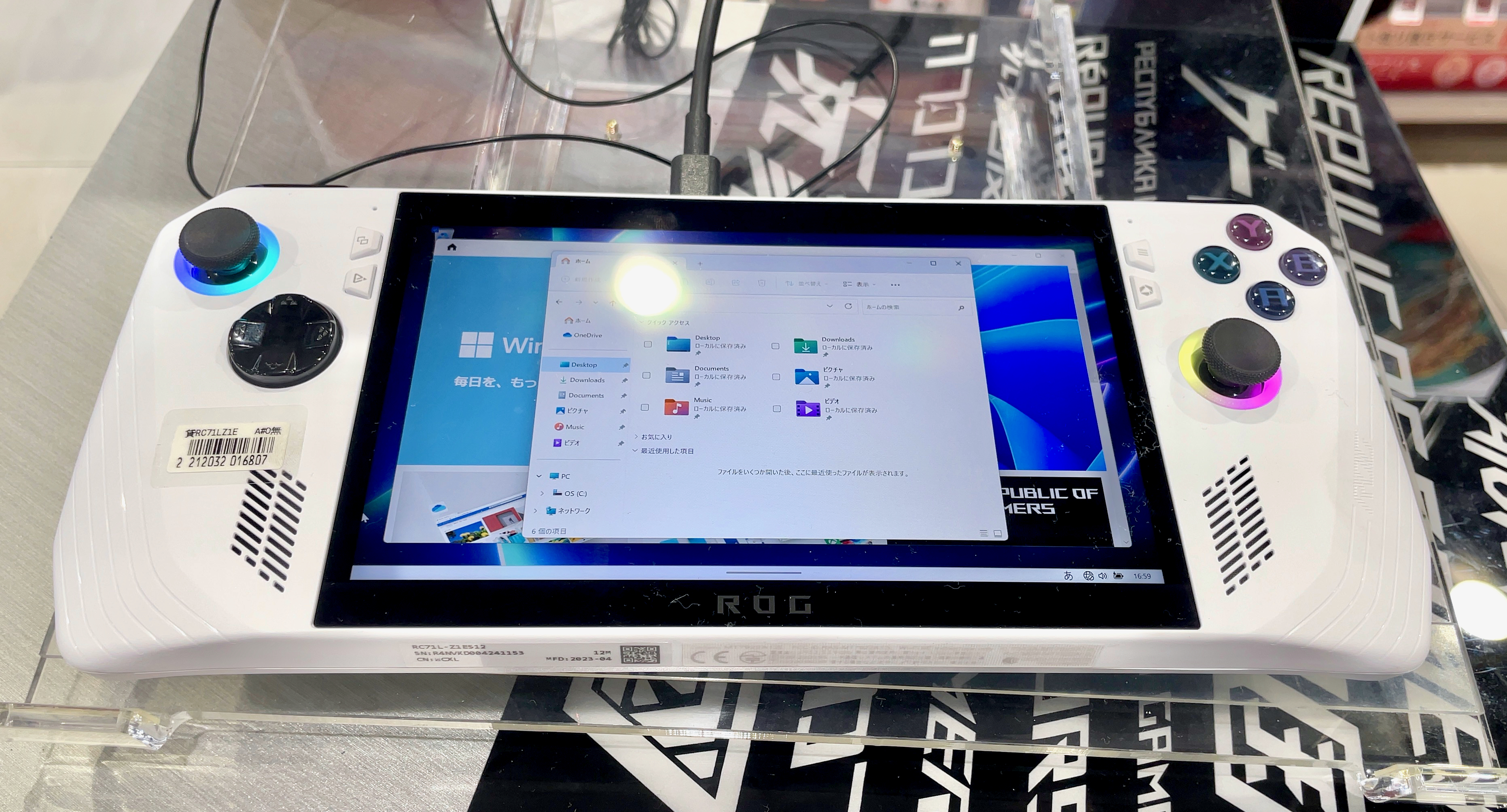
ASUS ROG Ally handheld gaming computer

In June 2023, Asus released the ROG Ally, a handheld device designed to compete with the Steam Deck. The Ally possesses a 7-inch (diagonal), 1080p touchscreen display with a 120 Hz refresh rate capability and a 16:9 aspect ratio, versus the Steam Deck's panel that only manages 800p and 60 Hz with a 16:10 aspect ratio. In June 2025, the ROG Xbox Ally, co-developed by Asus and Microsoft, was unveiled during Xbox Games Showcase, later releasing on 16 October 2025.

==== Gaming Peripherals ====
In 2023, ROG released the ROG Azoth, a wireless mechanical keyboard incorporating features commonly associated with custom keyboards, including a gasket-mounted design, hot-swappable switches and internal sound-dampening layers.

Also in 2023, ROG partnered with Aim Lab to release the Harpe Ace Aim Lab Edition, a 54 g wireless gaming mouse designed for competitive gaming. Aim Lab's software could be used to analyze a player's performance and adjust settings for the mouse. Its successor, the Harpe II Ace, weighs 48 g and was developed with input from esports players, including Valorant player Maximilian "Demon1" Mazanov. The Harpe II Ace also uses Gear Link, a web-based utility for configuring settings such as DPI, polling rate and lighting.

ROG later adopted Hall-effect magnetic switches in the Falchion Ace HFX keyboard, providing adjustable actuation, rapid trigger, and a last-input-priority feature called Speed Tap. In 2026, ROG collaborated with HiFiMan on the Kithara, an open-back gaming headset using planar-magnetic drivers, aimed at audiophile gamers.

=== The Ultimate Force ===
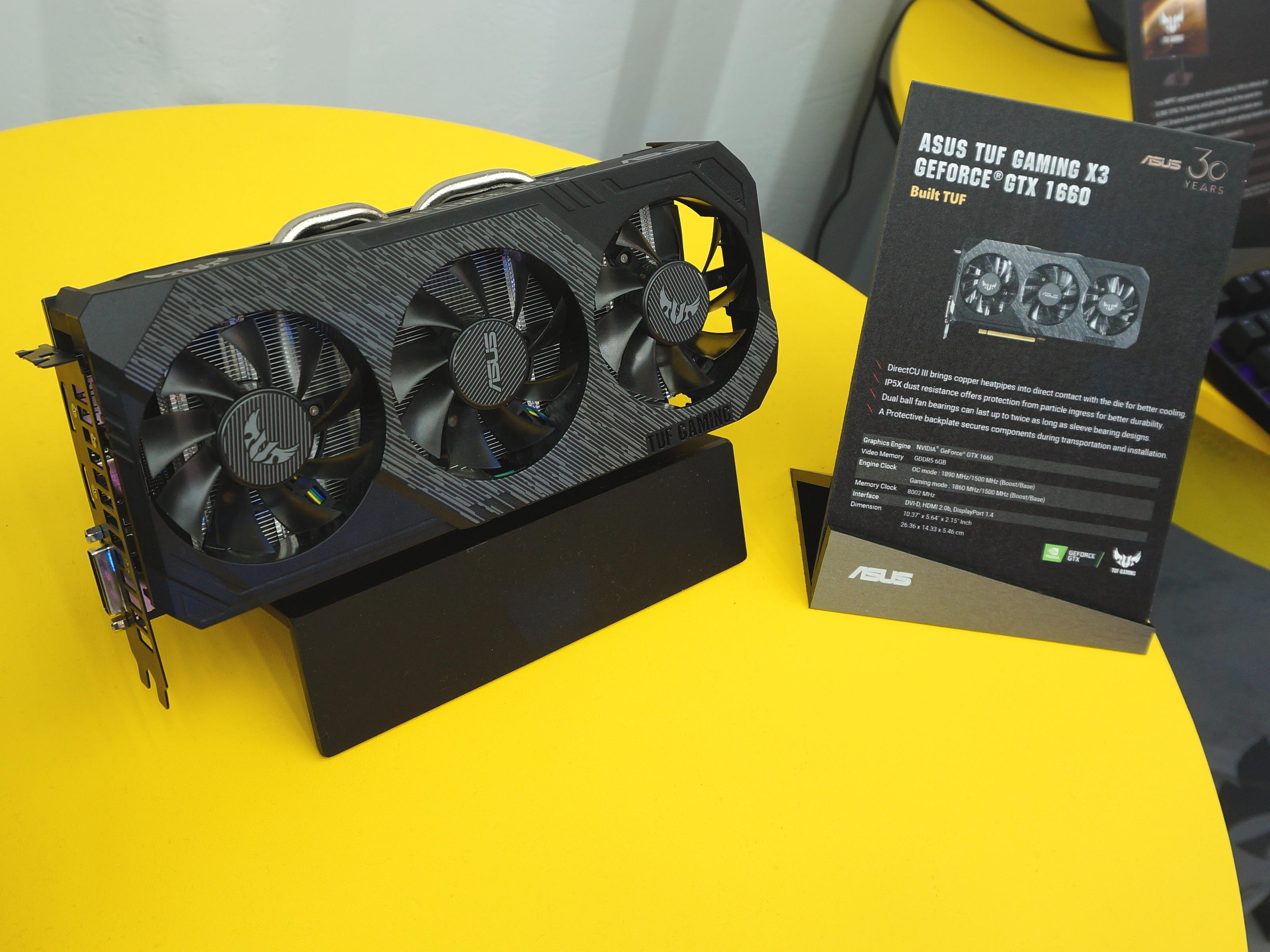
Nvidia GeForce GTX 1660 Asus TUF Gaming X3

The Ultimate Force (TUF) is a brand used by Asus since about 2009. The brand is for Asus affordable gaming products, focusing on performance and durability.

=== Sound cards ===
Asus released its first sound card, the Xonar DX, in February 2008. The Xonar DX was able to emulate the EAX 5.0 effects through the Asus GX software while also supporting Open AL and DTS-connect. In July 2008 Asus launched the Xonar D1, which offered largely similar features to the Xonar DX but connected to the motherboard through the PCI interface instead of the PCI-E ×1 connection of the Xonar DX. Asus then released the Xonar HDAV 1.3, which was the first solution enabling loss-less HD audio bit streaming to AV receivers.

In May 2009, Asus launched the Essence ST sound card, targeted at high-end audiophiles, and featuring 124 dB SNR rating and precision audio clock tuning. In the same month, Asus refreshed the HDAV family by releasing the HDAV 1.3 slim, a card targeted for HTPC users offering similar functionality to HDAV 1.3 but in a smaller form. During Computex 2010, Asus introduced its Xonar Xense, an audio bundle composed of the Xense sound card and a special edition of the Sennheiser PC350 headset. In August 2010, Asus released the Xonar DG sound card targeted at budget buyers and offering 5.1 surround sound support, 105 dB SNR rating, support for Dolby headphone and GX 2.5 support for emulating EAX 5.0 technology.

=== Asus Vivo PC line ===
Asus entered the box-PC market with the Vivo PC line in November 2013. Asus Vivo PCs come without a pre-installed Windows operating system.

On 23 October 2013, Asus launched two models of VivoPCs in India. VivoPC was initially announced with Intel Celeron processor equipped VM40B model. But in India, the company released VivoPC along with a new model called VC60 which is equipped with Intel Core series processors.

=== Portable monitors ===
In 2013, Asus released the MB168B, a USB 3.0-powered, portable external monitor. The base model shipped with a resolution of 1366 × 768, while the MB168B+ had a resolution of 1920 × 1080. At the time of its release, the MB168B+ was the only 1080p portable monitor. According to Asus, it is the "world's slimmest and lightest USB monitor".

=== Desktop monitors ===
- ROG Swift OLED PG27UCDM( 4K, 27", QD-OLED, 240Hz )
- ROG Swift OLED PG32UCDM
- ROG Swift OLED PG27AQDP
- ROG Swift OLED PG27AQDM
- ROG Swift OLED PG42UQ
- ROG Swift OLED PG48UQ
- ROG Swift PG279QM (2560x1440, 240 Hz, IPS)
- ROG Swift PG27AQN (2560x1440, 360 Hz, IPS)
- ROG Swift PG279Q
- ROG Swift PG348Q
- ROG Swift PG35VQ
- ROG Swift PB27UQ
- ROG Strix XG27AQ
- ROG Strix XG27AQM
- ROG Strix XG27AQMR
- ROG Strix XG27AQV
- MX34VQ
- VZ279Q

=== Motherboards ===
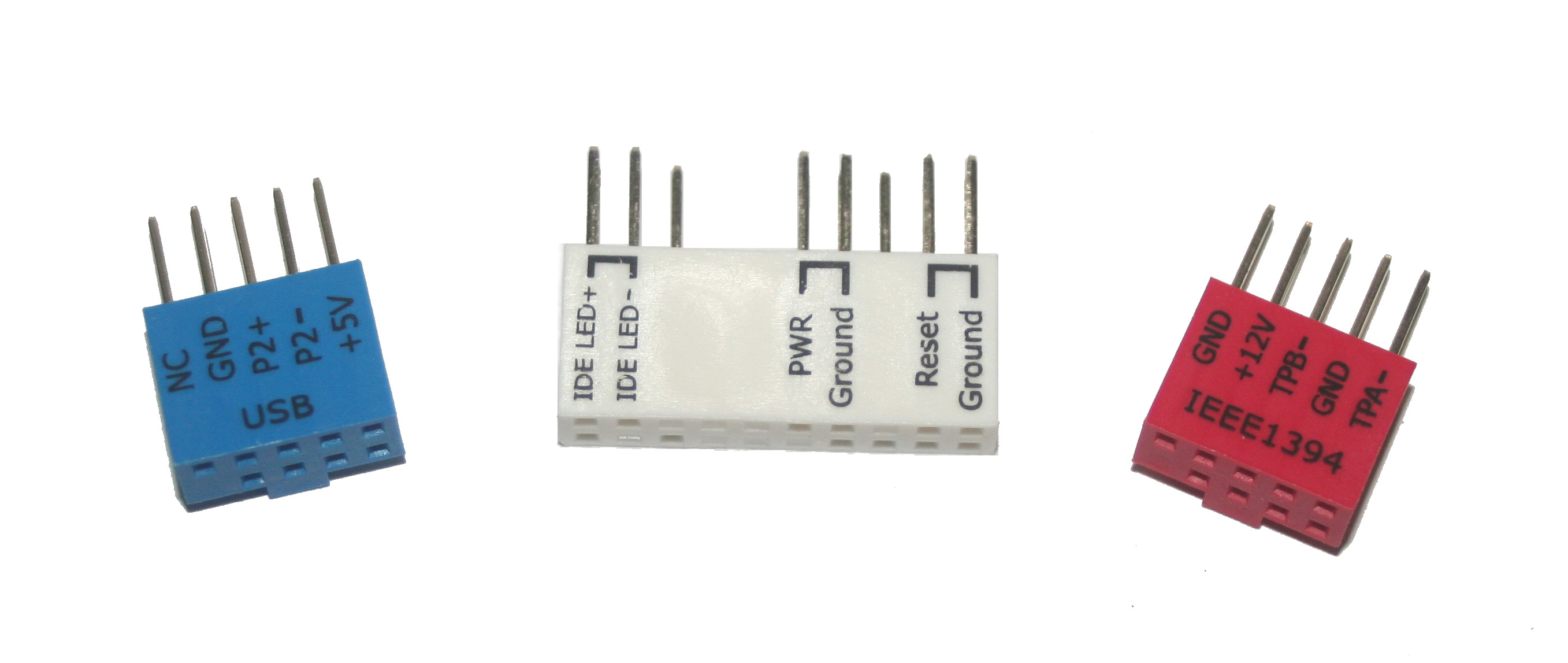
Q-Connector

Asus motherboards sometimes include a Q-Connector which sits in between the motherboard front panel connectors and the front panel cables. The Q-Connector is marked with bigger text than the front panel connectors on the motherboard, as well as protruding from the motherboard, limiting obstruction from heatsinks and other connectors.

The Q-connector allows the many front-panel connections to be removed as a single unit for maintenance. This greatly reduces the risk of incorrect connections when reassembling.

=== ExpertCenter Series ===
The ASUS ExpertCenter series of business workstations, desktop PCs, and Mini PCs was first released in 2020. The series mainly focus on security and component quality.

==== ASUS ExpertCenter Desktops ====
ASUS ExpertCenter desktops come in a variety of form factors, mainly the ExpertCenter B series and ExpertCenter P series. The ExpertCenter B series is mainly for enterprise use, and the ExpertCenter P series is for small businesses and individual professional users.

==== ASUS ExpertCenter Pro Workstation ====
The ASUS ExpertCenter Pro series is a line of professional desktop computers for Enterprise and Business. The line-up typically includes numerical segments like 500, 700, and 900 series, with specialized designations such as N (NVIDIA-based systems), A (AMD-based systems), and I (Intel-based systems) variants. Specific naming conventions may vary depending on product generation and market.

For instance, the ExpertCenter Pro ET900N G3, which was introduced during CES 2026, based on NVIDIA's Grace Blackwell platform, which combines an ARM-based Grace CPU with a Blackwell GPU to enable high-bandwidth, it enabling organizations to run complex workloads locally without relying solely on cloud infrastructure.

== Other initiatives ==
=== Esports ===
Asus ROG has been an active advocate for esports, having established some of its very own professional gaming teams.

In January 2021, ROG announced the establishment of a new esports academy in India, with plans to scout and train professional gamers for the Counter-Strike: Global Offensive (CS:GO) PC game. The initiative will provide shortlisted gamers with coaching, gaming equipment, and stipends to prepare them for competitive esports tournaments on both the national and international levels.

== Environmental record ==
=== GreenAsus ===
In 2000, Asus launched GreenAsus, a company-wide sustainable computing initiative overseen by a steering committee led by Jonney Shih, the Chairman of Asus since 1993. According to the company, Asus pursues green policies in "Design, Procurement, Manufacturing, and Marketing."

=== Recognition ===
In 2006, Asus obtained IECQ (IEC Quality Assessment System for Electronic Components) and HSPM (Hazardous Substance Process Management) certification for its headquarters and all of its manufacturing sites.

In 2007, Oekom Research, an independent research institute specializing in corporate responsibility assessment, recognized Asus as a "highly environmental friendly company" in the "Computers, Peripherals and Office Electronics Industry".

In October 2008, Asus received 11 Electronic Product Environmental Assessment Tool (EPEAT) Gold Awards for its products, including four of its N-Series notebooks, namely the N10, N20, N50, and N80. In the following month, it received EU Flower certification for the same N-Series notebooks at an award ceremony held in Prague. In December 2008, Det Norske Veritas conferred the world's first EuP (Energy-using Product) certification for portable notebooks on these machines.

=== Recycling campaign ===
In April 2008, Asus launched its "PC Recycling for a Brighter Future" program in collaboration with Intel and with Tsann Kuen Enterprise Co. The program collected more than 1,200 desktop computers, notebooks and CRT/LCD monitors, refurbished them and donated them to 122 elementary and junior high schools, five aboriginal communities and the Tzu Chi Stem Cell Center.

== Controversies ==
In September 2008, PC Pro discovered through a reader that Asus had accidentally shipped laptops that contained cracked and unlicensed software. Both physical machines and recovery CDs contained confidential documents from Microsoft and other organizations, internal Asus documents, and sensitive personal information including CVs. At the time, an Asus spokesperson promised an investigation at "quite a high level", but declined to comment on how the files got on the machines and recovery media. It was demonstrated that an unattended installation of Windows Vista could accidentally copy material from a flash drive with a parameter in the "unattend.xml" file on the personal flash drive being used to script the installation.

In February 2014, a security vulnerability in the AiCloud functions on a number of Asus routers was compromised to distribute a text file warning of a vulnerability, disclosed in June 2013, allowing the ability to "traverse to any external storage plugged in through the USB ports on the back of the router" via the open internet. Before making the vulnerability public, the researcher was told by Asus that the behavior was "not an issue", but the vulnerability was reportedly patched shortly before the breach. The IP addresses of 12,937 routers, and 3,131 AiCloud accounts were also leaked by the hackers. The U.S. Federal Trade Commission issued a complaint about the breach for the company's "failure to employ reasonable security practices has subjected consumers to substantial injury", alleging that Asus had also failed to perform basic penetration tests, allowed users to maintain a default admin password for the AiDisk feature and failed to notify users of security updates in a timely fashion. As a result, it was also deemed that Asus had misled consumers over the security and protection that its routers provided. In February 2016, Asus settled the complaint, agreeing to implement a "comprehensive security program", including independent audits every two years for the next 20 years.

In March 2019, Kaspersky Lab researchers disclosed a supply chain attack that affected the Asus Live Update software bundled on its laptops, dubbed ShadowHammer. Kaspersky stated that between June and November 2018, Asus servers had been compromised to distribute a modified version of Live Update, signed with an Asus signature, that contained a backdoor. It deployed a further payload if the device's network adapter matched an entry on an internal target list of around 600 MAC addresses. In response to ShadowHammer, Asus released a patched version of Live Update with improved security measures. Kaspersky and Symantec estimated that between 500,000 and 1 million devices were infected with the backdoor, although Asus attempted to downplay the severity of the breach by noting the extremely targeted nature of the attack. The breach did not affect the similar, identically named software associated with its motherboards.

In April 2019, ESET disclosed that a group known as BlackTech had performed targeted attacks with malware known as Plead, distributed via the updater for the Asus WebStorage service. ESET stated that the group was likely using a man-in-the-middle attack via a vulnerability in routers, in combination with the updater using an unencrypted HTTP connection.

In January 2022, Asus recalled some of its Z690 Maximus Hero motherboards due to a manufacturing flaw, where a RAM capacitor was installed backward—causing them to burn out associated MOSFETs and prevent the motherboard from detecting memory.

Following the Russian invasion of Ukraine in 2022, Asus initially refused to join a widespread withdrawal of businesses from the Russian market. In mid-March, the company did announce it was halting its operations in Russia, following a social media boycott and government pressure.

In May 2023, Asus removed an application which was used to unlock the bootloader of its ROG and Zenfone phone lineup. While previously phones like the Zenfone 9 and ROG phone 7 were previously unlockable, the access to the application was removed, while Asus Support claimed it was "under maintenance", and after user workarounds, which used Asus servers to unlock the phone without the official Asus application, the servers were subsequently shut down.While the Zenfone 10 was never bootloader unlockable, it was still advertised as such, and Asus promised consumers, that the tool would be available again at certain vague deadlines over and over, until it finally admitted, that the bootloader will not be unlockable anymore. There was a large outrage amongst enthusiasts, because it limited their usage for the phone as Asus offers only two years of software support on its phones. Many attempted to return their product or sell it. There was even a lawsuit in the UK because of the broken promise of an unlockable bootloader, in which Asus lost.

In April 2023, a post on the PCMasterRace subreddit began gaining popularity regarding the user's AMD Ryzen 7 7800X3D CPU, which had visible burning, along with the socket of the Asus motherboard. This sparked the attention of both people interested in PCs, who initially thought it was an issue with the 3D V-Cache Technology (as there had been previous user reports similar to this incident), as well as enthusiast YouTube channels such as Gamers Nexus, who ran tests to successfully recreate the burning of their CPU. They realised that the cause of the burning was due to a voltage error in the BIOS. In May, Asus responded to the incidents by releasing a Beta BIOS, which was supposed to fix the error. However, not only did the new BIOS not fix the issue; by installing it, the user voided their warranty as it was a Beta BIOS, which Asus clearly stated in the BIOS's description. Later that month, Asus responded to the public backlash by reversing course, releasing a statement informing users that it will continue to honor warranty on motherboards that have been updated to beta BIOS versions, as well as extend motherboard warranty coverage to uses of AMD EXPO, Intel XMP, and DOCP memory overclocking technologies.

In May 2024, hardware reviewer Gamers Nexus sent a ROG Ally in for warranty repair due to a faulty thumbstick. Asus denied the warranty repair, claiming that the thumbstick issue was due to "customer-induced damage". Furthermore, Asus demanded a repair fee of US$191.47 for replacement of the LCD panel and the top case because of a "small mark" on the casing, despite it not being related to the original issue that the device was sent in under warranty for. Asus also stated that it would send the device back to Gamers Nexus in a "disassembled state" if it did not pay the repair fee. Several days later, Asus honoured the warranty and performed the repair of the original issue under pressure from Gamers Nexus, as well as subsequently apologised for the poor service.

Since August 2025, over 14,000 ASUS routers have been infected by KadNap malware in order to carry out cyberattacks worldwide, according to Lumen's Black Lotus Labs. The malware evades traditional network monitoring by using a custom version of the Kademlia DHT protocol to conceal the malware's IP address. Over 60% of the infected devices are located in the US.

== See also ==
- AAEON
- ASMedia
- ASRock
- Biostar
- DFI
- Elitegroup Computer Systems
- EVGA Corporation
- Fastra II
- Gigabyte Technology
- Micro-Star International
- List of companies of Taiwan
- List of wireless router firmware projects
- PEGATRON
- Tomato (firmware)
