= Asus Memo Pad 8 =

2013 Android tablet computer by Asus

- Developer: Asus
- Manufacturer: Asus
- Type: Tablet computer
- Released: Exp. release 2013, Q4
- Operating system: Android 4.2 (Jelly Bean)
- CPU: ARM Quad-Core 1.6 GHz
- Memory: 1 GB RAM
- Storage: 16 GB
- Removable storage: microSD up to 64 GB
- Display: 8-inch (200 mm) diagonal IPS LCD capacitive touchscreen, 1280x800 pixels resolution, 189 ppi
- Sound: Stereo Speakers with SonicMaster technology
- Camera: Primary 5 MP, 2592х1944 pixels, video 720p, secondary 1.2 MP
- Connectivity: 3.5 mm headphone jack, Wi-Fi (802.11 b/g/n), Micro USB 2.0
- Online services: Google Play
- Dimensions: 212.8 mm × 127.4 mm × 9.9 mm (8.38 in × 5.02 in × 0.39 in)
- Weight: 350 g (12 oz)
- Website: eee.asus.com/en/asus-memo-pad-8

Asus Memo Pad 8 (stylised as MeMO Pad 8) is a middle-range Android tablet computer manufactured by Taiwanese corporation Asus. The tablet was announced in September 2013 and went on sale during the 2013 holiday season. The device runs on Android 4.2 (Jelly Bean) and may be upgraded to Android 5.0.1 (Lollipop).

A second generation model was announced on June 2, 2014 with the model name Asus Memo Pad 8 ME581CL which now had a 64-bit 2.3GHz Intel Atom Z3580 processor, and full HD screen with 1920×1200 pixels resolution.

== 1st gen. Specifications ==
- 8-inch IPS LCD
- 1.6 GHz quad-core processor
- 1 GB of RAM
- 5 MP rear camera

== Reception ==
Computeractive rated the tablet 4 out of 5 stars, calling it "A good mini tablet, but for most the Nexus 7 is a far better buy."
