= Nexus 7 =

Nexus 7 is a series of Android-based mini tablet computers co-developed by Google, and may refer to:

- Nexus 7 (2012), the first generation
- Nexus 7 (2013), the second generation
