= OmniROM =

Open-source mobile operating system based on Android

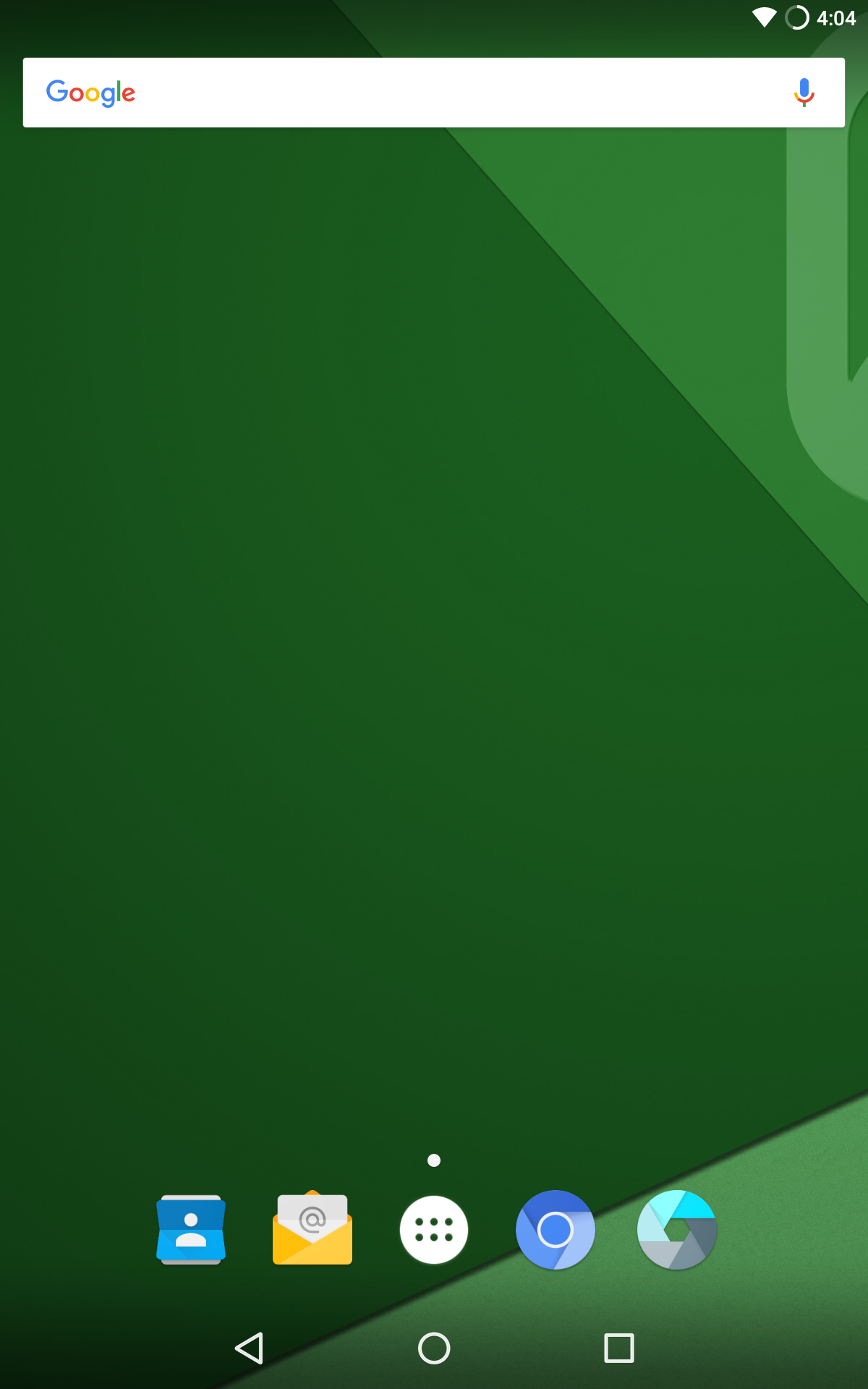
- OmniROM 6.0.1 screenshot
- Developer: OmniROM community
- Written in: C (core), C++ (some third party libraries), Java (UI)
- OS family: Android (Linux)
- Working state: Discontinued
- Source model: Open source with proprietary components
- Final release: 16.0
- Marketing target: Firmware replacement for Android mobile devices
- Package manager: APK
- Kernel type: Monolithic (Linux kernel)
- License: Free software licenses: Apache License 2.0 and GNU GPLv2
- Official website: omnirom.org

OmniROM was an open-source operating system for smartphones and tablet computers, based on the Android mobile platform. It involves a number of prominent developers from other projects.

== Development ==
OmniROM was founded in reaction to the commercialisation of ROM project CyanogenMod. At launch, the project provided custom firmware based on Android Jelly Bean, and they moved to Android KitKat shortly after its release. Their KitKat firmware included support for the Galaxy Note II, Galaxy Note, Galaxy S3, Galaxy S4, Nexus 4, Nexus 5, Nexus 7 (2012), LG Optimus G, Galaxy S2, HTC One (2013), Oppo Find 5, Sony Xperia T, Acer Iconia A500, HTC Explorer and Lenovo A6000.

OmniROM quickly gained popularity during development of Android 4.4 KitKat.

In June 2015, the project started to release nightly builds based on Android Lollipop for the Asus Transformer Pad, Asus Transformer Pad Infinity, Nexus 4, Nexus 5, Nexus 6, Nexus 7, Nexus 10, Oppo Find 7/7a, OnePlus One, Sony Xperia Z and Sony Xperia ZL.

OmniROM was one of the first custom ROMs to provide patches for the KRACK security vulnerability.

As of January 2018, Oreo builds were on a weekly update schedule.

OmniROM was one of several ROM development teams being courted by ASUS, teaming with XDA, to help seed development for ZenFone 6.

OmniROM was the first custom ROM for OnePlus 7T.

In March 2020, OmniROM began offering builds including MicroG.

On May 7th, 2026, OmniROM updated their site saying that they were discontinuing the project.

== Reception ==
In 2013, Russell Holly of Geek.com said "OmniRom is the ultimate Android tweaker ROM." A later review said OmniROM is "one of the few community-focused Android builds available today that is focused on supporting as many devices as possible while adding new features as often as possible."

In 2017, Tomek Kondrat of XDA Developers, after an interview of two developers, said OmniROM has a distinct and polished Android experience, with a history of introducing excellent features, and said "Innovation, transparency, community, and freedom are the founding ideas behind the project!"

In a 2017 detailed review on the OnePlus 5T for XDA Developers, Jeff McIntire concluded "OmniROM has some unique features" and called it "a no-frills, easy-to-configure ROM that won't bog down your phone with bloatware."

In 2018, Williams Pelegrin of Android Authority said OmniROM is one of the more popular Android ROMs available, and it contains little to no bloatware; however, he criticized OmniROM's camera app for taking pictures that are over-exposed and blurrier, particularly in low-light conditions.

OmniROM has been mentioned in books.

== See also ==
- Android Open Source Project
- List of custom Android firmware
