= Asus Transformer Pad TF103C =

The Asus Transformer Pad TF103C is a 2-in-1 detachable tablet from the Asus Transformer Pad series.

== Features ==
It has a 1.86 GHz quad-core Intel Atom Bay Trail processor, 1GB of RAM, 16GB of internal storage, and a microSD card slot, which accepts cards of capacities up to 64GB. It has a 10.1 inch display of 1280x800.

=== Docking keyboard ===
It includes a keyboard dock.

=== Software ===
It includes Asus Zen interface.

It has Android 4 by default but can optionally be upgraded to Android 5.

In January 2022, mainline Linux support was added for the TF103C.

== See also ==
- Asus Transformer Pad TF701T
- Asus Transformer Pad TF300T
