= Asus Vivo =

Set of computer products developed by Asus

- Developer: Asus
- Manufacturer: Asus
- Type: Various

Vivo is a common brand and brand fragment used in the collection of portable computer product lines developed by Asus.

== Collection ==
The collection of product lines consists of:

- Laptops: ASUS Vivobook
- All-in-Ones: Vivo AiO
- Desktops: VivoPC
- Stick PCs: VivoStick
- Mini PCs: VivoMini
- Smartwatches: VivoWatch
- Mice: VivoMouse
- Tablets: VivoTab

== ASUS Vivobook ==
Asus Vivobook
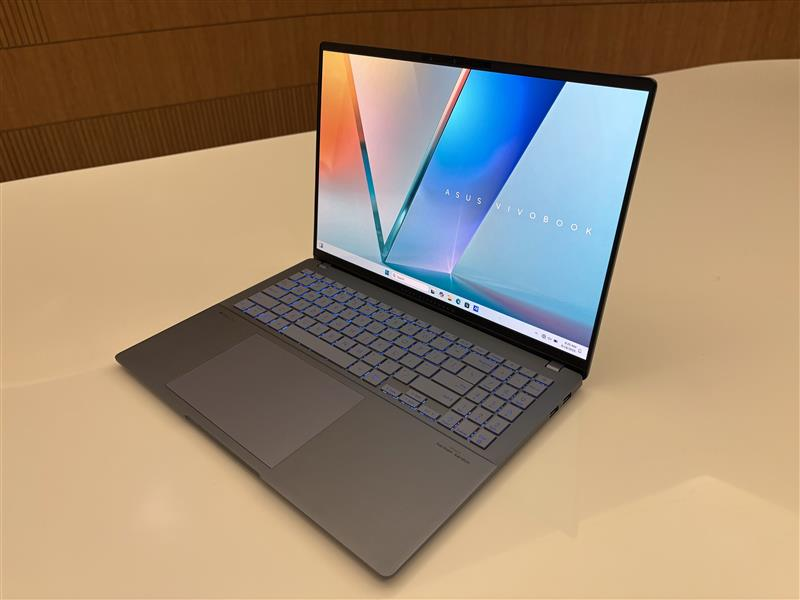
- ASUS Vivobook S16 S5606CA laptop from 2025
- Developer: Asus
- Manufacturer: Asus
- Type: Ultra-portable laptop
- Released: 2012; 14 years ago
- Lifespan: depends on device usage and operating environment
- Operating system: Windows, Linux
- CPU: AMD, Intel, Qualcomm
- Graphics: AMD, Intel, Qualcomm, Nvidia
- Marketing target: Consumer
- Related: Zenbook
- Website: www.asus.com/laptops/for-home/vivobook/, www.asus.com/content/vivobook/

ASUS Vivobook is a family of consumer‑oriented notebook computers produced by the Taiwanese electronics company ASUS. The ASUS Vivobook series is known for combining performance, portability, and affordability, making it suitable for both home and work use. The line has since expanded to include thin‑and‑light ultrabooks, creator and light gaming laptops, 2‑in‑1 convertibles and, from 2024, Qualcomm‑based Copilot+ PCs.

As of 2025 there are various ASUS Vivobook series, including the standard ASUS Vivobook for everyday use, ultraportable ASUS Vivobook S, performance-oriented ASUS Vivobook Pro with discrete graphics, convertible ASUS Vivobook Flip, as well as the low-budget ASUS Vivobook Go.

As of 2025, the ASUS Vivobook lineup includes:

- ASUS Vivobook Pro – high-performance versions with discrete graphics
- ASUS Vivobook S – ultra-portable thin-and-light laptops
- ASUS Vivobook Flip – 360° convertible 2-in-1 devices
- ASUS Vivobook Classic – standard models for everyday tasks
- ASUS Vivobook Go – budget-friendly entry-level notebooks

=== ASUS Vivobook Pro ===
Performance-oriented creator laptops pairing H-series CPUs with discrete NVIDIA GeForce RTX graphics, higher-wattage cooling (IceCool Pro) and up to color-accurate 120 Hz 3.2 K OLED panels.

=== ASUS Vivobook S ===
Ultra-portable models that emphasize thin-and-light metal chassis, long-life batteries, and premium OLED display options—many branded as Copilot+ PCs in 2025.

=== ASUS Vivobook Flip ===
2-in-1 convertibles featuring 360-degree hinges, stylus support (optional), and up to touchscreen OLEDs, enabling laptop, stand, tent, or tablet modes for flexible work and entertainment.

=== ASUS Vivobook Classic ===
The baseline lineup for everyday productivity, study, and home entertainment, offered in multiple sizes with the latest Intel Core, AMD Ryzen, or Qualcomm Snapdragon processors.

=== ASUS Vivobook Go ===
Budget notebooks aimed at students and first-time buyers, focusing on battery life, connectivity, and MIL-STD-810H construction.

Across every series, 2025 refreshes introduce on-device AI acceleration and a dedicated Copilot key.

== ASUS Vivobook History ==
2012 – Launch

ASUS entered the affordable ultrabook segment with the 11.6‑inch ASUS Vivobook S200E/X202E, pairing a multitouch screen with Windows 8 at a sub‑US$600 price point.

2016 – Convertible models

The first ASUS Vivobook Flip (TP201) introduced a 360‑degree hinge, allowing laptop, stand, tent and tablet modes.

2017 – NanoEdge bezels

The ASUS Vivobook S15 (S510) adopted ASUSs's ‘NanoEdge’ thin‑bezel display. The company touts it as the first laptop in its class to feature 7.8mm slim-bezel NanoEdge display which gives ASUS Vivobook S15 80% screen-to-body ratio.

2021 – OLED mainstream

ASUS refreshed the ASUS Vivobook range with 13–16‑inch OLED panels, Pantone‑validated color and HDR support. Some models include the ASUS Vivobook 15 OLED (K513), and ASUS Vivobook Pro 15 OLED (M3500).

2023 – Glasses‑free 3D OLED

The ASUS Vivobook Pro 16X 3D OLED debuted at CES 2023 with ASUS Spatial Vision, letting creators view stereoscopic 3D content without glasses. This model is designed for creators and offers a 3D OLED display as an optional feature, making it a unique offering from Asus.

2024 – Copilot+ PC

The ASUS Vivobook S15 (S5507) became ASUS's first ARM-based Windows laptop, using Snapdragon X Elite/Plus SoCs and on‑device NPU acceleration for Microsoft Copilot+ PC AI features.

2025 – AI‑powered refresh

ASUS introduced updated ASUS Vivobook S models with next‑gen AI capabilities. All new models adopt an updated straight-line aesthetic with a CNC-engraved lid logo, unifying the ASUS Vivobook S portfolio around on-device AI acceleration and Copilot integration.

2026 – Designed for AI experiences

The refreshed ASUS Vivobook S14 (S3407/M3407) and S16 (S3607/M3607), revealed at CES 2026, are lightweight Copilot+ PCs aimed at students, young professionals, and mobile users. Both series come with Intel Core Ultra Series 3, AMD Ryzen AI 400 series, or Qualcomm Snapdragon X series processors. They feature a metal body, a CNC-engraved logo, WUXGA OLED displays, and meet MIL-STD-810H standards.

In June 2026, at Computex, ASUS announced four Vivobook models based on Qualcomm: the Vivobook S14 (S5408), the S16 (S5608), the convertible Vivobook S14 Flip (TP5408), and the S16 Flip (TP5608). These models feature 360-degree hinges and support for the ASUS Pen 3.0 stylus.

All four are Copilot+ PCs powered by the eight-core Snapdragon X processor. They offer OLED display options and the manufacturer claims a battery life of over 25 hours.

Vivobook S

Model	Display	Processor	Graphics	Memory	Storage	Battery	Weight	Dimensions (WxDxH)	Peripheral connections	Wireless	Operating system
S14 (S3407AA)	14.0-inch, WUXGA (1920x1200)OLED 16:10 aspect ratio	Intel Core Ultra 7 Processor355 2.3 GHz; Intel NPU up to 49TOPS Intel Core Ultra 5 Processor325 2.1 GHz; Intel NPU up to 47TOPS	Intel Graphics	16GB DDR5 on board 16GB DDR5 SO-DIMM MaxTotal system memory upto:32GB 16GB DDR5 on board Max Total system memory upto:32GB	1TB M.2 NVMe PCIe 4.0 SSD 512GB M.2 NVMe PCIe 4.0 SSD	70WHrs, 4S1P, 4-cell Li-ion	1.40 kg	31.52 x 22.34 x 1.59 ~ 1.79 cm	2x USB 3.2 Gen 1 Type-C with support for display/power delivery 2x USB 3.2 Gen 1 Type-A, 1x 3.5mm Combo Audio Jack1x HDMI 2.1TMDS	Wi-Fi 6 2*2+Bluetooth 5.4Wireless Card	Windows 11 Pro Windows 11 Home ASUS recommends Windows 11 Pro for business
S14 (M3407GA)	14.0-inch, WUXGA (1920x1200)OLED 16:10 aspect ratio	AMD Ryzen AI 7 445 Processor 2.0 GHz; AMD XDNA NPU up to 50TOPS	AMD Radeon Graphics	16GB DDR5 on board 16GB DDR5 SO-DIMM MaxTotal system memory upto:32GB 16GB DDR5 on board Max Total system memory upto:32GB	1TB M.2 NVMe PCIe 4.0 SSD 512GB M.2 NVMe PCIe 4.0 SSD	70WHrs, 4S1P, 4-cell Li-ion	1.40 kg	31.52 x 22.34 x 1.59 ~ 1.79 cm	2x USB 3.2 Gen 1 Type-C with support for display/power delivery 2x USB 3.2 Gen 1 Type-A, 1x 3.5mm Combo Audio Jack1x HDMI 2.1TMDS	Wi-Fi 6 2*2+Bluetooth 5.4Wireless Card	Windows 11 Pro Windows 11 Home ASUS recommends Windows 11 Pro for business
S14 (S5408QA)	Up to 14.0-inch, WUXGA (1920 x 1200) OLED 16:10 aspect ratio	Snapdragon X X1 26 101 Processor (30MB Cache, up to 2.97GHz, 8 cores, 8 Threads)	Qualcomm Adreno GPU	16GB LPDDR5X on board Max Total system memory up to:16GB	512GB M.2 NVMe PCIe 4.0 SSD 256GB M.2 NVMe PCIe SSD	50WHrs, 3S1P, 3-cell Li-ion	1.28 kg	31.16 x 22.19 x 1.49 ~ 1.69 cm	2x USB 3.2 Gen 2 Type-C with support for display / power delivery 2x USB 3.2 Gen 1 Type-A , 1x 3.5mm Combo Audio Jack 1x micro HDMI 2.1 TMDS	Wi-Fi 6E 2*2 + Bluetooth 5.3 Wireless Card	Windows 11 Home - ASUS recommends Windows 11 Pro for business
S16 (S3607NA)	16.0-inch, WUXGA (1920x1200)OLED 16:10 aspect ratio	SnapdragonX2 Elite (18-core) X2E88100; Qualcomm Hexagon NPU up to 80TOPS	Qualcomm Adreno GPU	32GB LPDDR5X on board Max Total system memory up to:32GB 16GB LPDDR5X on board Max Total system memory up to:16GB	1TB M.2 NVMe PCIe 4.0 SSD 512GB M.2 NVMe PCIe 4.0 SSD	70WHrs, 4S1P, 4-cell Li-ion	1.80 kg 1.68 kg	35.70 x 25.07 x 1.59 ~ 1.79 cm	2x USB 4.0 Gen 3 Type-C with support for display / power delivery 1x USB 3.2 Gen 2 Type-A1x USB 3.2 Gen 1 Type-A, 1x 3.5mm Combo Audio Jack1x HDMI 2.1 TMDS	Wi-Fi 7 2*2 +Bluetooth 5.4 Wireless Card	Windows 11 Pro Windows 11 Home ASUS recommends Windows 11 Pro for business
S16 (S3607AA)	16.0-inch, WUXGA (1920x1200)OLED 16:10 aspect ratio	Intel Core Ultra 9 Processor 386H 2.1 GHz; Intel NPU up to 50TOPS Intel Core Ultra 7 Processor 355 2.3 GHz; Intel NPU up to 49TOPS Intel Core Ultra 5 Processor 325 2.1 GHz; Intel NPU up to 47TOPS	Intel Graphics	16GB DDR5 on board 16GB DDR5 SO-DIMM MaxTotal system memory upto:32GB 16GB DDR5 on board Max Total system memory upto:32GB	1TB M.2 NVMe PCIe 4.0 SSD 512GB M.2 NVMe PCIe 4.0 SSD	70WHrs, 4S1P, 4-cell Li-ion	1.70 kg	35.70 x 25.07 x 1.59 ~ 1.79 cm	2x USB 3.2 Gen 1 Type-C with support for display/power delivery 2x USB 3.2 Gen 1 Type-A, 1x 3.5mm Combo Audio Jack1x HDMI 2.1TMDS	Wi-Fi 6 2*2+Bluetooth 5.4Wireless Card	Windows 11 Pro Windows 11 Home ASUS recommends Windows 11 Pro for business
S16 (M3607GA)	16.0-inch, FHD (1920 x 1200) OLED 16:10 aspect ratio	AMD Ryzen AI 9 465 Processor 2.0 GHz; AMD XDNA NPU up to 50TOPS AMD Ryzen AI 7 445 Processor 2.0 GHz; AMD XDNA NPU up to 50TOPS AMD Ryzen AI 5 430 Processor 2.0 GHz; AMD XDNA NPU up to 50TOPS	AMD Radeon Graphics	16GB DDR5 on board 16GB DDR5 SO-DIMM MaxTotal system memory upto:32GB 16GB DDR5 on board Max Total system memory upto:32GB	1TB M.2 NVMe PCIe 4.0 SSD 512GB M.2 NVMe PCIe 4.0 SSD	70WHrs, 4S1P, 4-cell Li-ion	1.70 kg	35.70 x 25.06 x 1.59 ~ 1.79 cm	2x USB 3.2 Gen 1 Type-C with support for display/power delivery 2x USB 3.2 Gen 1 Type-A, 1x 3.5mm Combo Audio Jack1x HDMI 2.1TMDS	Wi-Fi 6 2*2+Bluetooth 5.4Wireless Card	Windows 11 Pro Windows 11 Home ASUS recommends Windows 11 Pro for business
S16 (S5608QA)	Up to 16.0-inch, WUXGA (1920 x 1200) OLED 16:10 aspect ratio	Snapdragon X X1 26 101 Processor (30MB Cache, up to 2.97GHz, 8 cores, 8 Threads)	Qualcomm Adreno GPU	16GB LPDDR5X on board Max Total system memory up to:16GB	512GB M.2 NVMe PCIe 4.0 SSD 256GB M.2 NVMe PCIe SSD	50WHrs, 3S1P, 3-cell Li-ion	1.60 kg	35.42 x 24.87 x 1.49 ~ 1.69 cm	2x USB 3.2 Gen 2 Type-C with support for display / power delivery 2x USB 3.2 Gen 1 Type-A, 1x 3.5mm Combo Audio Jack 1x micro HDMI 2.1 TMDS	Wi-Fi 6E 2*2 + Bluetooth® 5.3 Wireless Card	Windows 11 Home - ASUS recommends Windows 11 Pro for business

Vivobook Flip

Model	Display	Processor	Graphics	Memory	Storage	Battery	Weight	Dimensions (WxDxH)	Peripheral connections	Wireless	Operating system
S14 Flip (TP5408QA)	Up to 14.0-inch, 2K OLED touchscreen	Snapdragon X X1 26 100 Processor (30MB Cache, up to 2.97GHz, 8 cores, 8 Threads)	Qualcomm Adreno GPU	16GB LPDDR5X on board Max Total system memory up to:16GB	512GB M.2 NVMe PCIe 4.0 SSD 256GB M.2 NVMe PCIe SSD	50WHrs, 3S1P, 3-cell Li-ion	1.39 kg	31.16 x 22.19 x 1.49 ~ 1.69 cm	2x USB 3.2 Gen 2 Type-C with support for display / power delivery 2x USB 3.2 Gen 1 Type-A, 1x 3.5mm Combo Audio Jack 1x HDMI 2.1 TMDS	Wi-Fi 6E 2*2 + Bluetooth 5.3 Wireless Card	Windows 11 Pro Windows 11 Home - ASUS recommends Windows 11 Pro for business
S16 Flip (TP5608QA)	Up to 16.0-inch, 2K OLED touchscreen	Snapdragon X X1 26 100 Processor (30MB Cache, up to 2.97GHz, 8 cores, 8 Threads)	Qualcomm Adreno GPU	16GB LPDDR5X on board Max Total system memory up to:16GB	512GB M.2 NVMe PCIe 4.0 SSD 256GB M.2 NVMe PCIe SSD	50WHrs, 3S1P, 3-cell Li-ion	1.68 kg	35.40 x 24.43 x 1.49 ~ 1.73 cm	2x USB 3.2 Gen 2 Type-C with support for display / power delivery 2x USB 3.2 Gen 1 Type-A, 1x Headphone/Headset 1x HDMI 2.1 TMDS	Wi-Fi 6E 2*2 + Bluetooth® 5.3 Wireless Card	Windows 11 Pro Windows 11 Home - ASUS recommends Windows 11 Pro for business

== ASUS Vivobook Design ==
ASUS Vivobook laptops generally feature a minimalist and modern design, often with a focus on clean lines, premium materials, and subtle color palettes. Many models incorporate features like a CNC-engraved logo, a tapered unibody design, and a choice of stylish colors like Neutral Black, Mist Blue, Cool Silver, and more. Minimalist and Modern:

Asus Vivobooks often prioritize a clean, uncluttered aesthetic, appealing to users who value a sleek and sophisticated look.

Materials:

Many models utilize metal bodies and top covers, contributing to a sturdy and premium feel.

Subtle Color Options:

Color choices are often in the realm of neutral tones like neutral black, cool silver, mist blue, rose gold, platinum gold, and matte gray.

CNC Engravin:

Some models adds a refined CNC-engraved logo on the top lid, adding a touch of detail and sophistication.

Tapered Unibody Design:

The unibody construction enhances the laptop's overall solidity and stability.

180-Degree Hinge:

The hinge design allows the laptop to lay flat, useful for collaboration or presentations.

Larger Touchpad:

Many models have an enlarged touchpad with smart gestures for intuitive navigation.

Optional RGB Keyboard Backlighting:

Some Asus Vivobooks offer a single-zone RGB keyboard backlight for customization.

== ASUS Vivobook Features & Technology ==
OLED & NanoEdge displays Most 2021-onward ASUS Vivobook laptops adopt ASUS Lumina OLED panels with 100% DCI-P3 gamut, 0.2 ms response and TÜV Rheinland low-blue-light certification, framed by the brand's NanoEdge slim bezels.

Spatial Vision 3D OLED

The ASUS Vivobook Pro 16X 3D OLED debuts glasses-free autostereoscopic 3D at 3.2 K / 120 Hz, marketed as the world's first 3D OLED laptop display.

On-device AI & Copilot+ PCs

2024-25 refreshes introduce Snapdragon X Elite/Plus, AMD Ryzen AI 300 and Intel Core Ultra Series 2 chips delivering up to 50 TOPS NPUs and Microsoft's Copilot+ PC features such as Recall, Live Captions and Cocreator.

IceCool / IceCool Pro thermal design

Creator-class ASUS Vivobook Pro models employ dual-fan IceCool Pro cooling and a hardware MUX switch to sustain high CPU-GPU clocks while letting users toggle between hybrid and discrete-GPU modes.

Audio & connectivity

The ASUS Vivobook S-series models pair Harman/Kardon-tuned speakers with Dolby Atmos and include Thunderbolt 4/USB 4, HDMI 2.1 and microSD ports even on sub-1.7 kg chassis.

Privacy & security

2025 units add a Full-HD IR webcam with privacy shutter and Microsoft Pluton security processor.

== Vivo AiO ==
The Vivo AiO is a lineup of all-in-one desktop computers.

List of Vivo Aio products

- Vivo AiO V200 (V200IB)
- Vivo AiO V220 (V220IC, V220IB, V220IA)
- Vivo AiO V221 (V221ID, V221IC)
- Vivo AiO V222 (V222 GB, V222UA, V222GA, V222UB)
- Vivo Ai0 V230 (V230IC)
- Vivo Ai0 V241 (V241IC)
- Vivo AiO V272 (V272UN, V272UA)

== VivoPC ==
Some of Asus' desktop products have been rebadged and marketed as VivoPC's

== VivoStick ==
The VivoStick is a single-board computer. Its model number is: TS10.

== VivoMini ==
The VivoMini is a lineup of small form factor computer

List of VivoMini products

- VivoMini UN45
- VivoMini UN62
- VivoMini UN65 (UN65H, UN65U)
- VivoMini UN68U
- VivoMini VC65
- VivoMini VC65R
- VivoMini VC66
- VivoMini VC66R
- VivoMini VC68V
- VivoMini VM45
- VivoMini VM65

== VivoWatch ==
The Asus VivoWatch has a built-in heart rate sensor and IP67 water resistance rating. There is also the VivoWatch BP which has built-in blood pressure measurement.

=== Reception ===
Engadget gave a rating of 79% in their review of the VivoWatch which mentioned the positives being "Elegant design, Highly visible heart rate zone LED, Automatic sleep tracking, Great battery life and Continuous heart rate monitoring" while the cons being "Doesn't track distance, No app notifications, App still needs some polish and Can't export data to third-party apps".

TechRadar gave the VivoWatch a three-star rating in their review which mentioned the positives being "Easy to read, always on screen, 10 days of battery life and Reasonably priced" while the cons being "Basic companion app, Unnecessary happiness monitor and Doesn't stand out from the crowd".

Wareable gave a three-star rating for the VivoWatch in their review stating which mentioned the positives being "Good price, Excellent battery life and Useful heart rate LED" while the cons being "No notifications, No distance/GPS/sports and App needs work".

== VivoTab ==
Further Information: Asus VivoTab

VivoTab is a series of Microsoft Windows hybrid tablet computers designed by Asus. The name is derived from the Latin word "to live" and, along with Asus's Transformer series of convertible devices running Windows, is a primary competitor to the Microsoft Surface.

The family is made up of the VivoTab, VivoTab RT, VivoTab RT 3G, VivoTab RT LTE, VivoTab Smart, and later on the VivoTab Note 8. All the tablets come with Windows 8 (or Windows 8.1 on the Note 8), a 3-year subscription to Asus WebStorage. They have high definition screens to advertise ultra-portability and extended battery life, and the ability of detachable tablets. VivoTab RT has an MSRP of US$599 (32 GB) and $699 (64 GB)

== VivoMouse ==
There are two Asus VivoMouse, the VivoMouse WT710 and VivoMouse Metallic Edition WT720. The VivoMouse can be used as a standard desktop mouse, touchpad which supports gestures on Windows or wireless remote.

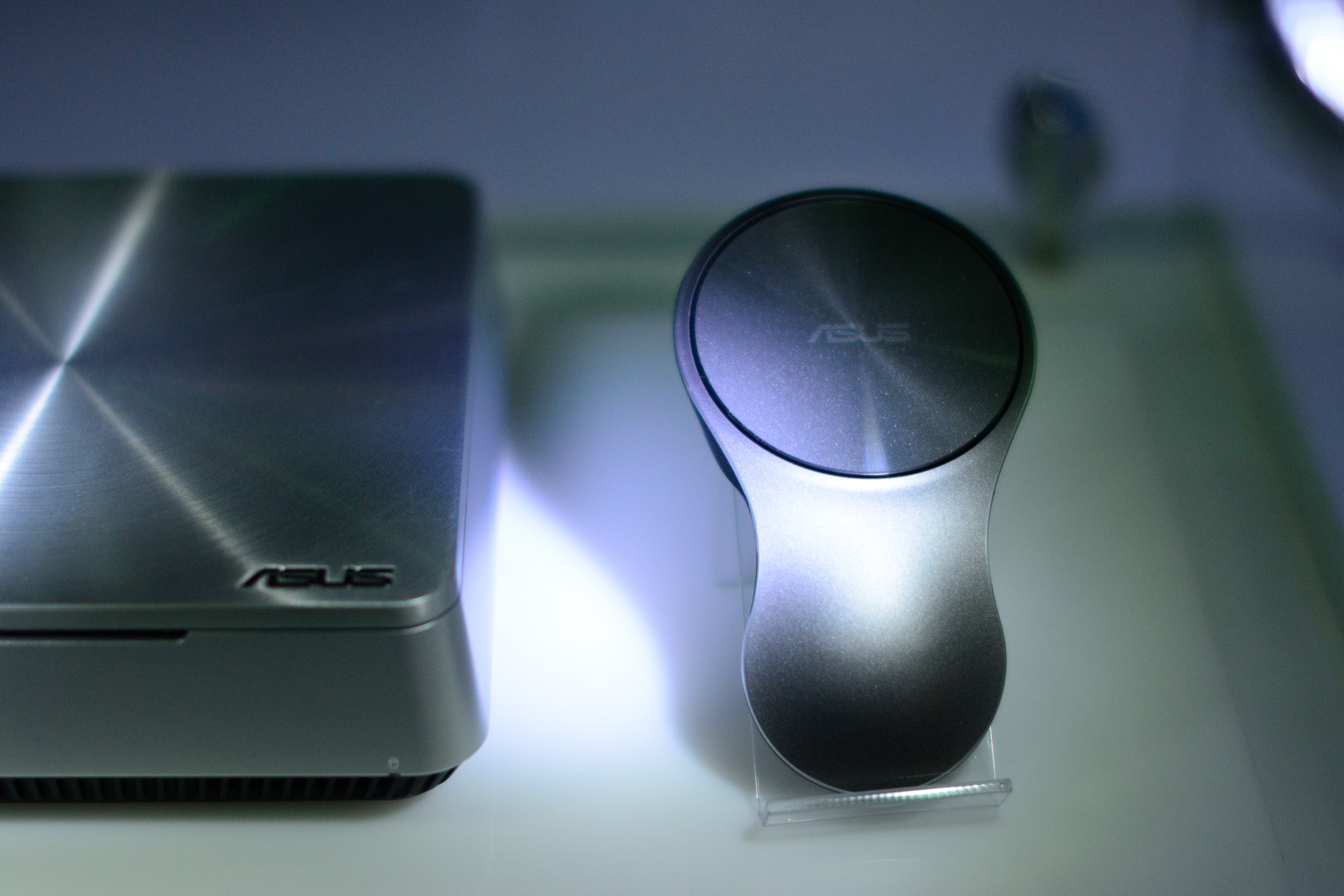
Asus VivoMouse

=== Specifications ===
Model	VivoMouse WT710	VivoMouse Metallic Edition WT720
Connectivity Technology	Wireless	
Wireless Technology	RF 2.4 GHz	
Tracking	Optical	
Mouse Dimensions (mm)	135 × 78 × 26	
Dongle Dimensions (mm)	19 × 14 × 6	
Weight (gram)	115	

== Reviews and awards ==
ASUS Vivobook laptops have consistently been recognized for their design, innovation, and user experience. Notably, the ASUS Vivobook S14, S15, and S16 models received the prestigious iF Design Award in 2025, highlighting their aesthetics and functionality. In the same year, ASUS secured 41 Red Dot Design Awards, with several ASUS Vivobook models—such as the ASUS Vivobook 14/16 Flip, ASUS Vivobook Classic Series, and V16—earning accolades for their design.

These awards underscore ASUS's commitment to delivering laptops that combine style, performance, and user-centric features, solidifying the ASUS Vivobook series as a leader in the mid-range and premium laptop market.

- Reviewing the 16-inch 2025 refresh, IT Pro described the ASUS Vivobook S16 (S5606) as “an outstanding lightweight OLED laptop” that blends “excellent battery life with a premium metal build at a mid-range price.”
- TechRadar called the 2024 ASUS Vivobook S15 (S5507) “an absolutely exceptional piece of kit that rivals premium ultrabooks for design,” highlighting its “outstanding OLED display” and “phenomenal laptop experience with outstanding battery life.” However, they noted that “Copilot provides some punch, but AI tools still need work to make this a real titan,” indicating Microso*6 ft's Copilot software “still feels half-baked.”
- LaptopMedia highlighted the ASUS Vivobook Pro 15 (N6506) for its “killer 120Hz OLED display and efficient cooling,” noting it is suitable for content creation and gaming. They also mentioned “limited upgradeability” as a drawback.
- T3 noted that the ASUS Vivobook S15 (S5507) was the first laptop to feature Qualcomm's new Snapdragon X Plus 8-core processor, blending performance and portability in a 1.42 kg, 14.7 mm chassis. It praised the “3K OLED panel” with a “120Hz refresh rate” and highlighted the inclusion of USB4, HDMI, and microSD ports, along with Wi-Fi 7 connectivity.
- Laptop Mag praised the ASUS Vivobook 16 Flip (TP3607) as a standout 2‑in‑1 convertible, highlighting its 16‑inch 120 Hz OLED touchscreen, strong performance powered by the Intel Core Ultra 7 258V and Intel Arc 140V graphics, 32 GB soldered memory, 1 TB SSD, and excellent battery life of 13 hours 47 minutes. While noting minor drawbacks like a “mushy keyboard,” “inconsistent bottom-firing speakers,” and “sub‑par webcam,” the review concluded it's a “compelling convertible” that “stands out” in its category.
- Windows Central reported that ASUS returned to ARM-based designs with refreshed Copilot+ ASUS Vivobook models, including the ASUS Vivobook S 15 (S5507), ASUS Vivobook Flip 14 (TP3407), and ASUS Vivobook Flip 16 (TP3607). The article notes they promise “long battery life and a Neural Processing Unit (NPU) with 45 TOPS of power for localized AI tasks,” and that ASUS claims up to a 44% performance boost and up to 19.8 hours of battery runtime.
