= Acer Iconia Tab A500 =

Tablet manufactured by Acer Inc.

Iconia Tab A500
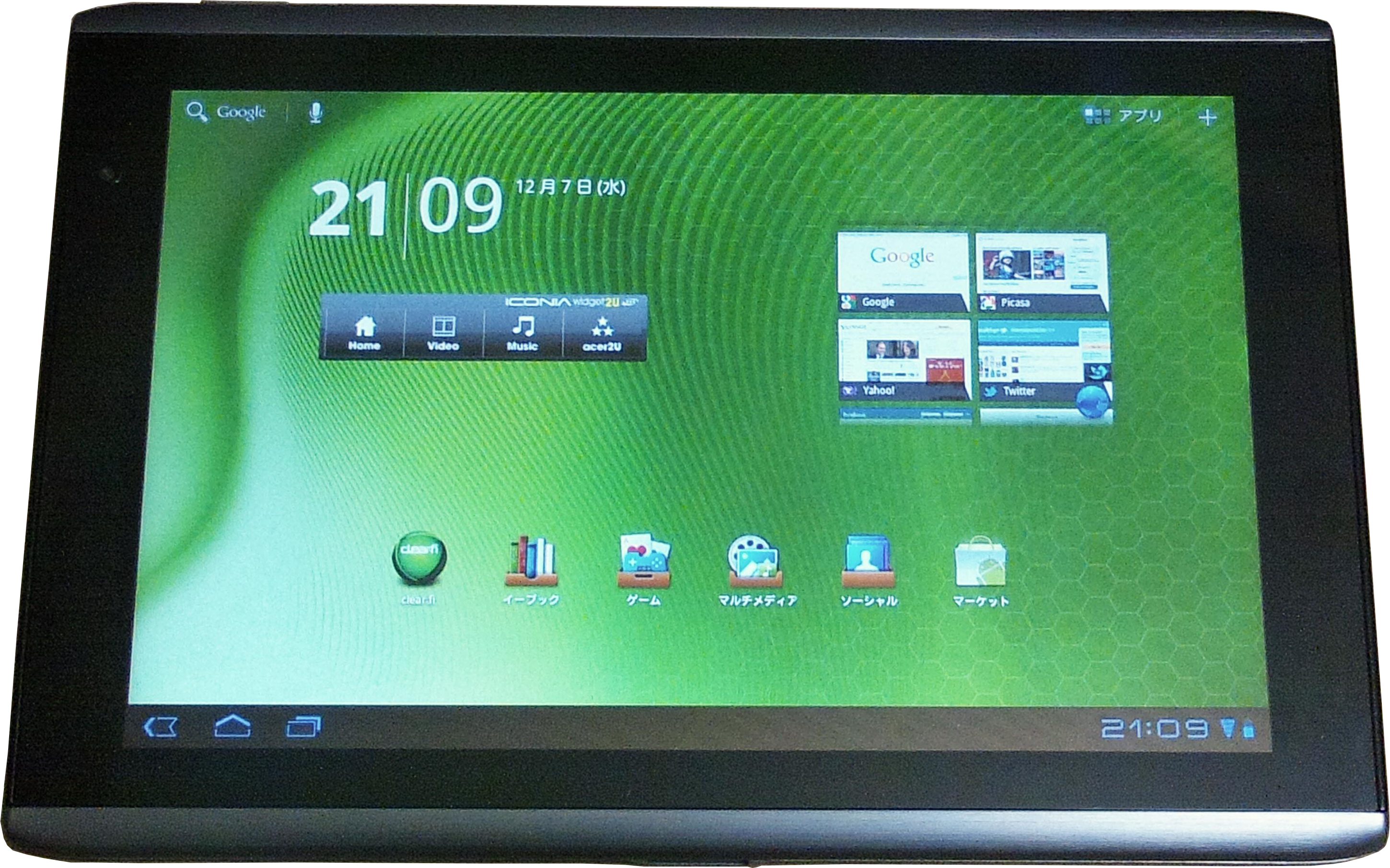
- Iconia A500 showing its home screen
- Developer: Acer Inc.
- Type: Tablet computer
- Released: U.S.: 24 April 2011
- Units sold: 1 million (As of second quarter 2011)
- Operating system: Android Honeycomb, although Ice Cream Sandwich is now available. 4.2 & 4.3 (Jelly Bean), 4.4 (KitKat) and 5.1 (Lollipop) are supported by unofficial 3rd-party updates.
- CPU: 1 GHz Nvidia Tegra 250
- Memory: 1024 MB RAM
- Storage: 8, 16 and 32 GB flash memory. 64GB in some countries.
- Display: 1280 × 800 px10.1 in (26 cm) diagonal, LED-backlit
- Graphics: ULP GeForce 333 MHz
- Sound: Bluetooth, speaker, microphone, headset jack. There is also Dolby Mobile onboard
- Input: Multi-touch screen, headset controls, proximity, ambient light sensors, 3-axis accelerometer, digital compass and 3-axis gyro, GPS
- Camera: 2MP front-facing and 5MP rear-facing
- Connectivity: Wi-Fi (802.11 a/b/g/n (only 2.4 GHz)); Bluetooth 2.1 + EDR; USB 2.0; Micro-USB 2.0; Micro HDMI; Dock port
- Power: Built-in rechargeable 3260mah lithium-ion polymer battery, 8hr life
- Dimensions: 10.24 in (260 mm) (h); 6.97 in (177 mm) (w).52 in (13 mm) (d)
- Weight: 25.75 oz (730 g)

The Acer Iconia A500 is a tablet computer designed, developed and marketed by Acer Inc. The A500 launched with the Android Honeycomb operating system which is now upgradable to Ice Cream Sandwich 4.0.3 (since April 2012). The tablet is also sold in almost identical form as the Packard Bell Liberty Tab G100.

== Hardware ==
This tablet has a 5 MP and a 2 MP front camera for video calling. It is powered by 1 GHz Nvidia Tegra 250 processor and 1024 MB DDR2 RAM. The A500 is sold with 64 GB flash in certain countries although both 16 GB and 32 GB models are available.

The A500 was one of the first Android tablets to feature a full size USB port directly in the tablet, opposed to the ASUS Eee Pad Transformer that provides only one with the accessory keyboard dock. Since the latest version of Android Honeycomb (3.2) The device supports a much larger variety of USB devices including NTFS and linux partitions. Previously, the number of compatible devices was very limited, with only USB mice, keyboard and FAT32 formatted drives (NTFS and other file-systems were available through apps that depend upon rooting) being able to be used with the tablet.

== Software ==
The tablet was offered with Android 3.0 upon release. Android 3.1 and 3.2 was made available later through over the air updates and Android 4.0.3 (Ice Cream Sandwich) update has since been made available (April 2012).

Root was possible using an app developed by sc2k and published at xda-developers. up to Android version 3.1 after which the vulnerability used was patched up by Acer, although by downgrading to one of these susceptible version of Android one can install ClockworkMod Recovery before installing a pre-rooted version of 3.2.1 or indeed Ice Cream Sandwich.

Some leaks of Android 4.0.3 from Acer were published on xda-developers over a series of months leading up to its April 2012 release.

As of now, there are a few ROMs that are built based on the leaks and many of them were updated numerous times to be based on the newer releases as they came through from Acer. Many of these, such as the popular 'Flexreaper' ROM are now based on actual OTA releases.

In April 2012 Acer released Ice Cream Sandwich 4.0.3 which in some regions is identical to the 1.031.00 leak from March This ICS Release is susceptible to Rooting solutions that date back to the original leaks – all of which utilise the 'mempodroid' exploit by saurik. Although the previous 'itsmagic' trick, also by sc2k, no longer works with the updated bootloader, one can utilise the device's APX Mode to install modified images, provided one is able to obtain their unique UID from the device and hence calculate their Secure Boot Key. As the installation of a patched bootloader permits the loading of any unsigned image, one can root the tablet using a combination of a patched bootloader and ClockworkMod Recovery, thus removing the necessity for a userland exploit.

Developers on the TegraOwners forum have produced community maintained and developed builds of later Android releases, which have not been approved nor endorsed by Acer. These releases include builds based on:

- Android 4.0.4 (Ice Cream Sandwich) based on CyanogenMod 9
- Android 4.1.2 (Jelly Bean) based on CM10
- Android 4.2.1 (Jelly Bean) based on CM10.1
- Android 4.3.1 (Jelly Bean) based on CM10.2
- Android 4.4.4 (KitKat) based on OmniROM 4.4
- Android 5.1.1 (Lollipop) based on OmniROM 5.1 or CM12.1

Ubuntu Linux also was made to work in the Acer Iconia A500 by installing the kernel in place of the recovery image. The root file-system for the Ubuntu installation must be placed in a SD card. Other sources also state that it is possible to run Ubuntu 10.10 by using chroot and VNC for a Linux GUI.

In 2019, Android 10 Go was released. Some YouTubers post videos about how to dual boot a tablet like the Acer Iconia A500. They stated that Android Go is really lightweight and free up a significant amount of space for installing Windows 10.
