= Asus Eee Pad Transformer TF201 =

2-in-1 detachable tablet by Asus

Asus Eee Pad Transformer Prime
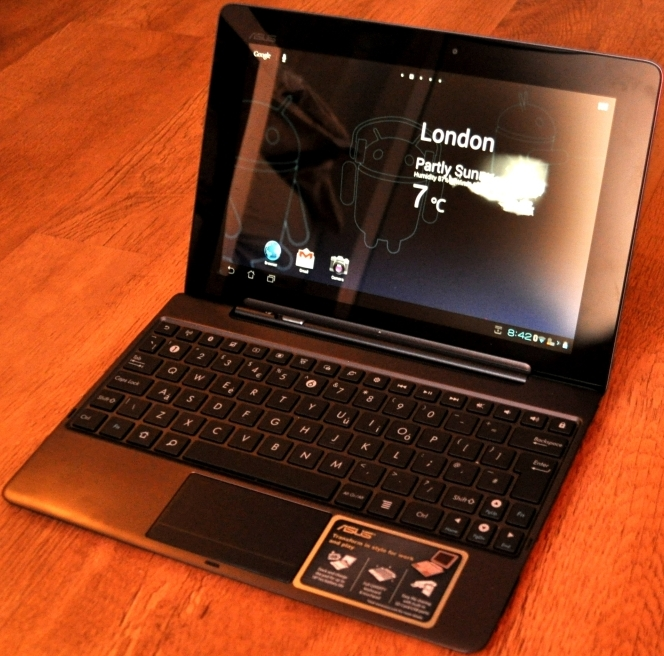
- Asus Eee Pad Transformer Prime
- Developer: Asus
- Type: Tablet, media player, PC
- Released: 1 December 2011 (Taiwan); 12 December 2011 (United States online)
- Operating system: Android 4.1.1
- CPU: 1.3 GHz quad-core Nvidia Tegra 3 T30
- Memory: 1 GB
- Storage: Flash memory 32 or 64 GB and microSD slot
- Display: 10.1" LED Backlit screen with Super IPS+ (1280 x 800) 10 finger multi-touch Gorilla Glass
- Graphics: GeForce ULP
- Sound: monaural speaker, microphone, headset jack
- Input: 10 finger Multi-touch screen; dock keyboard + touchpad; Compass; GPS receiver (removed from spec on US website - see hardware issue); Ambient light sensors; 3-axis accelerometer-gyroscope
- Camera: Back: 8 MP autofocus 1080p video recording Front: 1.9 MP for video calls
- Connectivity: Bluetooth 2.1; micro HDMI; Dock 1x USB 2.0; DLNA; Wi-Fi 802.11b/g/n
- Dimensions: Tablet; 263 mm (10.4 in) H 180.8 mm (7.12 in) W 8.3 mm (0.33 in); Keyboard; 263 mm (10.4 in) H 180.8 mm (7.12 in) W 10.4 mm (0.41 in)
- Weight: Tablet: 586 g (20.7 oz); Keyboard: 537 g (18.9 oz)
- Predecessor: Asus Eee Pad Transformer
- Successor: Asus Transformer Pad Infinity
- Related: Asus Transformer Pad TF300T
- Website: eee.asus.com/eeepad/transformer-prime

The Asus Eee Pad Transformer TF201 or Asus Eee Pad Transformer Prime is a 2-in-1 detachable tablet from the Asus Transformer Pad series. It is the world's first Android tablet computer with a quad-core processor, and a successor to the dual-core Asus Eee Pad Transformer. It runs Android 4.1. The Transformer Prime was announced by Asus on 9 November 2011. It was released in Taiwan on 1 December 2011, and in Canada and the United States during the week of 19 December 2011.

== Features ==
The Eee Pad Transformer Prime is a tablet computer with a 10.1" IPS+ multi-touch screen with a resolution of 1280x800 and an Nvidia Tegra 3 system-on-a-chip (SoC). It has an 802.11b/g/n Wi-Fi module and a microSD card reader.

The optional docking keyboard features full QWERTY keys, touchpad, one USB 2.0 port and one Secure Digital (SD) card reader as well as an additional battery that increases overall battery life from 12 to 18 hours. There is also a sleeve which protects the tablet when not in use. This has similarities with the iPad 2 Smart Cover, but folds in an origami like fashion.

== Software ==
The Transformer Prime shipped with Android 3.2 Honeycomb. Android 4.0.3 Ice Cream Sandwich update was released on 11 January 2012 for the Transformer Prime. It was then updated to Android 4.1.2 Jelly Bean on 27 September 2012.

== Reception ==
The tablet has been noted for its graphics performance in games optimized for the Tegra 3, with the water in Riptide GP prompting a description of "awesome". By contrast, file transfer speeds for writing were one of the slowest in tablets tested. A review unit was rooted in December 2011. Users of the device intending to install a custom ROM themselves were disappointed in January 2012 to discover a locked and encrypted bootloader. The manufacturer promptly announced work on a tool to unlock the bootloader, the use of which will void the warranty and preclude use of DRM content purchased via services such as Google Videos. In a comparison with the original Transformer by the Android Police blog, the Prime was preferred. Two "minor" downsides were quoted: the speakers and the loss of a USB port.

=== Hasbro lawsuit ===
On 22 December 2011, toy maker Hasbro filed a lawsuit against Asus for trademark violation. Hasbro requested that Asus change the name of the Prime, claiming that the name "Transformer Prime" is using its Transformers franchise to sell tablets. Failing the name change, they are requesting that Asus not be allowed to release the Prime, and that they pay punitive damages. Asus said that the Prime's rollout would not be affected. However, a US judge denied Hasbro's request to block sales late May 2012, citing that "the tablets actually do transform".

=== GPS and WiFi problems ===
On 30 December 2011, news started to emerge that hardware problems exist in the Transformer Prime with its GPS and WiFi ability. It was suggested in user forums that the problem is a result of the spun aluminium back panel effectively blocking GPS signals, poorly contacting Pogo pin connectors causing further signal loss, and in at least some units, faulty printed circuit boards. The former issue was later corroborated by Asus themselves in a response letter discussing the issue. Asus responded by saying "The ASUS Transformer Prime is made from a metallic unibody design, so the material may affect the performance of the GPS when receiving signals from satellites" they went on to say "this product is not a professional GPS device". Most notably, they then proceeded to remove the GPS ability from the official list of Transformer Prime specs on their US website. ASUS now offers a free GPS dongle shipped to all customers who purchased the Transformer Prime, saying it "may help improve signal reception and optimize the user experience" available until 31 July 2012 (PST).

== Third generation model ==
At CES 2012, the manufacturer announced the successor to the Transformer Prime, the Asus Transformer Pad Infinity (previously known as the TF700T), less than a month after the original product launch, to launch Q2 2012. This new model includes a Tegra 3 T33 processor clocked at 1.6 GHz (as opposed to the Prime's T30), and an upgraded 1,920×1,200-pixel-resolution screen, more than doubling the resolution of the prior model. The display was upgraded to a Super IPS+ panel for ultra bright outdoor readability with 178° wide viewing angles. In response to the signal problems, it includes a new back-panel design with the upper part made of plastic to enhance Wi-Fi, Bluetooth, and GPS performance. The front camera was boosted from 1.2 megapixels to 2 megapixels. It has improved graphics performance with a 12-core GPU.

== See also ==
- Android version history
- Comparison of tablet computers
