= Asus VivoTab =

Series of tablet computers by Asus

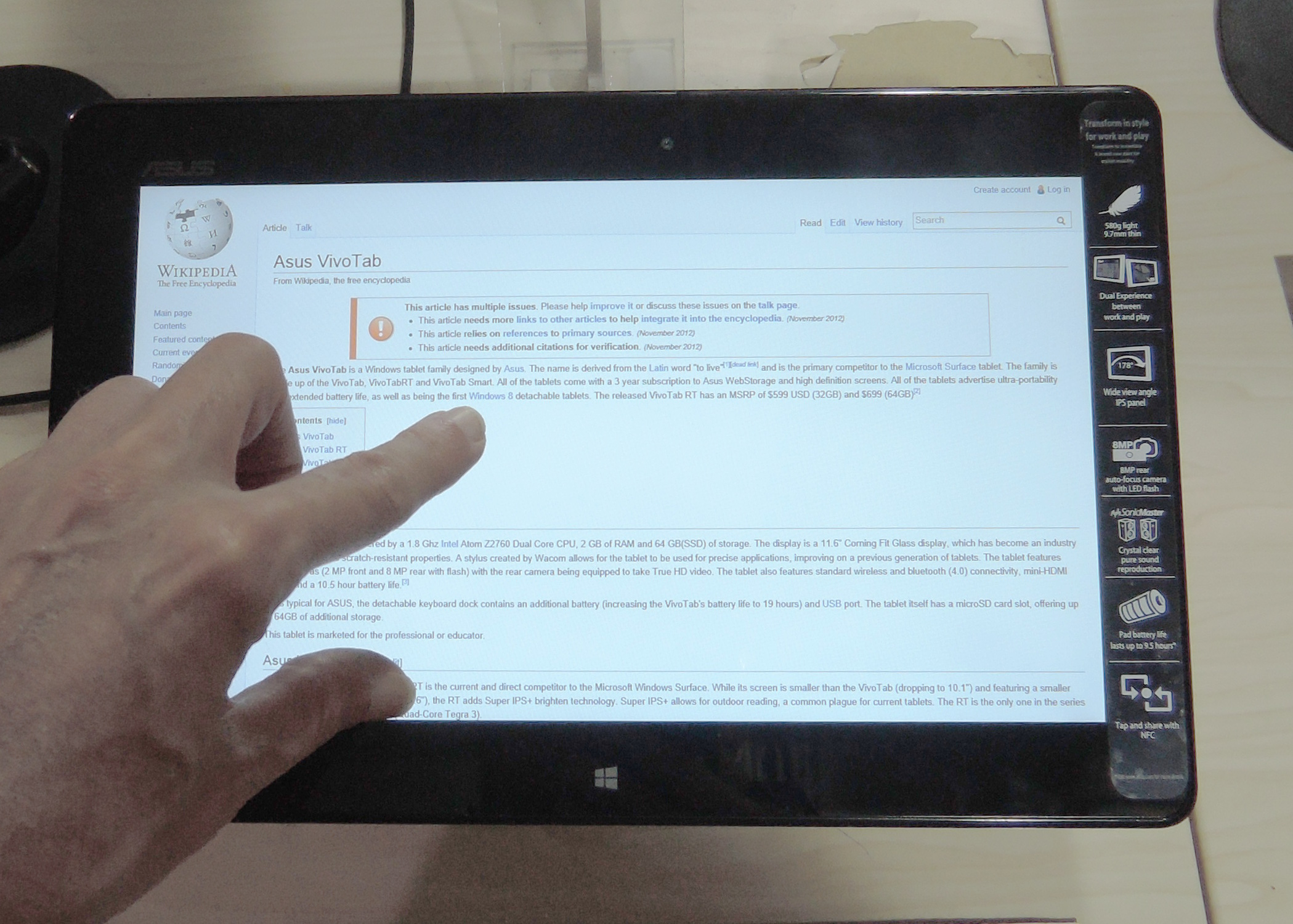
ASUS VivoTab 11.6" (ME400)

VivoTab is a series of Microsoft Windows hybrid tablet computers designed by Asus. It is a sub-series of the Vivo series by Asus. The name is derived from the Latin word "to live" and, along with Asus's Transformer series of convertible devices running Windows, is a primary competitor to the Microsoft Surface.

The family is made up of the VivoTab, VivoTab RT, VivoTab RT 3G, VivoTab RT LTE, VivoTab Smart, and later on the VivoTab Note 8. All of the tablets come with Windows 8 (or Windows 8.1 on the Note 8), a 3-year subscription to Asus WebStorage. They have high definition screens advertise ultra-portability and extended battery life, and the ability detachable tablets. VivoTab RT has an MSRP of $599 USD (32 GB) and $699 (64 GB)

== Asus VivoTab ==
The Asus VivoTab is a convertible laptop powered by a 1.8 GHz Intel Atom Z2760 Dual Core CPU, 2 GB of RAM and 64 GB(SSD) of storage. The display is an 11.6" Corning Fit Glass display, with a capacitive touch screen, and a WACOM digitizer. The tablet has two cameras (2 MP front and 8 MP rear with flash), Wi-Fi and Bluetooth 4.0 connectivity, mini-HDMI output, a microSD card slot, and a 10.5 hour battery life.

The detachable keyboard dock accessory contains an additional battery (increasing the tablet's battery life to 19 hours) and a USB port.

== Asus VivoTab RT ==
Asus VivoTab RT was the ARM version of the VivoTab, running Windows RT. It featured a smaller screen than the VivoTab (10.1"), and Super IPS+ technology. This tablet is powered by the Nvidia Tegra 3 processor. This tablet also has a keyboard dock accessory, which includes a battery. It was discontinued in 2013 because of the low sales of Windows RT devices.

== Asus VivoTab Smart ==
Advertised as the faster version of the VivoTab, it features a multicolored keyboard that triples as a screen cover and stand. It has a shorter battery life than the original VivoTab (8 hours).

== Asus VivoTab Note 8 ==
This is the first small Windows 8.1 tablet from Asus, with a display size of 8 inches. It was announced in January 2014, and launched in February. It features an integrated Wacom digitizer stylus and is powered by a quad-core 1.8 GHz Intel Atom processor.

== Comparison of VivoTab Specifications ==
Models	VivoTab	VivoTab RT	VivoTab RT 3G	VivoTab RT LTE	VivoTab Smart	VivoTab 8 (M81C)
Operating system	Windows 8	Windows RT			Windows 8	Windows 8.1
Display	11.6" WXGA (1366x768)	10.1" WXGA (1366x768) Super IPS+ with Multi-touch Support			10.1" Multi-Touch WXGA (1366x768) IPS Panel	8" LED Backlight WXGA (1280x800), IPS, 10 finger multi-touch support
Processor	Dual-core Intel Atom Z2760 (1M cache, 1.80 GHz)	Quad-core Nvidia Tegra 3 1.3 GHz			Dual-core Intel Atom Z2760 (1M cache, 1.80 GHz)	Quad-core Intel Atom Z3745 (2M cache, up to 1.86 GHz)
Memory	2 GB					1 GB or 2 GB
Storage	64 GB eMMC	32 GB or 64 GB eMMC			64 GB	32 GB
Bluetooth	4.0					
Wi-Fi	802.11 b/g/n@2.4 GHz					802.11 a/b/g/n
GSM network standard	N/A		DC-HSPA+ UL:5.76 Mbit/s/DL:42 Mbit/s	4G LTE	N/A	
Front camera	2MP					
Rear camera	8MP					2MP
Dimensions (width x depth x height)	294.2 mm x 188.8 mm x 8.7 mm	262.5 mm x 170.9 mm x 8.3 mm			262.5 mm x 171 mm x 9.7 mm	211.7 mm x 124.9 mm x 8.8 mm
Weight	675 g	525 g	535 g		580 g	330 g
