= Riptide GP2 =

2014 video game

- Developer: Vector Unit
- Publisher: Vector Unit
- Platforms: iOS; Android; PlayStation 4 Windows; Xbox One
- Release: July 23, 2014
- Genre: Racing
- Modes: Single-player, multiplayer

Riptide GP2 is a jet ski racing video game developed and published by Vector Unit, an American video game development company based in San Rafael, California. It was first released for iOS on July 23, 2013, and was later released for Android, the PlayStation 4, Xbox One, and on Windows.

== Gameplay ==
In the main single-player career mode, players race against computer opponents around various tracks. Events award the player money, which can be used to upgrade or purchase new hydro jets. Experience is also earned by the player, and awards "sp" with each level up. The sp can be used to unlock new tricks or improve the player's tricks. Different events outside of generic races include hot lap, elimination, and freestyle events. The elimination events have computer opponents race against the player, with the losing vehicle eliminated every fifteen seconds until one is remaining.

== Reception ==
Reception

Aggregate score
Aggregator	Score
Metacritic	81/100 (iOS); 65/100 (Xbox)

Review scores
Publication	Score
MacLife	3.5/5 stars
TouchArcade	4.5/5 stars
AppSpy	4/5 stars
Pure Xbox	6/10
Slide to Play	3/4 stars

Riptide GP2 received generally favorable reviews according to the review aggregating website Metacritic. Writing for Touch Arcade, Eric Ford described it as "a first place sequel" to the 2011 game, Riptide GP. Ford also said that the game ran well on the current iOS hardware. Joseph Leray of MacLife wrote that the game has lots of content, but progression feels slow.

For the Xbox One version of the game, Pure Xbox's Ken Barnes wrote that the game was too similar to the mobile version and felt repetitive throughout the career mode. He also noted the lack of an online mode in the console version but stated that the five-dollar price made the game worth it.
