= Asus Eee Pad Transformer TF101 =

2-in-1 detachable tablet by Asus

Asus Eee Pad Transformer

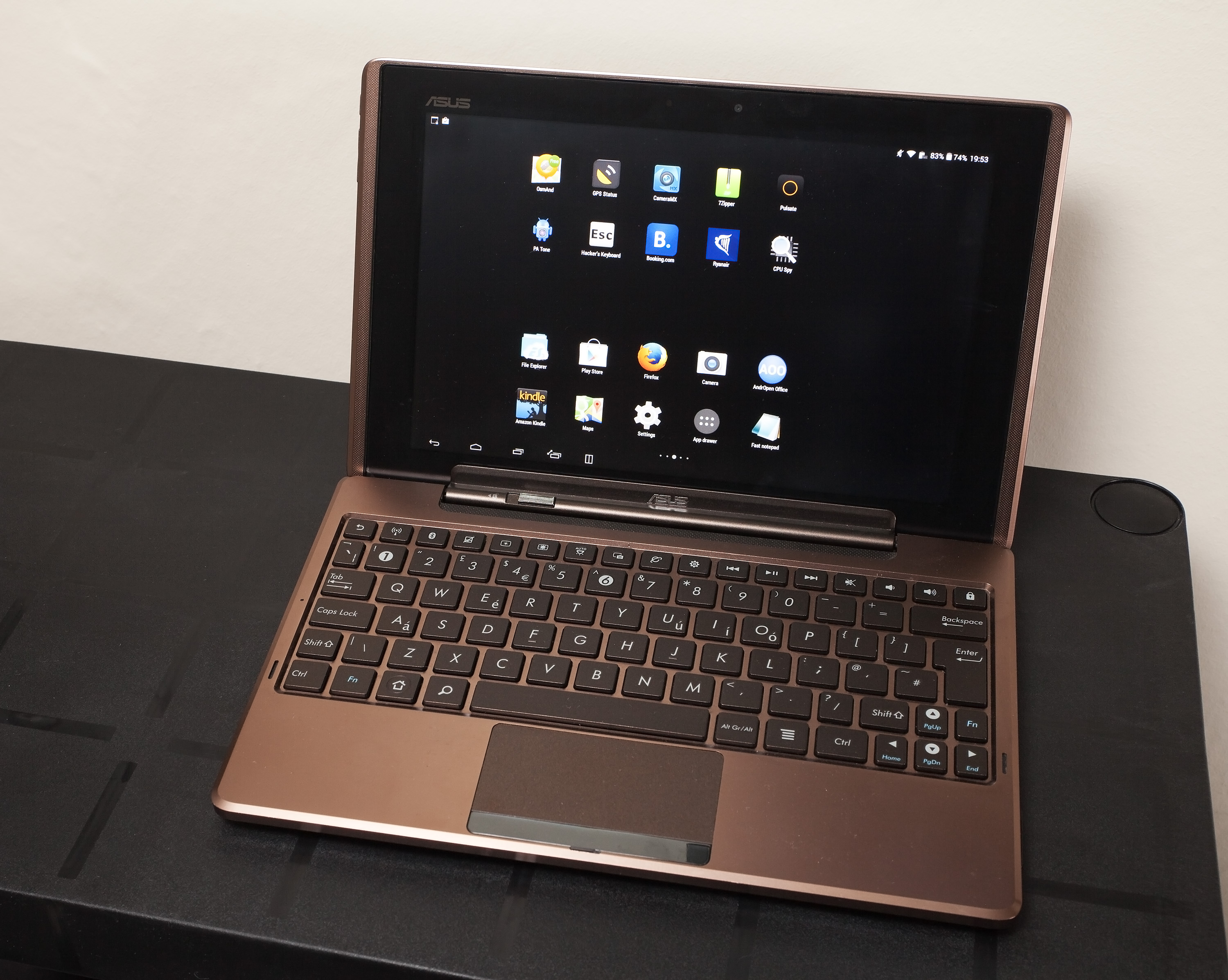
- Asus Eee Pad Transformer with docking keyboard
- Developer: Asus
- Type: Tablet, media player, PC
- Released: 2011-03-25: Taiwan 2011-04-06: United Kingdom; 2011-04-26: Canada, United States; 2011-05-07: France, Sweden 2011-05-24: Australia
- Operating system: Original: Android 3.1 "Honeycomb"; Current: Android 4.0.3 "Ice Cream Sandwich"
- CPU: 1 GHz dual-core Nvidia Tegra 2
- Memory: 1 GB
- Storage: Flash memory 16 or 32 GB, microSD slot (dock full size SD slot), unlimited Asus WebStorage
- Display: 1280×800 px (aspect ratio 16:10), 10.1 in (26 cm) diagonal, 149 PPI with Gorilla Glass
- Graphics: ULP GeForce
- Sound: speaker, microphone, headset jack
- Input: Multi-touch screen; dock keyboard + touchpad; compass; GPS receiver; Ambient light sensors; 3-axis accelerometer-gyroscope
- Camera: Back: 5 MP autofocus Front: 1.3 MP, for video calls
- Connectivity: Bluetooth 2.1; mini HDMI 1.3a; Dock 2x USB 2.0; DLNA; Wi-Fi 802.11b/g/n
- Power: 9.5 hours; 24.4 Wh Li-polymer battery, 16 hours with dock
- Dimensions: 10.6 in (270 mm) H 6.9 in (180 mm) W 0.51 in (13 mm) D
- Weight: 1.49 lb (680 g)
- Successor: Asus Eee Pad Transformer Prime

The Asus Eee Pad Transformer TF101 is a 2-in-1 detachable tablet developed by Asus that runs the Android operating system. It is the first tablet in the Asus Transformer Pad series. The Eee Pad Transformer features a 10.1-inch (260 mm) display, an Nvidia Tegra 2 dual-core chip, 1 GB of RAM, and 16 or 32 GB of storage. The tablet initially launched with Android 3.1, nicknamed "Honeycomb", but was updated to support Android 4.0.3 Ice Cream Sandwich.

The Eee Pad Transformer was announced at CES 2011, and was made available on 30 March 2011. The Transformer design includes an optional docking keyboard.

== History ==
In February 2010, Asus announced that it would be producing a tablet PC in its Asus Eee line of products, designed to rival the iPad. Semiconductor company Qualcomm had previously displayed an Android-based smartbook manufactured by Asus at Computex, generating interest in a laptop that uses the Android operating system; the device was ultimately scrapped out of concerns that the smartbook market was shrinking. In April, further details of a tablet PC in the Asus Eee line emerged, with Asus announcing that the device would support 3G connectivity and would be powered by an ARM processor, followed by reports in July that two models would be produced, running Android instead of Windows Embedded Compact 7. Both models were previously showcased at Computex 2010, although the larger model failed to turn on during the presentation, leaving the smaller model on display.

The Eee Pad Transformer was revealed at CES 2011.

== Features ==
The. Eee pc is a tablet computer with a 10.1" IPS multi-touch screen with a resolution of 1280 × 800 and an Nvidia Tegra 2 system-on-a-chip (SoC). It has an 802.11b/g/n Wi-Fi module, but lacks 3G connectivity. The price at launch of the Eee Pad was £379 (£429 with dock).

=== Docking keyboard ===
An optional docking keyboard was available at launch. It features full QWERTY keys, touchpad, two USB 2.0 ports and one SD card reader as well as an additional battery that increases overall battery life from 9.5 to 16 hours.

The USB ports support USB memory of any kind and also NTFS-formatted media with files larger than 4 GB. The SD card slot also supports NTFS-formatted media.

The units marketed in Canada marked Canadian BI Lingual (CBIL) have a slightly modified keyboard layout in addition to support of accented characters. The Shift key and Enter key have been made smaller to accommodate two additional keys.

== Software ==
The Transformer originally ran a modified version of Android 3.1 Honeycomb, but has since been updated to Android 4.0.3. The on-screen navigation keys (home, back, menu) have been skinned to resemble the standard Android phone keys.

The tablet is bundled with MyNet, MyLibrary, MyCloud, Press Reader, MyDesktop and Polaris Office 3, for full document editing.

The first software update was released by Asus on 16 April 2011. This updated the system with extra widgets for MyZine, which is a desktop widget shop, for weather, email, calendar, gallery, etc. It also added MyCloud, a remote desktop app.

As of early June 2011, Android 3.1 was released for the Transformer. It had general usability and speed updates, and added the ability to change the size of compatible widgets, added a large scroll bar to the browser, and allowed scrolling the currently open application screen, allowing many applications to be switched to quickly.

On 16 July 2011, another over the air software update for the Transformer was released. Beside the updates of the connectivity modules of the device, this changed the splashscreen, updated various apps, disabled the auto-rotate feature when the tablet is docked and added the Nvidia TegraZone market, with specific Tegra 2 units apps and games.

On 2 August 2011, the Transformer received updates to Android 3.2 and various minor changes. On 23 August 2011, the Transformer received another update, adding compatibility for the Netflix application.

Asus originally stated the Eee Pad Transformer will receive the Android 4.0 Ice Cream Sandwich in mid-February 2012, but when mid-February came and no update was released, Asus said in a statement that they would delay the release until sometime in March, due to the software still having to go through approval from Google.

On 23 February 2012, the 4.0.3 update rolled out to Taiwan Transformers with US tablets to get it a day later. UK tablets received it on 26 February 2012.

== Successors ==
The Asus Eee Pad Transformer Prime was announced by Asus in November 2011 as the successor to the Eee Pad Transformer. A teaser video was released by Asus on 19 October 2011, showing a slimmer design and a rear camera with LED flash. The tablet features a quad-core Nvidia Tegra 3 (Kal-El) chip by Nvidia, 10-inch display, micro-HDMI port, SD card slot, 14.5-hour battery life, and has a thickness of 8.3 mm. The US release date was 19 December 2011.

In March 2012, the Asus Transformer Pad Infinity was announced, which has an upgraded screen resolution of 1920 x 1200 pixels.

== See also ==
- Comparison of tablet computers
- Android version history
