= Asus Transformer =

Asus Transformer is a series of 2-in-1 convertibles, detachables and hybrid tablet computers, designed and manufactured by Asus, consisting of three major lineups.

== Asus Transformer Pad ==
Model	OS	Display	CPU	Memory	Storage	Wireless	Camera	Ports^{*dock port}	Battery	Dimensions^{*pad+dock}	Weight^{*pad+dock}
TF101	Android 3.2	10.1" LED Backlight WXGA (1280x800) screen	NVIDIA Tegra 2 Dual-core 1.00 GHz	1 GB DDR2	16 GB/32 GB	WLAN 802.11 b/g/n@2.4 GHz Bluetooth V2.1+EDR	1.2 MP Front Camera; 5 MP Rear Camera	1 x 2-in-1 Audio Jack (Headphone / Mic-in); 1 x mini HDMI; 1 x Micro SD Card Reader; 2 x USB 2.0 port* 1 x Card Reader (MMC/SD/SDHC)*; 2 x Docking port (Host + Client)*	24.4Wh Li-polymer (pad); 24.4Wh Li-polymer (dock); 9.5 hrs (16 hrs with dock)	271 x 176.8 x 12.98 mm	680 g
TF201	Android 4.0	10.1" LED Backlight WXGA (1280x800) screen	NVIDIA Tegra 3 T30 Quad-core 1.30 GHz	1 GB DDR2	32 GB/64 GB eMMC	WLAN 802.11 b/g/n@2.4 GHz Bluetooth V2.1+EDR	1.2 MP Front Camera; 8 MP Rear Camera; Auto focus (rear); Large F2.4 aperture (rear)	1 x 2-in-1 Audio Jack (Headphone / Mic-in); 1 x micro HDMI; 1 x Micro SD Card Reader; 1 x USB 2.0 port* 1 x SD Card Reader*	25Wh Li-polymer (pad); 22Wh Li-polymer (dock); 12 hrs (18 hrs with dock)	263 x 180.8 x 8.3 mm 263 x 180.8 x 17.3 mm*	586g 1123g*
TF300T	Android 4.1	10.1" LED Backlight WXGA (1280x800) screen	NVIDIA Tegra 3 T30L Quad-core 1.20/1.30 GHz	1 GB DDR3	16 GB/32 GB eMMC	WLAN 802.11 b/g/n@2.4 GHz Bluetooth V3.0+EDR	1.2 MP Front Camera; 8 MP Rear Camera; Auto focus (rear); BSI Sensor 5-element lens	1 x 2-in-1 Audio Jack (Headphone / Mic-in); 1 x micro HDMI; 1 x Micro SD Card Reader; 1 x USB 2.0 port* 1 x SD Card Reader*	22Wh Li-polymer (pad); 16.5Wh Li-polymer (dock); 10 hrs (15 hrs with dock)	263 x 180.8 x 9.9 mm 263 x 180.8 x 18.9 mm*	635g 1181g*
TF700T	Android 4.1	10.1" LED Backlight WUXGA (1920x1200) screen	NVIDIA Tegra 3 T33 Quad-core 1.6 GHz	1 GB DDR3	32 GB/64 GB eMMC	WLAN 802.11 b/g/n@2.4 GHz Bluetooth V3.0+EDR	2 MP Front Camera; 8 MP Rear Camera; Auto focus (rear) with Flash; BSI Sensor 5-element lens	1 x 2-in-1 Audio Jack (Headphone / Mic-in); 1 x micro HDMI; 1 x Micro SD Card Reader; 1 x USB 2.0 port* 1 x SD Card Reader*	25Wh Li-polymer (pad); 19.5Wh Li-polymer (dock); 9.5 hrs (14 hrs with dock)	263 x 180.8 x 8.5 mm 263 x 180.8 x 17 mm*	598g 1135g*
TF701T	Android 4.2	10.1" LED Backlight IGZO WQXGA (2560x1600) screen	NVIDIA Tegra 4 T40x Quad-core 1.9 GHz	2 GB DDR3L	32 GB/64 GB eMMC	WLAN 802.11 b/g/n@2.4 GHz and 5 GHz Bluetooth V3.0+EDR	1.2 MP Front Camera; 5 MP Rear Camera; Auto focus (rear); BSI Sensor 5-element lens F2.4 aperture (rear)	1 x 2-in-1 Audio Jack (Headphone / Mic-in); 1 x micro HDMI; 1 x Micro SD Card Reader; 1 x USB 3.0 port* 1 x SD Card Reader*	25Wh Li-polymer (pad); 19.5Wh Li-polymer (dock); 9.5 hrs (14 hrs with dock)	263 x 180.8 x 8.9 mm 263 x 180.8 x 17 mm*	585g 1120g*
TF103C	Android 4.4	10.1" LED Backlight WXGA (1280x800) screen	Intel® Atom™ Z3745 Dual-Core, 1.86 GHz	1 GB	8 GB/16 GB eMMC	WLAN802.11 a/b/g/n Bluetooth V4.0	0.3 MP Front Camera 2 MP Rear Camera	1 x Micro USB 1 x 2-in-1 Audio Jack (Headphone / Mic-in) 1 x MicroSD Card Reader 1 x USB 2.0 port	9.5 hours,19Wh Li-Polymer Battery	257.46 x 178.4 x 19.8 mm	1100g

== Asus Transformer Book ==
Asus Transformer Book is a line of detachable 2-in-1s that run Microsoft Windows.

=== Asus Transformer Book T100 (T100) ===
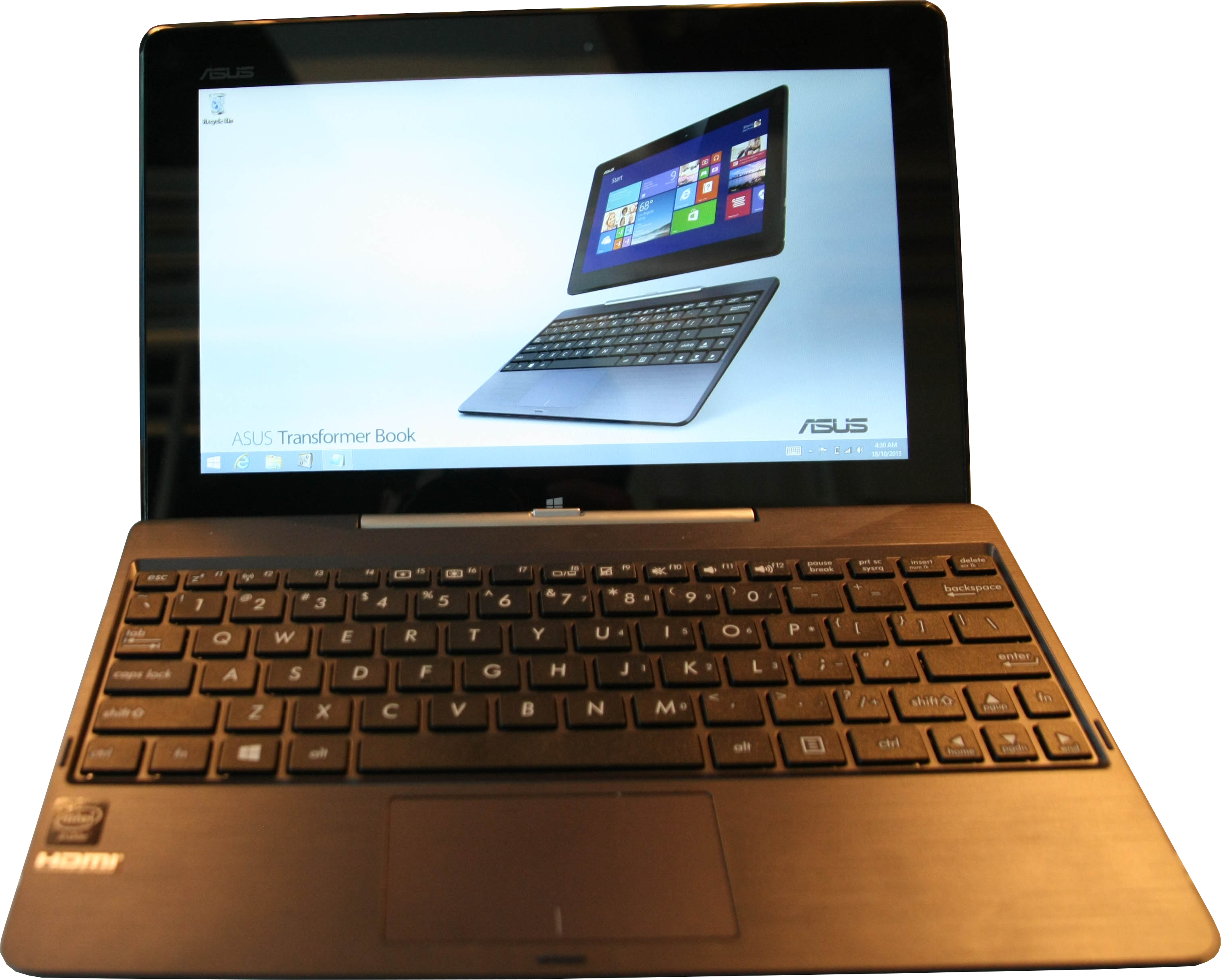
T100

The Asus Transformer Book T100 is a 2 in 1 laptop- tablet that is sold by Asus. It has a 1.2 MP camera.

=== ASUS Transformer Book T100TA (T100TA) ===
The ASUS Transformer Book T100TA is a tablet computer and docking keyboard. The tablet includes an Intel Atom Z3740 Quad Core processor running at 1.33 GHz, 2 GB RAM, 32 GB or 64 GB eMMC flash memory and a 10.1" HD touchscreen. The convertible laptop computer is made by Asus and sold from 2013 with the Windows 8.1 operating system.

=== Asus Transformer Book T100 Chi (T100CHI) ===
Asus Transformer Book T100 Chi (T100CHI)
- Also known as: Transformer Book T100 Chi (T100CHI)
- Developer: Asus
- Manufacturer: Asus
- Operating system: Windows 8.1
- CPU: Intel Atom
- Memory: OnBoard Memory 2 GB
- Storage: 32 GB eMMC; 64 GB eMMC
- Display: 10.1" 16:10 Full HD (1920x1200) LED Backlight Touchscreen LCD Panel
- Graphics: Integrated Intel® HD Graphics
- Sound: Built-in Speakers And Array Microphone
- Input: 1 x COMBO audio jack 1 x Micro USB; 1 x micro HDMI; 1 x micro SDXC card reader 1 x Volume up/down
- Camera: Front 2 MP and Rear 5 MP
- Touchpad: Yes
- Power: Output: 9 V DC, 2 A Input: 100 -240 V AC, 50/60 Hz universal
- Dimensions: 10.1 x 6.9 x 0.3 inch (WxDxH)
- Weight: 1.3 lbs (with Polymer Battery)

=== Asus Transformer Book T100 Chi Signature Edition (T100CHI-D4) ===
Asus Transformer Book T100 Chi Signature Edition (T100CHI-D4)
- Also known as: Transformer Book T100 Chi Signature Edition (T100CHI-D4)
- Developer: Asus
- Manufacturer: Asus
- Operating system: Windows 8.1
- CPU: Intel Atom Z3775
- Memory: OnBoard Memory 2 GB
- Storage: 32 GB eMMC; 64 GB eMMC
- Display: 10.1" 16:10 Full HD (1920x1200) LED Backlight Touchscreen LCD Panel
- Graphics: Integrated Intel® HD Graphics
- Sound: Built-in Speakers And Array Microphone
- Input: 1 x COMBO audio jack 1 x Micro USB; 1 x micro HDMI; 1 x micro SDXC card reader 1 x Volume up/down
- Camera: Front 2 MP and Rear 5 MP
- Touchpad: Yes
- Power: Output: 9 V DC, 2 A Input: 100 -240 V AC, 50/60 Hz universal
- Dimensions: 10.1 x 6.9 x 0.3 inch (WxDxH)
- Weight: 1.3 lbs (with Polymer Battery)

=== Asus Transformer Book T200 (T200) ===
Asus Transformer Book T200 (T200)
- Also known as: Transformer Book T200 (T200)
- Developer: Asus
- Manufacturer: Asus
- Operating system: Windows 8.1; Windows 8.1 Pro
- CPU: Intel® Bay Trail-T Quad Core Z3775 1.46 GHz Processor
- Memory: LPDDR3 MHz SDRAM, 2 GB
- Storage: 32 GB eMMC; 64 GB eMMC; 32 GB eMMC With 500 GB HDD
- Display: 11.6" 16:9 IPS HD (1366x768) with Multi-Touch Screen
- Graphics: Integrated Intel® HD Graphics
- Sound: Built-in 2 Speaker(s) And Digital Array Microphone
- Input: 1 x Microphone-in/Headphone-out jack 1 x USB 3.0 port(s); 1 x USB 2.0 port(s); 1 x RJ45 LAN Jack for LAN insert 1 x Micro USB; 1 x micro HDMI; Tablet: 1 x micro USB; 1 x micro SD card
- Camera: Front 2 Mp and Rear 5 Mp
- Touchpad: Yes
- Power: Output: 9 V DC, 2 A Input: 100 -240 V AC, 50/60 Hz universal
- Dimensions: Tablet: 305 x 194 x 11.95 mm (WxDxH); Dock: 305 x 200 x 14 mm (WxDxH)
- Weight: Tablet: 0.78 kg (with Polymer Battery); Dock: (Mobile Dock) 0.76 kg

=== Asus Transformer Book T300 (T300) ===
Asus Transformer Book T300 (T300)
- Also known as: Transformer Book T300 (T300)
- Developer: Asus
- Manufacturer: Asus
- Operating system: Windows 8.1
- CPU: Intel® Core™ M 5Y10/5Y71 Processor
- Memory: LPDDR3 1600 MHz SDRAM, 4 GB, up to 8 GB, OnBoard Memory 2 GB
- Storage: 128 GB ISSD
- Display: 12.5" 16:9 WQHD (2560x1440)/IPS FHD (1920x1080)/Wide View Angle
- Graphics: Integrated Intel® HD Graphics 5300
- Input: 1 x COMBO audio jack 1 x Micro USB; 1 x micro HDMI; 1 x micro SDXC card reader 1X AC adapter plug
- Camera: HD Web Camera
- Touchpad: Yes
- Dimensions: Tablet: 12.5 x 7.5 x 0.3 inch (WxDxH)
- Weight: Tablet: 1.6 lbs (with Polymer Battery)

=== Asus Transformer Book Trio ===
Asus Transformer Book Trio
- Also known as: Transformer Book Trio
- Developer: Asus
- Manufacturer: Asus
- Operating system: Windows 8 Tablet: Android 4.2 (Jelly Bean)
- CPU: Intel® Core™ i7 4500U Processor; Intel® Core™ i5 4200U Processor; Tablet : Intel® Z2560
- Memory: DDR3 1600(O.C.) MHz SDRAM, 4 GB; Tablet Memory: LP DDR2 1066 MHz 2 GB
- Storage: 500 GB HDD; 750 GB HDD; 1 TB HDD; Tablet: 16 GB up to 64 GB EMMC
- Display: 11.6" 16:9 IPS FHD (1920x1080)
- Graphics: Integrated Intel® HD Graphics 4400
- Sound: Built-in Speakers And Microphone; Bang & Olufsen ICEpower® SonicMaster
- Input: 1 x COMBO audio jack 2 x USB 3.0 port(s); 1 x micro HDMI; 1 x mini Display Port; 1X AC adapter plug 1 x micro USB; 1 x micro SD card 1 x audio jack COMBO; 1 x USB2.0 port in dock mode
- Camera: HD 720p CMOS module Tablet: Rear 5MP Front 720p HD camera
- Touchpad: Yes
- Dimensions: Tablet: 304.92 x 193.78 x 9.7 mm (WxDxH); Dock: 304.92 x 193.78 x 13.4 mm (WxDxH)
- Weight: Tablet: 0.7 kg (with 1 cell battery); Dock: 1.0 kg (with 2 cell battery)

=== Asus Transformer Book Duet ===
Asus Transformer Book Duet
- Developer: Asus
- Type: Convertible tablet
- Released: Cancelled
- Operating system: Android 4.2.2; Windows 8.1
- CPU: Intel Core i7
- Memory: 4 GB
- Storage: Flash memory 128 GB SSD, 1 TB HDD
- Display: 1920×1080 px (aspect ratio 16:9), 13.3 in (34 cm) diagonal
- Graphics: To be announced
- Sound: speaker, microphone, headset jack
- Input: Multi-touch screen; dock keyboard + touchpad; compass; GPS receiver; Ambient light sensors; 3-axis accelerometer-gyroscope
- Camera: To be announced
- Connectivity: Bluetooth V4.0+EDR; Full size HDMI 1.4; Dock 2x USB 2.0; Dock 1x USB 3.0; LAN Ethernet port; DLNA; Wi-Fi 802.11ac
- Power: 5 hours in Windows 8.1; 38 Wh Li-polymer battery, 6 hours in Android
- Dimensions: 216.3 mm (8.52 in) H 342.7 mm (13.49 in) W 12.9 mm (0.51 in) D
- Weight: 1,900 g (4.2 lb)
- Related: Asus Transformer Pad Infinity

The Transformer Book Duet TD300, was a 13.3-inch tablet computer that was developed by Asus. The device used two operating systems interchangeably: Windows 8.1 by Microsoft, and Android 4.1 by Google. The device featured a tablet screen and a detachable keyboard. The device was reported to be cancelled due to opposition from both Google and Microsoft in mid-March, 2014.

=== Asus Transformer Book T101 ===
Asus Transformer Book T101
- Also known as: Transformer Book T101
- Developer: Asus
- Manufacturer: Asus
- Operating system: Windows 10 Home; Windows 10 Pro
- CPU: Intel® Cherry Trail Quad-Core Z8350 Processor
- Memory: 4 GB SDRAM
- Storage: eMMC: 32 GB / 64 GB / 128 GB EMMC
- Display: 10.1" (16:10) LED backlit HD (1280x800) 60 Hz Glare Panel with 60% NTSC; Support ASUS Splendid Technology With WideView Technology
- Graphics: Integrated Intel HD Graphics
- Sound: Built-in Stereo 1.5 W Speakers And Digital Array Microphone; Support Windows 10 Cortana with Voice; ASUS SonicMaster Technology
- Input: 1 x COMBO audio jack 1 x USB 2.0 port(s); 1 x Micro USB; 1 x micro HDMI; 1 x micro SDXC card reader
- Camera: 2 Mega Pixel web camera
- Touchpad: Yes
- Dimensions: Tablet: 10.27 x 6.88 x 0.35 inch (WxHxD); Dock: 10.27 x 6.88 x 0.39 inch (WxDxH)
- Weight: Tablet: 0.62 kg Dock: 0.25 kg

=== Asus Transformer Mini T102 ===
Asus Transformer Mini T102
- Also known as: Transformer Mini T102
- Developer: Asus
- Manufacturer: Asus
- Operating system: Windows 10 Pro
- CPU: Intel® Cherry Trail Quad-Core Processor,
- Memory: 4 GB LPDDR3 1600MHz SDRAM Onboard Memory
- Storage: Tablet 32 GB, up to 128 GB EMMC
- Display: 10.1" (16:10) LED backlit HD (1280x800) 60 Hz Glossy Touchscreen with 60% NTSC; Support ASUS Splendid Technology With WideView Technology
- Graphics: Integrated Intel HD Graphics
- Sound: Built-in Stereo W Speakers And Digital Array Microphone; Support Windows 10 Cortana with Voice; ASUS SonicMaster Technology
- Input: 1 x COMBO audio jack 1 x Type A USB3.0 (USB3.1 GEN1); 1 x micro HDMI; 1 x Volume up/down 1 x micro USB; 1 x micro SD card
- Camera: HD Web Camera
- Touchpad: Yes
- Dimensions: Tablet: 261 x 172 x 10 mm (WxDxH); Dock: 262 x 173 x 5.7 mm (WxDxH)
- Weight: Tablet: 0.62 kg Dock: 0.25 kg

=== Asus Transformer Book T302 ===
Asus Transformer Book T302
- Also known as: Transformer Book T302
- Developer: Asus
- Manufacturer: Asus
- Operating system: Windows 10 Pro; Windows 10 Home
- CPU: Intel® Core™ M 6Y30/6Y75 Processor
- Memory: 4 GB LPDDR3 1600MHz SDRAM Onboard Memory, up to 8 GB SDRAM
- Storage: Solid State Drives: 128 GB/256 GB/512 GB SATA3 M.2 SSD
- Display: 12.5" (16:9) LED backlit WQHD (2560x1440) 60 Hz Glare Touchscreen with 72% NTSC; 12.5" (16:9) LED backlit FHD (1920x1080) 60 Hz Glare Touchscreen with 72% NTSC Support ASUS Splendid Technology
- Graphics: Integrated Intel HD Graphics 515
- Sound: Support Windows 10 Cortana; ASUS SonicMaster Technology
- Input: 1 x Microphone-in/Headphone-out jack 0 x USB 3.0 port(s); 1 x SD card reader
- Camera: HD Web Camera
- Touchpad: Yes
- Power: Plug Type: USB TYPE C Output: 20 V DC, 2.25 A, 45 W Input: 100 -240 V AC, 50/60 Hz universal
- Dimensions: Tablet: 317.8 x 191.6 x 8.05 mm (WxDxH) (w/ 2cell battery); Dock: (Mobile Dock) 317.8 x 191.6 x 3.5 ~10.5 mm (WxDxH) (w/ 2cell battery)
- Weight: Tablet: 750 g with Battery; Dock: (Mobile Dock)700 g with Battery

=== ASUS Transformer Pro T304UA ===
Asus Transformer Pro T304UA
- Also known as: Transformer Pro T304UA
- Developer: Asus
- Manufacturer: Asus
- Operating system: Windows 10 Home; Windows 10 Pro
- CPU: Intel® Core™ i7 7500U Processor; Intel® Core™ i5 7200U Processor; Intel® Core™ i3 7100U Processor
- Memory: LPDDR3 1866MHz SDRAM, up to 16 GB SDRAM
- Storage: Solid State Drives: 128 GB/256 GB/512 GB SATA3 M.2 SSD
- Display: 12.5" (3:2) LED backlit HD (2160x1440) 60 Hz Glare Panel with 45% NTSC
- Graphics: Integrated Intel HD Graphics 620
- Sound: Support Windows 10 Cortana; ASUS SonicMaster Technology
- Input: 1 x COMBO audio jack 1 x Type A USB3.0 (USB3.1 GEN1); 1 x Type C USB3.0 (USB3.1 GEN1); 1 x HDMI; 1 x micro SD card
- Camera: Front 2 MP and Rear 8 MP
- Touchpad: Yes
- Power: Plug Type: ø4 (mm); Output: 19 V DC, A, 45 W Input: 100 -240 V AC, 50/60 Hz universal
- Dimensions: Tablet: 11.77" x 8.30" x 0.34" (WxDxH)
- Weight: Tablet: 1.82 lb. with Battery

== Asus Transformer Book Flip ==
Asus Transformer Book Flip is a line of convertible 2-in-1s that run Microsoft Windows.

=== Asus Transformer Book Flip TP200 ===
Asus Transformer Book Flip TP200
- Also known as: Transformer Book Flip TP200
- Developer: Asus
- Manufacturer: Asus
- Operating system: Windows 10 Pro - ASUS recommends Windows 10 Pro. Windows 10 Home
- CPU: Intel® Pentium® Processor; Intel® Celeron® Processor
- Memory: OnBoard Memory 4 GB
- Storage: 64 GB eMMC
- Display: 11.6" 16:9 HD (1366x768)
- Graphics: Integrated Intel® HD Graphics
- Sound: ASUS SonicMaster Technology
- Input: 1 x Type A USB3.0 (USB3.1 GEN1); 0 x USB 3.0 port(s); 1 x USB 2.0 port(s); 1 x micro HDMI; 1 x audio jack COMBO
- Camera: VGA Web Camera
- Touchpad: Yes
- Power: Output: 19 V DC, 1.75 A, 33 W Input: 100 -240 V AC, 50/60 Hz universal
- Dimensions: 11.69 x 7.93 x 0.73 inch (WxDxH)
- Weight: kg

=== Asus Transformer Book Flip TP300 ===
Asus Transformer Book Flip TP300
- Also known as: Transformer Book Flip TP300
- Developer: Asus
- Manufacturer: Asus
- Operating system: Windows 8.1
- CPU: Intel® Core™ i3 4030U 1.9 GHz Processor
- Memory: DDR3L 1600 MHz SDRAM, 4 GB
- Storage: 500 GB HDD
- Display: 13.3" 16:9 HD (1366x768) with Multi-Touch Screen Glare panel
- Graphics: Integrated Intel® HD Graphics 4400
- Sound: Built-in Speakers And Microphone; ASUS SonicMaster Lite Technology
- Input: 1 x COMBO audio jack 2 x USB 3.0 port(s); 1 x USB 2.0 port(s); 1 x HDMI; 1 x SD card reader 1X AC adapter plug 1 x Volume up/down
- Camera: HD Web Camera
- Touchpad: Yes
- Power: Output: 19 V DC, 2.37 A, 45 W Input: 100 -240 V AC, 50/60 Hz universal
- Dimensions: 12.8 x 9.1 x 0.86 inch (WxDxH) (w/ 3cell battery)
- Weight: 3.8 lbs (with 3 cell battery)

=== Asus Transformer Book Flip TP500 ===
Asus Transformer Book Flip TP500
- Also known as: Transformer Book Flip TP500
- Developer: Asus
- Manufacturer: Asus
- Operating system: Windows 10
- CPU: Intel® Core™ i7 5500U/4510U Processor; Intel® Core™ i5 4210U/5200U Processor; Intel® Core™ i3 5010U/4030U/4005U Processor
- Memory: DDR3L 1600(O.C.) MHz SDRAM, 1x DIMM Socket for Expansion up to 8Gb
- Storage: 500 GB HDD 5400; 500 GB HDD 5400 With 24 GB SSD; 750 GB HDD 5400; 750 GB HDD 5400 With 24 GB SSD; 1 TB HDD 5400; 1 TB HDD 5400 With 24 GB SSD; 1.5 TB HDD 5400; 1.5 TB HDD 5400 With 24 GB SSD
- Display: 15.6" 16:9 HD (1366x768)/Full HD (1920x1080)
- Graphics: Integrated Intel® HD Graphics 4400/NVIDIA GeForce 840M
- Sound: Built-in Speakers And Microphone; SonicMaster Lite Technology; MaxxAudio support
- Input: 1 x COMBO audio jack 1 x USB 3.0 port(s); 2 x USB 2.0 port(s); 1 x RJ45 LAN Jack for LAN insert 1 x HDMI; 1 x micro SDXC card reader
- Camera: VGA Web Camera
- Touchpad: Yes
- Power: Output: 19 V DC, 3.42 A, 65 W Input: 100 -240 V AC, 50/60 Hz universal
- Dimensions: 14.96 x 10.15 x 0.86 inch (WxDxH)
- Weight: 4.62 lbs

=== Asus Transformer Book Flip TP550 ===
Asus Transformer Book Flip TP550
- Also known as: Transformer Book Flip TP550
- Developer: Asus
- Manufacturer: Asus
- Operating system: Windows 10 Home; Windows 10 Pro
- CPU: Intel® Core™ i7 4500U Processor; Intel® Core™ i5 4200U Processor
- Memory: OnBoard Memory 4 GB, 1 x DIMM socket for expansion up to 8 GB SDRAM
- Storage: 500 GB HDD 5400 RPM; 750 GB HDD 5400 RPM; 1 TB HDD 5400 RPM; 500 GB HDD 7200 RPM; 750 GB HDD 7200 RPM; 1 TB HDD 7200 RPM
- Display: 15.6" 16:9 HD (1366x768)
- Graphics: Integrated Intel® HD Graphics 4400
- Sound: Built-in Speakers And Microphone; SonicMaster Lite Technology; MaxxAudio support
- Input: 1 x COMBO audio jack 1 x USB 3.0 port(s); 2 x USB 2.0 port(s); 1 x RJ45 LAN Jack for LAN insert 1 x HDMI; 1 x micro SDXC card reader DVD drive
- Camera: VGA Web Camera
- Touchpad: Yes
- Power: Output: 19 V DC, 3.42 A, 65 W Input: 110 -240 V AC, 50/60 Hz universal
- Dimensions: 14.96 x 10.27 x 1.07 inch (WxDxH)
- Weight: 5.7 lbs (with 2 cell battery)
