= Lenovo A6000 =

Android smartphone

Lenovo A6000 is an Android smartphone manufactured by Lenovo.

== Features ==
- Rear Camera: 8.0 MP
- Front Camera: 1.3 MP (2 MP for "plus" variant)
- Memory: 1 GB RAM (2 GB RAM for "plus" variant)
- Storage: 8 GB (16 GB for "plus" variant)
- Battery: Lithium-ion Polymer 2300 mAh
- Size: 5 Inch
- Operating System: Android 4.4.4 Kitkat, upgradable to Android 5.0.2 lollipop
- Weight: 128 g
- IPS capacitive touchscreen
- CPU: Quad-core 1.2 GHz Cortex-A53
- Chipset: Qualcomm MSM8916 Snapdragon 410
- GPU: Adreno 306
- WLAN: Wi-Fi 802.11 b/g/n, hotspot
- Bluetooth: v4.0, A2DP
- USB: microUSB v2.0
- Sensors: Accelerometer, proximity
- OTG : NO
- External storage: up to 32 GB
