= Asus Transformer Pad TF300T =

Tablet PC by Asus

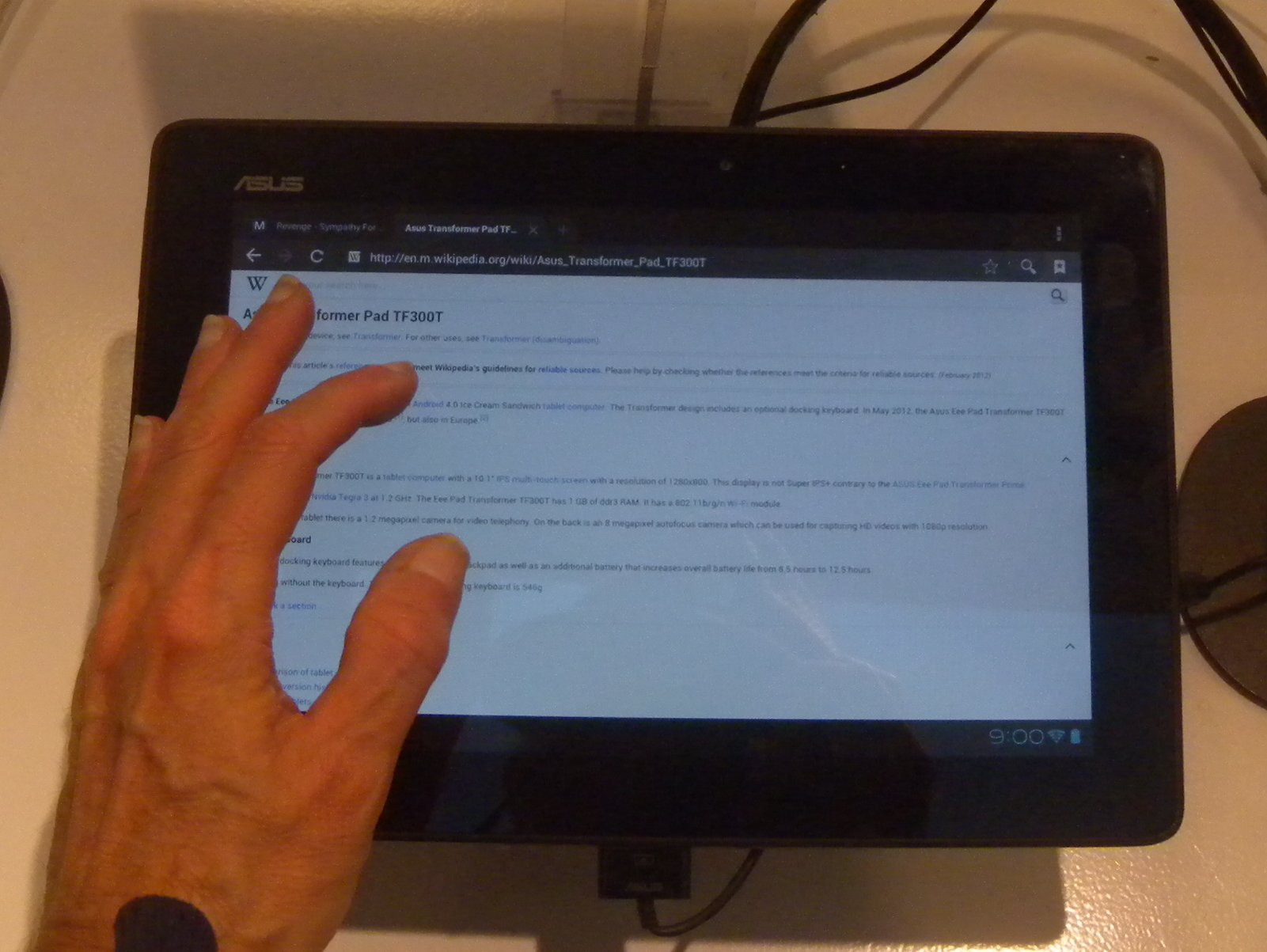
- Asus Eee Pad Transformer TF300T
- Developer: Asus
- Type: Convertible tablet
- Operating system: Android 4.0 "Ice Cream Sandwich" (upgradable to Android 4.2 "Jelly Bean")
- CPU: 1.3 GHz quad-core Nvidia Tegra 3 T30L
- Memory: 1 GB
- Storage: Flash memory 16 or 32 GB, microSD slot (dock full size SD slot), unlimited Asus WebStorage
- Display: 1280×800 px LED (aspect ratio 16:10) IPS (brightness 350 nits), 10.1 in (26 cm) diagonal, 149 PPI not Gorilla Glass
- Graphics: ULP GeForce
- Sound: stereo speakers(not separated), microphone, headset jack
- Input: Multi-touch screen; dock keyboard + touchpad; compass; GPS receiver; Ambient light sensors; 3-axis accelerometer-gyroscope
- Camera: Rear: 8 MP autofocus Front: 1.2 MP
- Connectivity: Bluetooth V3.0+EDR; micro HDMI 1.3a; Dock 1x USB 2.0; DLNA; Wi-Fi 802.11b/g/n
- Power: 10 hours; 22 Wh Li-polymer battery, 15 hours with dock
- Dimensions: 263 mm (10.4 in) H 180 mm (7.1 in) W 9.9 mm (0.39 in) D
- Weight: 635 g (1.400 lb)
- Related: Asus Eee Pad Transformer Prime; Asus Transformer Pad Infinity
- Website: Official website

The Asus Transformer Pad TF300T is a 2-in-1 detachable tablet from the Asus Transformer Pad series. It runs Android, has a quad-core processor, and a successor to Asus Eee Pad Transformer Prime. The Transformer design includes an optional docking keyboard. The Asus Transformer Pad TF300T was released on the market in the U.S. and Europe in May 2012.

== Features ==
The Asus Transformer Pad TF300T is a tablet computer with a LED 10.1" IPS 10-finger multi-touch screen with a resolution of 1280x800. This display is not Super IPS+ contrary to the ASUS Eee Pad Transformer Prime. The unit does not employ Gorilla Glass, and is therefore more susceptible to breakage.

The processor is an Nvidia Tegra 3 T30L at 1.2 GHz upon initial release with Android 4.0.X ICS, but overclocked to 1.3 GHz upon updating to Android 4.1 Jelly Bean (latest firmware is Android 4.2.1). The Transformer Pad TF300T has 1 GB of DDR3 SDRAM, and an 802.11b/g/n Wi-Fi module.

At the front of the tablet there is a 1.2-megapixel camera for video conferencing. On the back is an 8-megapixel (5-element lens) BSI CMOS sensor with autofocus camera which can be used for capturing HD videos with 1080p resolution.

The TF300 was the first 'non-Nexus' device to receive Android 4.2 Jelly Bean; but that was also the last update ever received as Asus abandoned it shortly thereafter.

=== Docking keyboard ===
The optional docking keyboard features full QWERTY keys, touchpad as well as an additional battery that increases overall battery life from 8.5 hours to up to 15 hours.

There are multiple reports of the screen cracking due to the amount of stress the hinges puts on the screen when opening and closing the unit.

Weight: 640g without the keyboard. The weight of the docking keyboard is 546g.

== 3G and LTE models ==
A 3G model supporting HSPA+, HSDPA and quad-band GSM has been released as the TF300TG.

An LTE model supporting the above cellular standards as well as LTE has been released as the TF300TL.

== Custom ROM Development ==
CyanogenMod 11 or later, an unofficial updated version of Android can be installed onto the TF300T tablet. In addition, the TF300 continues to be supported by an active community of aftermarket operating system developers at XDA Developers several years after its initial release.

== Reception ==
The Verge noted the good performance, build quality and battery life. They also noted that Android 4.0 has some issues, the keyboard is cramped and that the display isn't particularly special. Anandtech noted that it is a good successor to the earlier version.

== See also ==
- Comparison of tablet computers
- Android version history
