= Asus Transformer Pad TF701T =

Tablet computer released in 2013

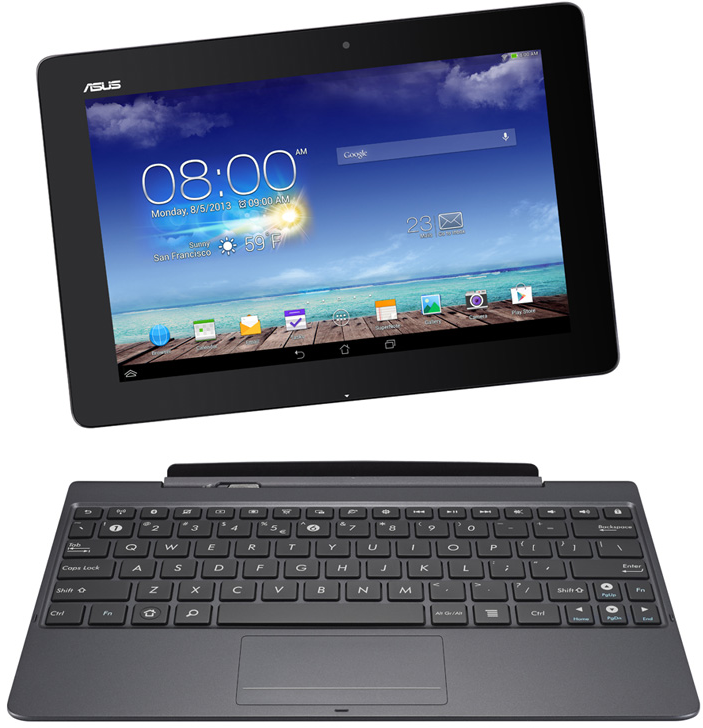
- Also known as: K00C
- Developer: Asus
- Manufacturer: Asus
- Type: Convertible Tablet, media player, PC
- Released: November 2013
- Operating system: Android 4.2.2 "Jelly Bean"
- System on a chip: 1.9 GHz quad-core Cortex-A15 Nvidia Tegra 4 T114 (Wayne) chipset
- Memory: 2 GB
- Storage: Tablet : Flash memory 32 or 64 GB (eMMC) and 1 microSD slot (SDHC/SDXC) that supports up to 128GB, Mobile dock : 1 full size SD slot,
- Display: WQXGA (2560x1600 px), LED-backlit LCD screen (16:10 aspect ratio), 10.1 in (26 cm) diagonal, IGZO IPS, 300 PPI with Gorilla Glass 2
- Graphics: 72 Core GeForce (VLIW-based VEC4 units)
- Sound: Premium Speaker with SonicMaster technology (Stereo speaker), microphone, audio jack (headphone + mic-in)
- Input: Multi-touch screen; Dock keyboard + touchpad; G sensor for LCD auto-orientation; Compass (E-compass sensor); GPS and GLONASS receiver; Ambient light sensors; 3-axis accelerometer-gyroscope
- Camera: Back: 5 MP autofocus (1080p recording); Front: 1.2 MP (720p video recording), for video calls
- Connectivity: Bluetooth V3.0+EDR; Micro HDMI 1.4a; 1x USB 3.0 (with dock); DLNA; Wi-Fi 802.11a/b/g/n; Support Miracast
- Power: 13 hours; 31 Wh Li-polymer battery, 17 hours with dock
- Dimensions: 180.8 mm (7.12 in) H 263 mm (10.4 in) W 8.9 mm (0.35 in) D
- Weight: 585 g (1.290 lb)
- Predecessor: Asus Transformer Pad Infinity
- Website: Official website

The Asus Transformer Pad TF701T is an Android tablet computer made by Asus, successor to the Asus Transformer Pad Infinity. The Transformer design includes a docking keyboard. The Asus Transformer Pad TF701T was released in the UK in October 2013 and in the U.S. in November 2013.

The tablet includes a Tegra 4 T114 processor clocked at 1.9 GHz, and an upgraded 2560×1600 pixel resolution screen, increasing the pixel density to 300 PPI and a mobile dock. Asus Transformer Pad TF701T had powerful hardware for its time according to the reviewers and after being discontinued, the users could perform an unofficial system update using CyanogenMod 12.1 which enabled the user to install Android Lollipop 5.1.1.

Reception for the Asus Transformer Pad TF701T was generally mixed.

== History ==
The Asus Transformer Pad TF701T was announced in June 2013. It's the successor to the Asus Transformer Pad Infinity. Asus released the Asus Transformer Pad TF701T on 5 November 2013 (US) taking orders for $449 ($599 for a tablet and keyboard bundle) with 32 GB memory model.

== Specifications ==
=== Accessories ===
The Asus Transformer Pad TF701T could be purchased with a mobile dock that featured a laptop-like keyboard. Its mobile dock's keyboard offers the user quick access to features such as "Back" button, Wi-Fi, Bluetooth, Track pad ON/OFF, Auto-Brightness, Screenshot, Web-browser, Music track options, Volume control, Screen-lock. The tablet has a proprietary charger port which is also used to connect the tablet to the mobile dock.

=== Hardware ===
The Asus Transformer Pad TF701T features a quad–core 1.9 GHz Cortex-A15 processor with 2 GB of memory. It is available in 32 or 64 GB storage variants, with expandable microSD card support for up to 64 GB. It has Bluetooth 3.0 support and a claimed battery life of 17 hours (with the dock). The tablets body dimensions are 263 mm × 180.8 mm × 8.9 mm (10.35 in × 7.12 in × 0.35 in). It weighs 585 g (1.29 lb) and has a Super IPS+ LCD, capacitive touchscreen, 16M colors display with the size of 10.1 inches, 295.8 cm^{2} (~62.2% screen-to-body ratio) and a resolution of 2560 × 1600 pixels, 16:10 ratio (~299 ppi density) The display uses Gorilla Glass 2. The main camera has 5 megapixels and features HDR and can capture video at 1080p@30 fps, while its selfie camera has 1.2 megapixels and can capture video at 720p. The tablet has proprietary charging port, which means that tablet cannot be charged with micro USB. The port is also used to connect the tablet to its mobile dock. The mobile dock has a single USB 3.0 port which enables the use of USB flash drives.

=== Software ===
The Asus Transformer Pad TF701T was released with the Android 4.2.2 Jelly Bean operating system By default the tablet has "ASUS Quick Settings" enabled that changes the default settings dropdown list. The Asus Transformer Pad TF701T has an application that is used to monitor the battery percentage of both the tablet itself and the mobile dock. The very last software update it received was on 12 February 2015, which improved the tablet's power consumption as well as its system performance. Since the support for the Asus Transformer Pad TF701T has been discontinued, users can perform an unofficial upgrade using CyanogenMod 12.1 which will enable the user to install Android Lollipop 5.1.1.

== Reception ==
Reception for the Asus Transformer Pad TF701T was generally mixed. According to a review on the YouTube channel "ROZETKA", "all of the ASUS Transformer devices look practically the same and their design almost hasn’t changed for the past three generations. The tablet doesn’t sit on the mobile dock very firmly and dangles around a bit when entering text." During the same review, the reviewer claimed that the thick bezels around the screen give the tablet a bad look now that most competing devices have thinner, nicer looking bezels. A few other reviewers have praised the device and its mobile dock for its quick access to certain apps. A criticised feature of the Asus Transformer Pad TF701T is its proprietary charging port that cannot be found in public charging spots.
