= Riptide GP =

2010 video game made by vector unit on Google i/o 2011

- Developer: Vector Unit
- Publishers: Starz digital (THD) , vector unit
- Platforms: iOS; Android; Windows
- Release: December 31, 2010; 15 years ago
- Genre: Racing
- Mode: Single-player

Riptide GP is a jet ski racing video game developed and published by Vector Unit, an American video game development company based in San Rafael, California. It was first released for Android on May 26, 2011, and later released for iOS and Windows. The game was later released as a free download.

== Gameplay ==
Players race against five computer opponents in separate championship events, at three different speeds. The game has six tracks in total, with an additional six being reversed versions. Players control jet skis, and can perform tricks to gain boosts in mid-air.

== Reception ==
Reception

Aggregate score
Aggregator	Score
Metacritic	67/100

Review scores
Publication	Score
Pocket Gamer	7/10
TouchArcade	3.5/5 stars
AppSpy	4/5 stars
Multiplayer.it	8.2/10
Slide to Play	2/4 stars

The game drew comparisons to Wave Race from some outlets, including App Spy, which also described the look of the water as a positive game aspect. Multiplayer.it reviewer Tommaso Pugliese described the racing as spectacular, as well as the water quality. Thorin Klosowski of Touch Arcade was disappointed with the lack of a multiplayer mode, but described it as a "solid race with good controls."

Bulent Yusuf of Pocket Gamer described the graphics as average, and that the game was "a few updates away from greatness." He also criticized the lack of a multiplayer mode. Andrew Webster of Slide to Play gave the game a critical review. The lack of tracks and vehicle options were a primary concern for Webster, as well as limited control options at the time of release. However, he described the game as a "competent and enjoyable race," still noting the lack of replayability.
