= Asus Transformer Pad TF700T =

Android-based tablet computer

Asus Transformer Pad Infinity
- Developer: Asus
- Type: Tablet, media player, PC
- Operating system: Android Jelly Bean 4.2.1
- CPU: 1.6 GHz quad-core Cortex-A9 Nvidia Tegra 3 T-33 chipset
- Memory: 1 GB
- Storage: Flash memory 32 or 64 GB, microSD slot (full size SD slot with dock),
- Display: 1920×1200 px, LED-backlit LCD screen (16:10 aspect ratio), 10.1 in (26 cm) diagonal, Super IPS+, 224 PPI with Gorilla Glass 2
- Graphics: ULP GeForce
- Sound: Stereo speaker, dual microphone, audio jack (headphone + mic-in)
- Input: Multi-touch screen; Dock keyboard + touchpad; Compass; GPS receiver; Ambient light sensors; 3-axis accelerometer-gyroscope
- Camera: Back: 8 MP autofocus with LED flash (1080p recording); Front: 2 MP, for video calls
- Connectivity: Bluetooth V3.0+EDR; Micro HDMI 1.4a; 2x USB 2.0 (with dock); DLNA; Wi-Fi 802.11b/g/n
- Power: 9.5 hours; 25 Wh Li-polymer battery, 14 hours with dock
- Dimensions: 180.8 mm (7.12 in) H 263 mm (10.4 in) W 8.5 mm (0.33 in) D
- Weight: 598 g (1.318 lb)
- Predecessor: Asus Eee Pad Transformer Prime
- Successor: Asus Transformer Pad TF701T
- Related: Asus Transformer Pad TF300T
- Website: https://www.asus.com/Tablets_Mobile/ASUS_Transformer_Pad_Infinity_TF700T

Asus Transformer Pad TF700T or Asus Transformer Pad Infinity - is a tablet computer made by Asus, successor to the Asus Transformer Prime. The manufacturer announced it at CES 2012, less than a month after the original product launch, to launch Q2 2012.

This new model includes a Tegra 3 T33 processor clocked at 1.6 GHz (as opposed to the Prime's T30), and an upgraded 1,920×1,200-pixel-resolution screen, more than doubling the pixel count of the prior model. The display was upgraded to a Super IPS+ panel for ultra bright outdoor readability with 178° wide viewing angles. In response to the signal problems it includes a new back-panel design with the upper part made of plastic to enhance Wi-Fi, Bluetooth, and GPS performance. The front camera was boosted from 1.2 megapixels to 2 megapixels. It has improved graphics performance with a 12-core GPU.

== Successor ==
In November 2013 a successor was released by the name of Asus Transformer Pad Infinity TF701. The new Transformer Pad was upgraded with a Tegra 4 CPU, a 2560x1600 resolution display with 300 ppi, 2GB RAM and other upgrades over its predecessor.

== CyanogenMod ==
CyanogenMod 11 or newer is supported on the TF700T tablet.
