= HIDPoint =

- Stable release: 2.1.1.172 / February 15, 2012; 13 years ago
- Operating system: RHEL, Fedora, Suse, Ubuntu
- Type: Device driver
- License: Proprietary
- Website: hidpoint.com

HIDPoint is proprietary Linux software for USB Keyboards and Mice. Currently it supports most Logitech keyboards and mice. It runs on many Linux distributions such as RHEL, SUSE, Ubuntu and Fedora. HIDPoint has been designed to give users using USB Mice and Keyboards the same experience they get when using these devices on Microsoft Windows.

== Features ==
- Allows users to fully utilize the functionality provided by their hardware.
- Allows full use of Multimedia buttons, “Office” keys, and Programmable keys.
- Users have the same experience as in Windows.
- Single binary distribution for all supported Operating systems.
- GUI Installer and Uninstaller.
- No run time dependencies to install.

== Currently supported platforms ==
- Ubuntu 10.10 (Maverick Meerkat)
- Ubuntu 10.04 (Lucid Lynx)
- Ubuntu 9.10 (Karmic Koala)
- Ubuntu 9.04 (Jaunty Jackalope)
- Linux Mint 9 (Isadora)
- Linux Mint 8 (Helena)
- Linux Mint 7 (Gloria)
- Linux Mint 6 (Felicia)
- Debian 5
- Red Hat Enterprise Linux 5.0
- Red Hat Enterprise Linux 4.0
- CentOS 5.0
- Suse 10.2
- Suse 10.1
- Suse 10.0
- Mandriva 2008 and 2010
- Fedora Core 6.0
- Fedora Core 4.0

SMP (multi-processor/multi-core) are not yet supported. 64bit drivers are available for selected Platforms.

== Currently supported mice ==
- Logitech Cordless Mouse for Notebooks
- Logitech Cordless Click
- Logitech MX 1000 Laser Mouse
- Logitech Media Play Cordless
- Logitech V500 Cordless Mouse
- Logitech G3/MX518 Optical Mouse
- Logitech Cordless Click Plus
- Logitech V200 Cordless Mouse
- Logitech Cordless Mini Optical Mouse
- Logitech LX7 Cordless Optical Mouse
- Logitech LX5 Cordless Optical Mouse
- Logitech G5 Laser Mouse
- Logitech G7 Laser Mouse
- Logitech MX610 Laser Cordless Mouse
- Logitech MX610 Left Handed Laser Cordless Mouse
- Logitech G1 Optical Mouse
- Logitech MX400 Laser Mouse
- Logitech G3 Laser Mouse
- Logitech V450 Laser Mouse
- Logitech VX Revolution
- Logitech MX Air mouse
- Logitech MX Revolution
- Logitech MX 600 Cordless Laser
- Logitech LX7 Cordless Laser Mouse
- Logitech MX 620 Cordless Laser
- Logitech V220 Cordless Optical
- Logitech LX8 Cordless Optical Mouse
- Logitech VX Nano
- Logitech LX8 Cordless Optical Mouse
- Logitech LX6 Cordless Optical Mouse
- Logitech V450 Laser Mouse
- Logitech MX 700 Cordless Optical Mouse
- Logitech MX 900

== Currently supported keyboards ==
- Logitech LX 500 Cordless Keyboard
- Logitech LX 501 Cordless Keyboard
- Logitech LX 300 Cordless Keyboard
- Logitech Numeric Keypad
- Logitech Cordless Ultra Flat Keyboard
- Logitech EX 110 Series Keyboard
- Logitech Media Keyboard Elite
- Logitech MX 3000 Keyboard
- Logitech S510 Keyboard
- Logitech Comfort Keyboard
- Logitech LX 710 Keyboard
- Logitech MX 3200 Keyboard
- Logitech Easy Call Keyboard
- Logitech Wave Cordless Keyboard
- Logitech Wave Corded Keyboard

== Other keyboard/mice software ==
- Microsoft IntelliPoint
- Logitech SetPoint
