= Surface Laptop (1st generation) =

Laptop by Microsoft

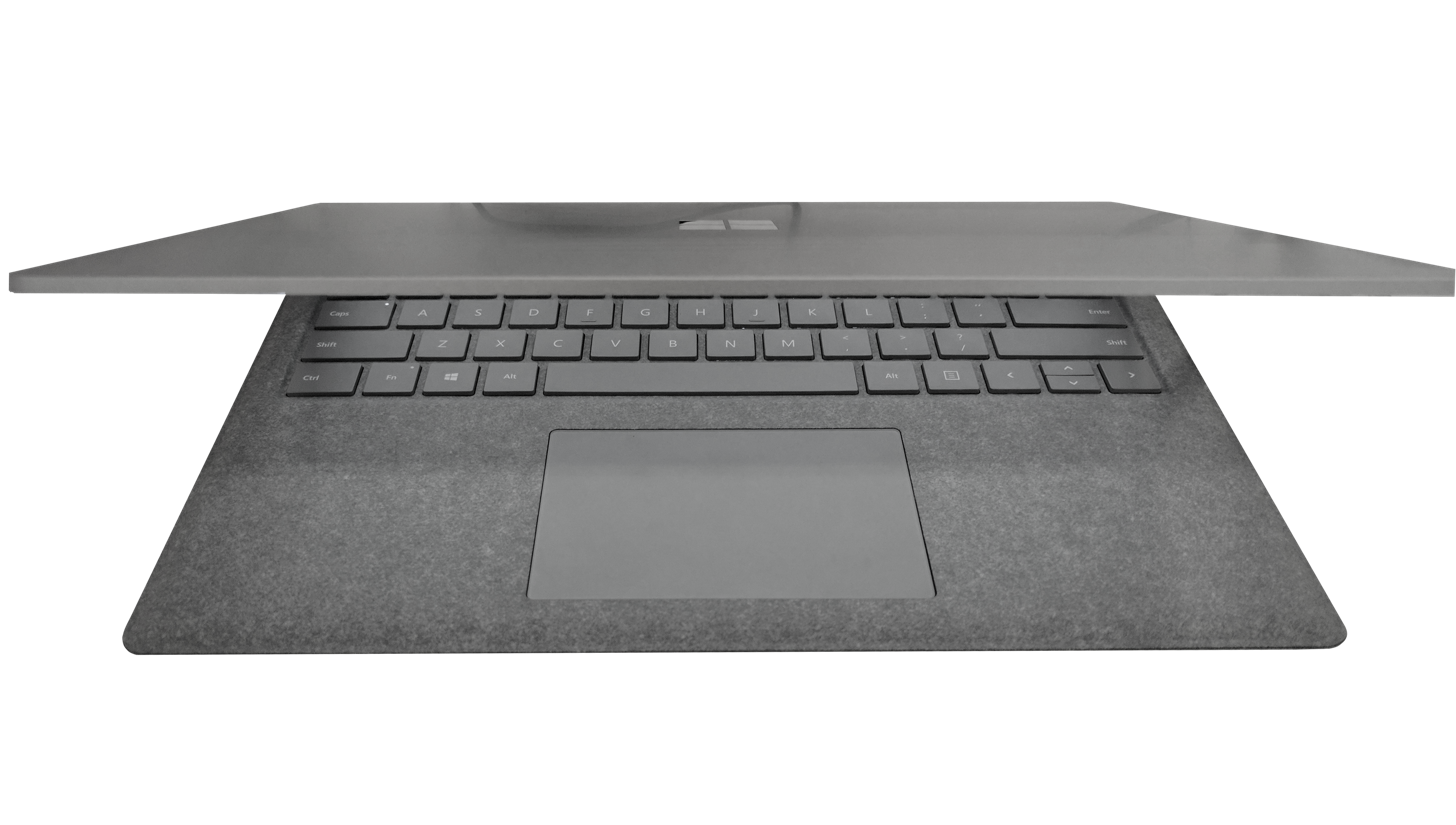
- Surface Laptop in Platinum
- Developer: Microsoft
- Product family: Microsoft Surface
- Type: Laptop
- Generation: First
- Released: 2 May 2017; 9 years ago
- Availability: 15 June 2017; 9 years ago
- Introductory price: USD799 to 2,699
- Operating system: Windows 10 S (upgradeable to Home or Pro)
- CPU: Intel Core m3-7Y30; Intel Core i5-7200U; Intel Core i7-7660U
- Memory: 16 GB, 8 GB or 4 GB LPDDR3 RAM
- Storage: 1 TB, 512 GB, 256 GB, 128 GB SSD
- Removable storage: none
- Display: 13.5 inch Touchscreen; PixelSense Display; 2256 x 1504, (201 ppi); 3:2 Aspect Ratio
- Graphics: m3: Intel HD Graphics 615 i5: Intel HD Graphics 620 i7: Intel Iris Plus 640
- Sound: Omnisonic Speakers with Dolby Audio, 3.5 mm headphone jack, Stereo microphones
- Input: Built in: touchscreen, ambient light sensor, keyboard, touchpad Sold Separately: mouse, stylus pen
- Camera: 720p HD camera
- Touchpad: Built-in
- Connectivity: WiFi 4, Bluetooth 5, USB 3, Mini DisplayPort
- Online services: Microsoft Store, OneDrive
- Dimensions: 308 mm × 223 mm × 14 mm (12.13 in x 8.79 in x 0.57 in)
- Weight: 1,250 grams (2.76 lb)
- Successor: Surface Laptop 2
- Related: Surface
- Website: www.surface.com

The Surface Laptop is a laptop computer designed by Microsoft as part of the company's Surface line of personal computing devices. When it debuted, the laptop was intended to compete with Apple's MacBook Air and MacBook Pro.

The laptop was announced at the #MicrosoftEDU event by Microsoft on 2 May 2017, alongside Windows 10 S and an updated version of Surface Arc Mouse that includes a large capacitive surface. It became available for pre-order on the same day, and began shipping on 15 June 2017.

== Configuration ==
Surface Laptop Configuration Options
Price Tier in USD	CPU	Integrated GPU	RAM	Internal Storage	Color
$799	Intel Core m3-7Y30 (1.0 to 2.6 GHz)	HD 615	4 GB	128 GB	P
$999	Intel Core i5-7200U (2.5 to 3.1 GHz)	HD 620	4 GB	128 GB	P
$1,099	Intel Core i5-7200U (2.5 to 3.1 GHz)	HD 620	8 GB	128 GB	P
$1,299	Intel Core i5-7200U (2.5 to 3.1 GHz)	HD 620	8 GB	256 GB	P B C G
$1,599	Intel Core i7-7660U (2.5 to 4.0 GHz)	Iris 640	8 GB	256 GB	P B C G
$2,199	Intel Core i7-7660U (2.5 to 4.0 GHz)	Iris 640	16 GB	512 GB	P B C G
$2,699	Intel Core i7-7660U (2.5 to 4.0 GHz)	Iris 640	16 GB	1 TB	P

Platinum Burgundy Cobalt Blue Graphite Gold

== Features ==
- 7th generation Intel Kaby Lake CPU.
- Intel HD and Iris Graphics GPU
- Alcantara fabric keyboard with a 1.5mm travel backlit keys
- Windows 10 S operating system
- 13.5-inch PixelSense display with a 3:2 aspect ratio
- 14.5 hour battery life
- 110.6 Mbit/s SSD
- Integrated vapor chambers into the aluminum finish

== Hardware ==
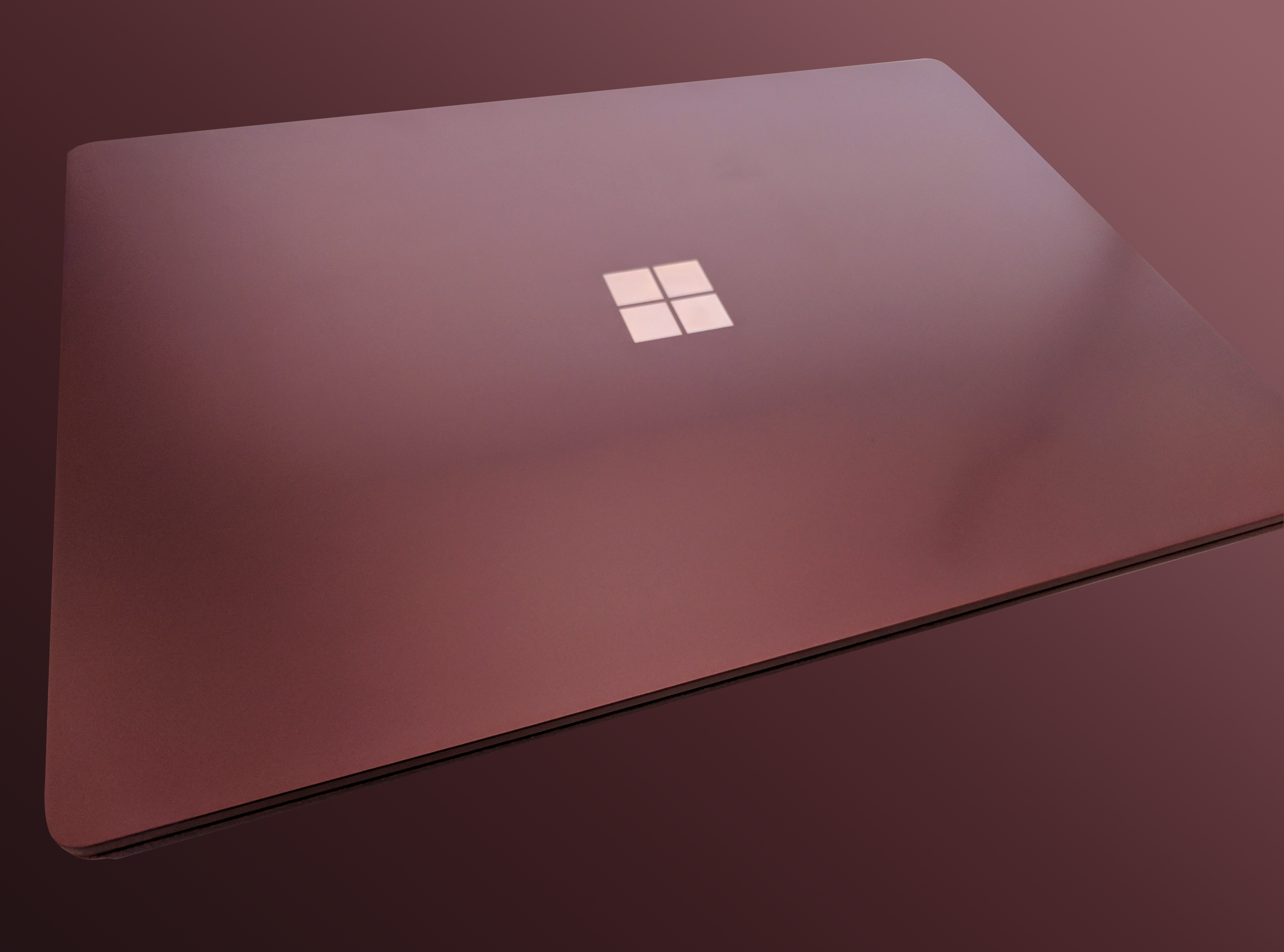
Burgundy version of the Surface Laptop

The Surface Laptop is the 5th addition to Surface lineup, following the Surface Pro, Surface Hub, Surface Book, and the Surface Studio. Unlike the other products, the Surface Laptop is aimed toward students. Microsoft claims a 14.5-hour battery life when running Windows 10 S, but testing suggests that the battery can be depleted to 50% in just 2.5 hours. It comes in four colors: Platinum, Graphite Gold, Burgundy, and Cobalt Blue as advertised.

It has a 13.5-inch "PixelSense" Display at 2256 × 1504 using a 3:2 aspect ratio. It features a 10-point touch screen along with Surface Pen support. Unlike other ultra-portables by Microsoft, this does not feature any sort of detachment mechanism from the keyboard.

The Surface Laptop uses seventh-generation "Kaby Lake" processors, with both Intel Core i5 and i7 variants. It uses Intel HD Graphics 620 on the Core i5 version, while the Core i7 model uses Intel Iris Plus 640.

Three system memory options are available at purchase: 4, 8, and 16 GB and three SSD options: 128, 256, and 512 GB. These cannot be upgraded in the future. The SSD has a transfer speed of 110.6 Mbit/s, which is quite slow when compared to its competitors.

The Surface Laptop cannot be opened without destroying it, making it impossible to repair or upgrade. It has an internal battery with a capacity of 45.2 Wh. All other parts are either glued or soldered.

== Software ==
Surface Laptop models used to ship with Windows 10 S, a feature-limited edition of Windows 10 with restrictions on software usage which has now been replaced with Windows 10 in S Mode; users can only install software from Windows Store, and system settings are locked to only allow Microsoft Edge as the default web browser with Bing as its search engine, since third-party web browsers using custom layout engines are banned from Windows Store.

The device may be upgraded to Windows 10 Pro for free, which removes these restrictions.

== Timeline ==
Timeline of Surface devices
Sources: Microsoft Devices Blog Microsoft Surface Store Microsoft Surface for Business store

Preceded by None	Surface Laptop; 1st generation	Succeeded by Surface Laptop 2
