= Surface Laptop 4 =

Microsoft model laptop

- Developer: Microsoft
- Product family: Microsoft Surface
- Type: Laptop
- Generation: Fourth
- Released: 13 April 2021; 5 years ago
- Availability: 13 April 2021; 5 years ago
- Introductory price: 15.0": USD 1,299 - 2,399; 13.5": USD 999 - 2,299
- Operating system: Windows 10 (Upgradeable to Windows 11)
- CPU: Intel Core i5 1135G7 or Intel Core i5 1145G7 or Intel Core i7 1185G7 or AMD Ryzen 5 4680U or AMD Ryzen 7 4980U
- Memory: 32 GB or 16 GB or 8 GB RAM
- Storage: 1 TB, 512 GB, 256 GB, 128 GB SSD
- Removable storage: none
- Display: PixelSense Touchscreen; 3:2 Aspect Ratio; 15.0": 2496 x 1664, 201 PPI; 13.5": 2256 x 1504, 201 PPI
- Graphics: Iris Xe Graphics; Radeon Graphics Microsoft Surface Edition
- Sound: Omnisonic Speakers with Dolby Atmos, 3.5 mm headphone jack, Dual far-field Studio Mics
- Input: Built in: touchscreen, ambient light sensor, keyboard, touchpad Sold Separately: mouse, stylus pen, Surface Dial
- Camera: 720p HD f2.0 camera
- Touchpad: Built-in
- Connectivity: WiFi 6, Bluetooth 5, USB C
- Online services: Microsoft Store, OneDrive
- Dimensions: 15.0": 339.5 x 244 x 14.7 mm (13.4 x 9.6 x 0.58 in); 13.5": 308 x 223 x 14.5 mm (12.1 x 8.8 x 0.57 in)
- Weight: 15.0": 1,542 grams (3.400 lb); Platinum & Matte Black Metal; 13.5": 1,265 grams (2.789 lb); Platinum & Blue Alcantara; 1,288 grams (2.840 lb); Matte Black & Sandstone Metal
- Predecessor: Surface Laptop 3
- Successor: Surface Laptop 5
- Related: Surface Laptop Studio
- Website: microsoft.com

The Surface Laptop 4 was a laptop computer made by Microsoft. It is the fourth generation of Surface Laptop which launched on 13 April 2021. It succeeds the Surface Laptop 3, which was released in 2019.

Surface Laptop 4 keeps the same form design and ports as its predecessor. The machine ships with an Intel 11th gen or AMD processor. There are models with an aluminum finish alongside models with the traditional Alcantara fabric covering.

The displays are also the same as the previous models. The 13.5 inch model comes with a 2256 x 1504 resolution and the 15 inch model comes with a 2496 x 1664 resolution. Both models have the same 3:2 aspect ratio and 201 ppi.

== Configuration ==
Surface Laptop 4 Configuration Options
| Price Tier in USD | | Size | CPU | GPU | RAM | Internal Storage | Color | | | | |
| Consumer | Business | Size | CPU | GPU | RAM | Internal Storage | Color | | | | |
|---|---|---|---|---|---|---|---|---|---|---|---|
| $1,000 | $1,100 | 13.5" | AMD Ryzen 5 4680U | Radeon Graphics (7 CU / 448 shaders @ 1.5 GHz) | 8 GB | 256 GB | | A | | | |
| $1,200 | $1,300 | 13.5" | AMD Ryzen 5 4680U | Radeon Graphics (7 CU / 448 shaders @ 1.5 GHz) | 16 GB | 256 GB | | A | | | |
| | $1,700 | 13.5" | AMD Ryzen 7 4980U | Radeon Graphics (8 CU / 512 shaders @ 1.95 GHz) | 16 GB | 512 GB | | | | B | |
| | $1,200 | 13.5" | Intel Core i5 1135G7 (Note: for consumers) or 1145G7 (Note: for business) | Intel Iris Xe Graphics (80 EU @ 1.30 GHz) | 8 GB | 256 GB | | A | | | |
| $1,300 | $1,400 | 13.5" | Intel Core i5 1135G7 or 1145G7 | Intel Iris Xe Graphics (80 EU @ 1.30 GHz) | 8 GB | 512 GB | I | A | S | B | |
| $1,500 | $1,600 | 13.5" | Intel Core i5 1135G7 or 1145G7 | Intel Iris Xe Graphics (80 EU @ 1.30 GHz) | 16 GB | 512 GB | I | A | S | B | |
| | $1,600 | 13.5" | Intel Core i7-1185G7 | Intel Iris Xe Graphics (96 EU @ 1.35 GHz) | 16 GB | 256 GB | | | | B | |
| $1,700 | $1,800 | 13.5" | Intel Core i7-1185G7 | Intel Iris Xe Graphics (96 EU @ 1.35 GHz) | 16 GB | 512 GB | I | A | S | B | |
| $2,300 | $2,400 | 13.5" | Intel Core i7-1185G7 | Intel Iris Xe Graphics (96 EU @ 1.35 GHz) | 32 GB | 1 TB | | | | B | |
| $1,300 | $1,400 | 15" | AMD Ryzen 7 4980U | Radeon Graphics (8 CU / 512 shaders @ 1.95Ghz) | 8 GB | 256 GB | | | | | P |
| $1,500 | | 15" | AMD Ryzen 7 4980U | Radeon Graphics (8 CU / 512 shaders @ 1.95Ghz) | 8 GB | 512 GB | | | | B | P |
| $1,700 | $1,800 | 15" | AMD Ryzen 7 4980U | Radeon Graphics (8 CU / 512 shaders @ 1.95Ghz) | 16GB | 512 GB | | | | B | |
| | $1,500 | 15" | Intel Core i7-1185G7 | Intel Iris Xe Graphics (96 EU @ 1.35 GHz) | 8 GB | 256 GB | | | | | P |
| | $1,700 | 15" | Intel Core i7-1185G7 | Intel Iris Xe Graphics (96 EU @ 1.35 GHz) | 8 GB | 512 GB | | | | B | P |
| | $1,700 | 15" | Intel Core i7-1185G7 | Intel Iris Xe Graphics (96 EU @ 1.35 GHz) | 16 GB | 256 GB | | | | B | P |
| $1,800 | $1,900 | 15" | Intel Core i7-1185G7 | Intel Iris Xe Graphics (96 EU @ 1.35 GHz) | 16 GB | 512 GB | | | | B | P |
| $2,400 | $2,500 | 15" | Intel Core i7-1185G7 | Intel Iris Xe Graphics (96 EU @ 1.35 GHz) | 32 GB | 1 TB | | | | B | |

I | Ice Blue Alcantara A | Platinum Alcantara S | Sandstone Metal B | Matte Black Metal P | Platinum Metal

Surface Laptop 4 for consumers comes preloaded with Windows 10 Home
Surface Laptop 4 for business comes preloaded with Windows 10 Pro

== Features ==
- An 11th Gen Intel Core i5 or i7 processors
- An AMD Ryzen 5 or 7 Surface Edition processors
- Storage options are 1 TB, 512 GB, 256 GB, and 128 GB removable
- Windows Hello with IR camera for facial recognition login
- A headphone jack, a USB-C port
- Up to 19 hours battery life for either model
- 427 nits screen brightness

== Timeline ==
Timeline of Surface devices
Sources: Microsoft Devices Blog Microsoft Surface Store Microsoft Surface for Business store

| Preceded by Surface Laptop 3 | Surface Laptop 4; 4th generation | Succeeded by Surface Laptop 5 |
