= Surface Laptop SE =

Laptop by Microsoft

- Developer: Microsoft
- Product family: Microsoft Surface
- Type: Laptop
- Generation: First
- Released: November 9, 2021; 4 years ago
- Availability: Early 2022
- Introductory price: US$249 to US$329
- Operating system: Windows 11 SE
- CPU: Intel Celeron N4020; Intel Celeron N4120
- Memory: 8 GB or 4 GB RAM
- Storage: 128 GB or 64 GB eMMC
- Removable storage: none
- Display: 11.6 inch TFT LCD Module; 1366 x 768, 16:9 Aspect Ratio
- Graphics: Intel UHD Graphics 600
- Sound: 2W stereo speakers, 3.5 mm headphone jack
- Input: keyboard, touchpad
- Camera: 1 MP, 720p HD camera
- Touchpad: Built-in
- Connectivity: WiFi 5, Bluetooth 5, USB C, USB A
- Online services: Microsoft 365
- Dimensions: 283.70 mm x 193.05 mm x 17.85 mm (11.17 in x 7.6 in x 0.70 in)
- Weight: 1,112.4 grams (2.452 lb)
- Related: Surface Laptop Go
- Website: www.surface.com

The Surface Laptop SE is a laptop computer manufactured by Microsoft. Unveiled on November 9, 2021, it is an entry-level model in the Surface Laptop series positioned exclusively towards the education market.

== Specifications ==
The Surface Laptop SE has a plastic body and shares some components (such as the keyboard) with the Surface Laptop Go. Microsoft stated that it was designed to be more repairable than other Surface models, with replacement parts (such as batteries, displays, keyboards, and motherboards) to be available through its service partners for on-site repairs.

The device uses an Intel Celeron CPU, with configurations using either a Celeron N4020 with 4 GB of RAM and 64 GB of internal storage, or the N4120 with 8 GB of RAM and 128 GB of internal storage. It has two USB ports, one of which is USB-C. Unlike other Surface models, the Laptop SE uses a round, non-magnetic power connector. It includes a 10.1-inch screen at 1366×768 resolution, and a one-megapixel webcam.

It ships with Windows 11 SE, a variant of the operating system with optimizations for the education market.

== Timeline ==
Timeline of Surface devices
Sources: Microsoft Devices Blog Microsoft Surface Store Microsoft Surface for Business store

== Reception ==
The Surface Laptop SE has received multiple complaints as Windows 11 does not work well with 8GB of RAM or less.
