= Arc Mouse =

Family of computer mice by Microsoft

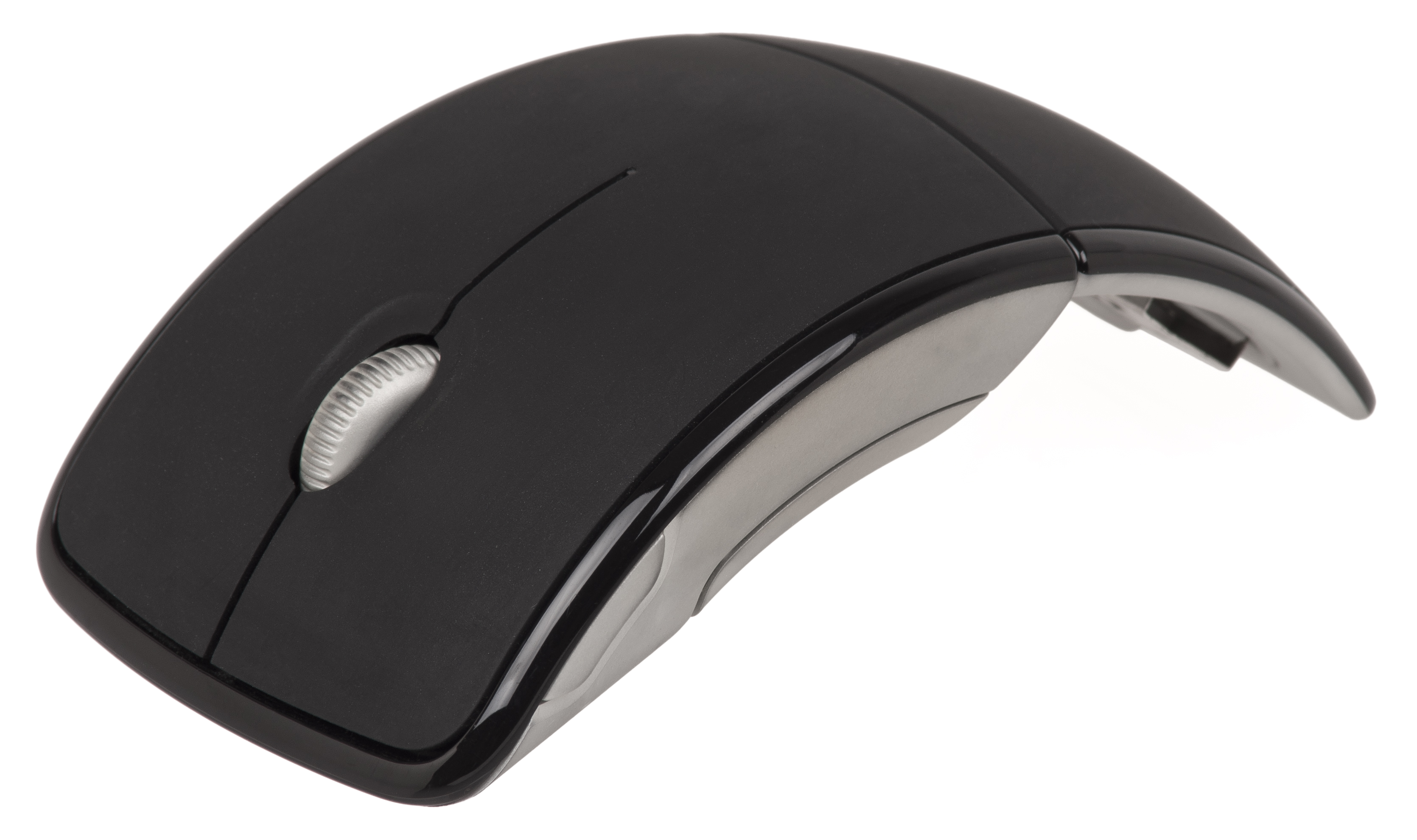
- First generation Arc Mouse
- Also known as: Surface Arc Mouse; Arc Touch Mouse
- Manufacturer: Microsoft
- Type: Computer mouse
- Released: 2008

The Arc Mouse is a family of portable computer mice produced by Microsoft first released in 2008. A mobile mouse, the device has evolved over a number of years, including special editions designed to coordinate with the company's Surface family of computers. All versions of the Arc Mouse are folding and include scrolling capability.

== Versions ==
=== Arc Mouse ===
The mouse folds flat using a magnetic folding and locking system. Wireless communication was provided over 2.4 GHz, and the mouse used a laser for tracking.

=== Arc Touch Mouse ===
An updated version, the Arc Touch Mouse, changed the design and main interface points, and was released in 2010. Instead of folding for portability, the Touch Mouse flattens from its curved "in-use" shape. In place of the scroll wheel on the original, the second version features a capacitive touch strip for scrolling. The touch strip is speed sensitive, includes 3 buttons (1 each for page up and page down, and 1 programmable), and features haptic feedback.

=== Arc Touch Bluetooth Mouse ===
To match its Surface devices, Microsoft updated the design of the Arc Touch Mouse. The new design is grey and features a new touch strip. Bluetooth is used for connectivity. interestingly, the device has no power switch, as when it is flexed, a piece inside the device actuates to hit an internal switch. it also uses an haptic feedback motor to simulate scrolling.

=== Surface Arc Mouse/Microsoft Arc Mouse ===
Announced along with the Surface Laptop in 2017, the Surface Arc Mouse replaces the buttons and touch strip with a large capacitive touch surface, and it's available in colors that match the new laptop. As of December 2019, the mouse is available on the Microsoft Store for $69.99.
