= IntelliPoint =

Microsoft mouse software

- Developer(s): Microsoft
- Final release: 8.2 (Win), 8.2 (v.305) (Mac OS X) / November 11, 2011 (Mac OS X)
- Operating system: Mac OS X, Microsoft Windows
- Type: Device driver
- License: Proprietary
- Website: www.microsoft.com/hardware/mouseandkeyboard/default.mspx

Microsoft IntelliPoint is the Microsoft-branded software driver for the company's hardware mice. Microsoft has released versions for both Windows and Mac OS X. It has been succeeded by Microsoft Mouse and Keyboard Center, which combines IntelliType (a Microsoft keyboard driver) with IntelliPoint.

== Features ==
Software features may only be available with certain mice models. (Button options are specific to the selected model.) On Mac OS X 10.4-10.7.x, IntelliPoint features can be accessed by opening Microsoft Mouse in System Preferences.

Depending on the software version and specific mouse product, users can define mouse buttons to run any executable program or file they desire (or a control key + letter combination) and can even define buttons for different functions in chosen programs.

With IntelliPoint 4, users were able to specify mouse wheel behavior to scroll one screen at a time. This feature was useful in situations where the user had to work with windows of varying size and a fixed scroll rate alternated from being too fast or too slow depending on each window. This feature was incorporated into the Windows XP operating system and removed in IntelliPoint 5. The "Alt+Tab" button combination was also replaced with "Next Window," effectively preventing users from alternating between specific programs, and instead having to cycle through one by one (although this can be hacked back in the registry).

=== Scrolling ===
Universal Scrolling is a software function within IntelliPoint that allows a scroll wheel to work with programs that do not natively support that method of input. If a program supports scroll wheels natively, the Universal Scrolling feature will generally not interfere with the native implementation.

== Supported mice ==
IntelliPoint supports older models of Microsoft mice, as well as generic 3/5-button mice.

IntelliPoint's help file

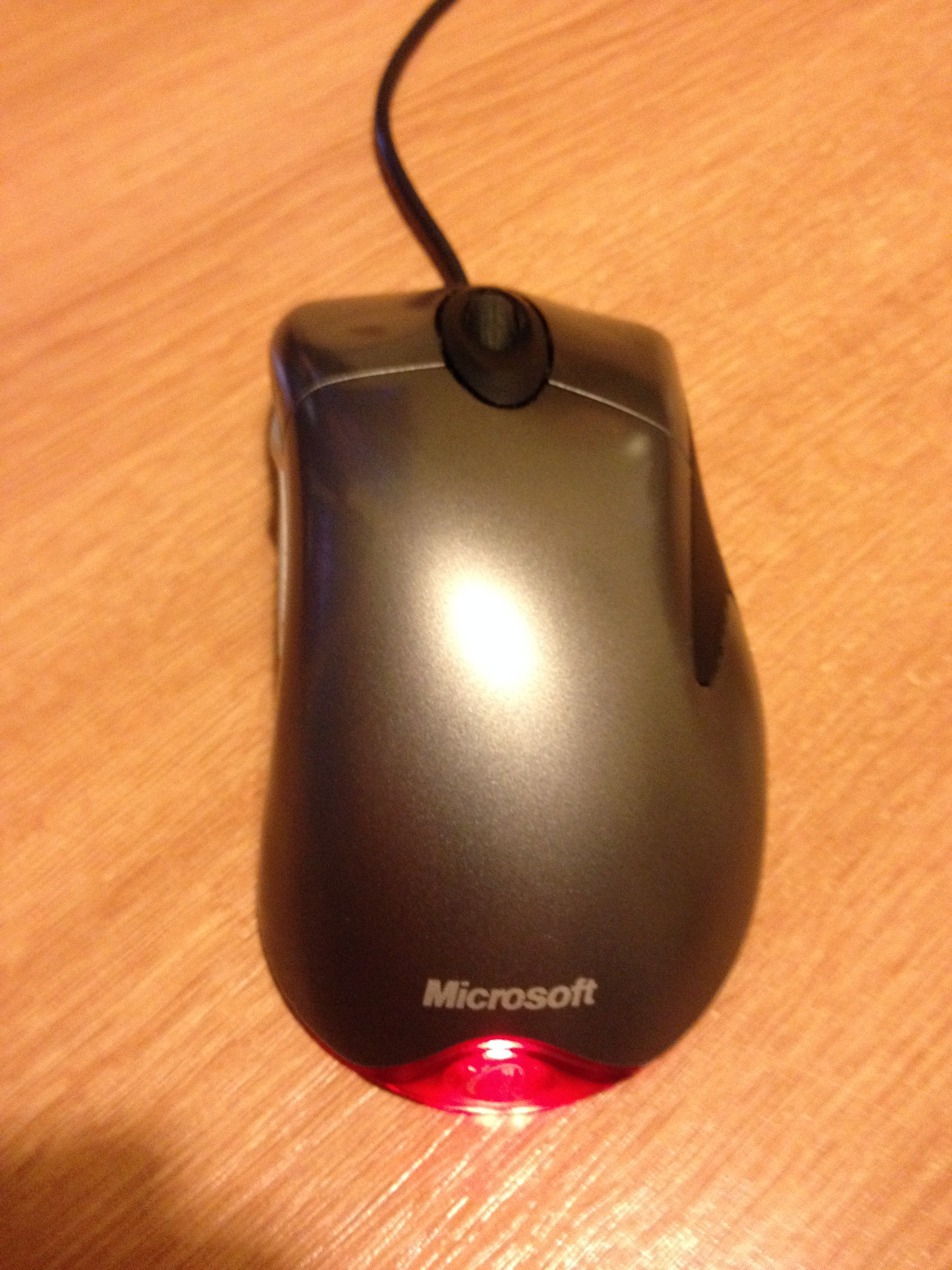
IntelliMouse Explorer 3.0

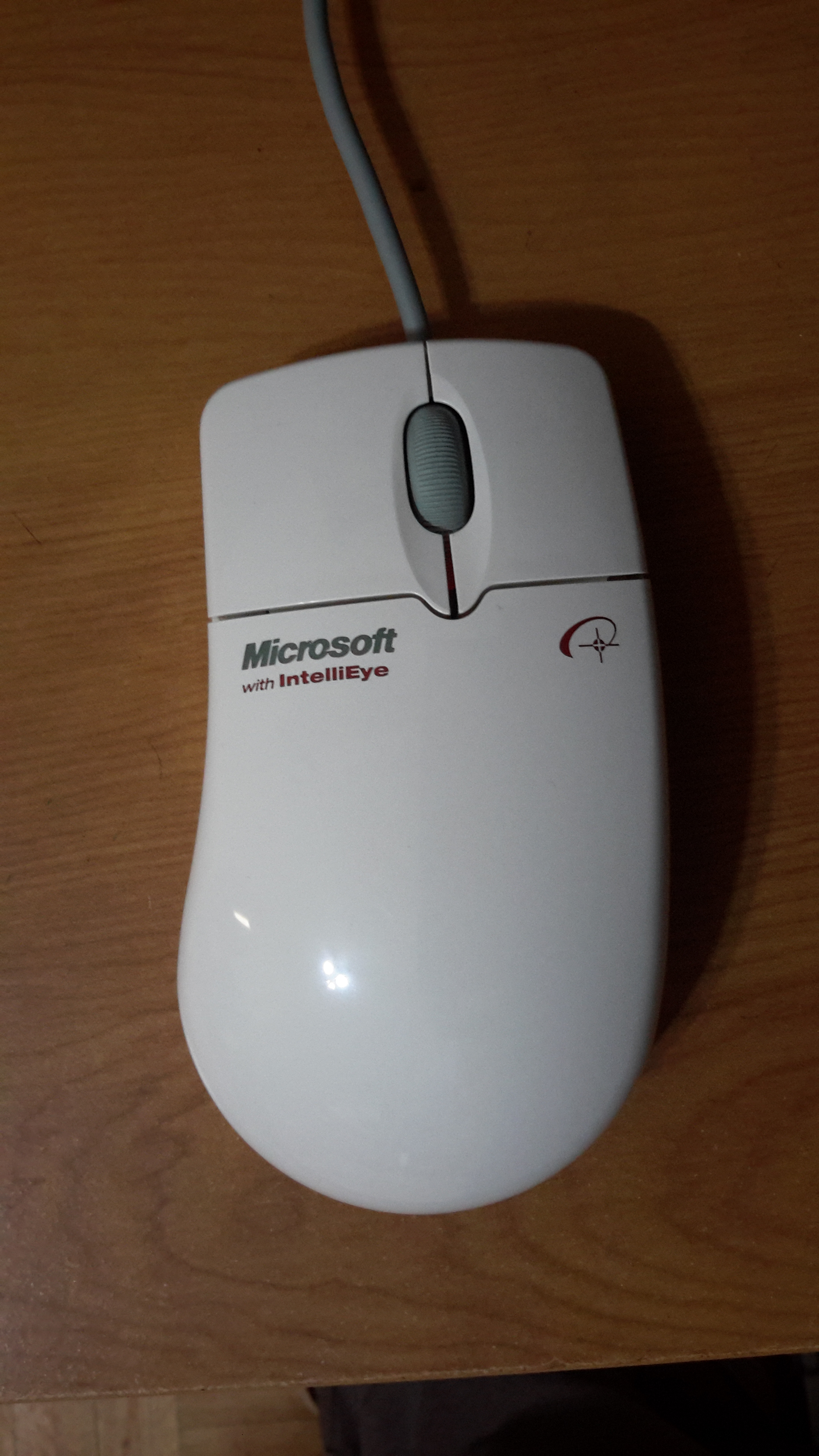
Microsoft IntelliEye mouse

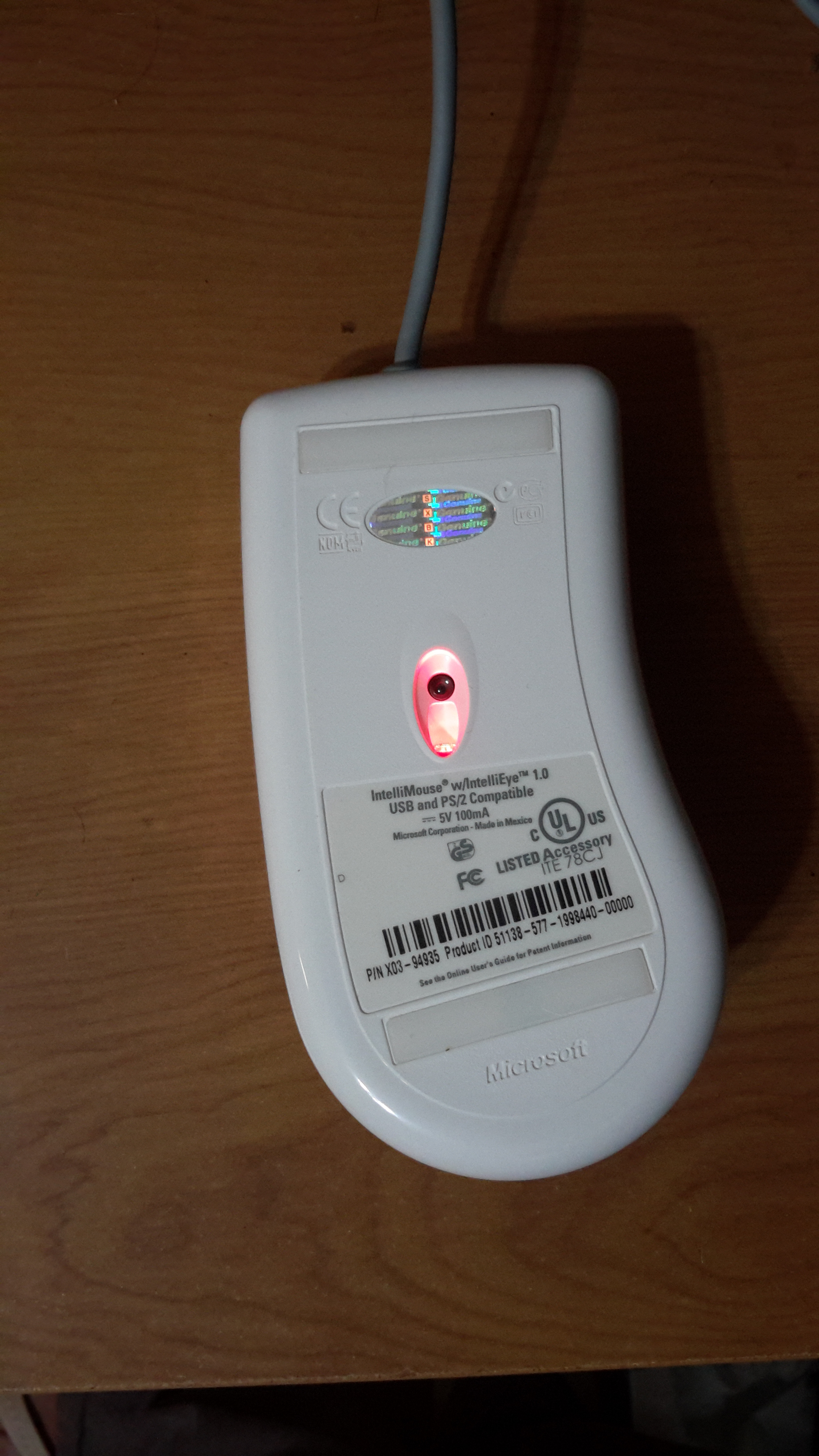
Microsoft IntelliEye mouse

Note: Version 8.0 and above dropped PS/2 support for the following list. As even adapters cannot assist, Microsoft keeps version 7.1 as an offered download for users who still own mice with PS/2 connectors (instead of USB).

- Arc
- Arc Touch
- Basic Optical Mouse
- Basic Optical Mouse v2.0
- Comfort Optical Mouse 3000
- Comfort Optical Mouse 500 v2.0
- IntelliMouse
- IntelliMouse Explorer 2.0
- IntelliMouse Explorer 3.0
- IntelliMouse Explorer 4.0
- IntelliMouse Explorer for Bluetooth
- IntelliMouse Optical
- Explorer Mouse
- Explorer Touch Mouse
- Explorer Mini Mouse
- Laser Mouse 6000
- Mobile Memory Mouse 8000
- Mobile Optical Mouse
- Natural Wireless Laser Mouse 6000
- Notebook Optical Mouse
- Notebook Optical Mouse 3000
- Optical Mouse
- Optical Mouse by Starck
- Sculpt Comfort Mouse
- Sculpt Mobile Mouse
- Sculpt Touch Mouse
- SideWinder Mouse
- SideWinder x8 Mouse (for gaming)
- Standard Wireless Mouse
- Touch Mouse
- Trackball Explorer
- Trackball Optical
- Wheel Mouse
- Wheel Mouse Optical
- Wireless IntelliMouse Explorer 2.0
- Wireless IntelliMouse Explorer for Bluetooth
- Wireless IntelliMouse Explorer with Fingerprint Reader
- Wireless Laser Mouse 5000
- Wireless Laser Mouse 6000
- Wireless Laser Mouse 6000 v2.0
- Wireless Laser Mouse 7000
- Wireless Laser Mouse 8000
- Wireless Notebook Laser Mouse 6000
- Wireless Notebook Laser Mouse 7000
- Wireless Notebook Optical Mouse
- Wireless Notebook Optical Mouse 3000
- Wireless Notebook Optical Mouse 4000
- Wireless Notebook Presenter Mouse 8000
- Wireless Notebook Mouse 5000
- Wireless Optical Mouse 2.0
- Wireless Optical Mouse 2000
- Wireless Optical Mouse 5000 (also Wireless IntelliMouse Explorer 2.0)
