= Surface Pro X =

2-in-1 detachable tablet computer developed by Microsoft

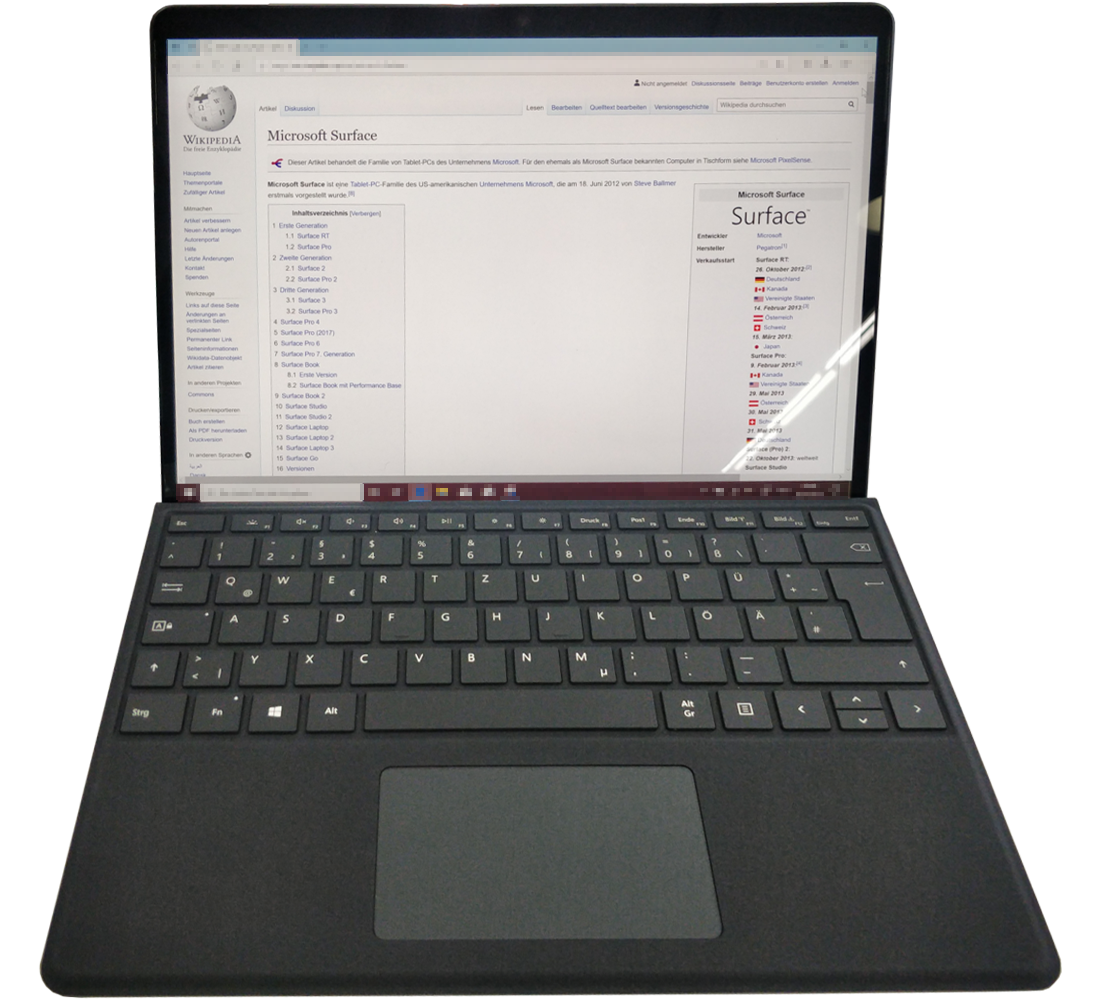
- Developer: Microsoft
- Product family: Microsoft Surface
- Type: 2-in-1 detachable
- Generation: Seventh
- Released: SQ1: 2 October 2019; 6 years ago SQ2: 1 October 2020; 5 years ago
- Availability: SQ1: 22 October 2019; 6 years ago SQ2: 13 October 2020; 5 years ago
- Introductory price: SQ1": USD 900 to 1,900; SQ2": USD 1,300 to 1,900
- Operating system: Windows 10 (upgradeable to Windows 11)
- CPU: Microsoft SQ1 or SQ2 (co-developed with Qualcomm)
- Memory: 8 or 16 GB LPDDR4x RAM
- Storage: 512 GB, 256 GB, 128 GB removable SSD
- Removable storage: none
- Display: 13-inch touchscreen PixelSense display 2880 × 1920, 267 PPI; 3:2 aspect ratio, 450 nits
- Graphics: SQ1: Adreno 685 GPU; SQ2: Adreno 690 GPU
- Sound: 2W stereo speakers Dolby Audio
- Input: Built in: touchscreen, ambient light sensor, accelerometer, gyroscope, magnetometer Sold separately: keyboard, touchpad, mouse, stylus pen, Surface Dial
- Camera: Front: 5 MP, 1080p HD; Rear: 10 MP, 4K
- Touchpad: Available with Surface Type Cover accessory
- Connectivity: WiFi 5, Bluetooth 5, USB 3, LTE A, GPS
- Online services: Microsoft Store, OneDrive
- Dimensions: 287 mm x 208 mm x 7.3 mm (11.3 in x 8.2 in x 0.28 in)
- Weight: 774 g (1.706 lb) tablet only
- Predecessor: Surface 2
- Successor: Surface Pro 9
- Website: www.surface.com

The Surface Pro X is a 2-in-1 detachable tablet computer developed by Microsoft. It was developed alongside and was announced on 2 October 2019 alongside the Surface Pro 7 and Surface Laptop 3. Updated hardware was announced alongside Surface Laptop Go and Surface accessories on October 1, 2020 and September 22, 2021. The device starts at $899.99 USD / £849.99.

The Surface Pro X comes with a Microsoft SQ1 or SQ2 ARM processor, which the company claimed has three times the performance of an x86 MacBook Air, whilst also having a 13-hour battery life. This is due to the increased power efficiency of ARM processors compared to traditional x86 processors. Microsoft has previously used ARM processors in the discontinued Surface RT and Windows Phone devices.

Microsoft now offers a Wifi-only version of the device as announced at their Surface Event on September 22, 2021.

== Configuration ==
The Surface Pro X starts at US$899.99 / £849.99 for the least expensive model with 8 GB RAM and 128 GB storage.

The device can be bought with either 8 GB or 16 GB RAM. Users can also choose between 128 GB, 256 GB and 512 GB of storage.

Surface Pro X configuration options
Price tier in USD		CPU	GPU	RAM	Internal storage	LTE	Color	
Consumer	Business	CPU	GPU	RAM	Internal storage	LTE	Color	
$900		Microsoft SQ1	Adreno 685	8 GB	128 GB	No	P	
$1,000	$1,100	Microsoft SQ1	Adreno 685	8 GB	128 GB	Yes		B
$1,100		Microsoft SQ1	Adreno 685	8 GB	256 GB	No	P	
$1,300	$1,400	Microsoft SQ1	Adreno 685	8 GB	256 GB	Yes		B
$1,500	$1,600	Microsoft SQ1	Adreno 685	16 GB	256 GB	Yes		B
$1,800	$1,900	Microsoft SQ1	Adreno 685	16 GB	512 GB	Yes		B
$1,300		Microsoft SQ2	Adreno 690	16 GB	256 GB	No	P	
$1,500	$1,600	Microsoft SQ2	Adreno 690	16 GB	256 GB	Yes	P	B
$1,500		Microsoft SQ2	Adreno 690	16 GB	512 GB	No	P	
$1,800	$1,900	Microsoft SQ2	Adreno 690	16 GB	512 GB	Yes	P	B

Platinum Black

== Hardware and design ==
The Surface Pro X is the 7th addition to Surface Pro lineup alongside the Surface Pro 7. Microsoft markets the tablet as a "go-anywhere, do-anything PC". Microsoft claims the Surface Pro X's battery can last up to 13 hours of use.

Compared to the Surface Pro 6, the Surface Pro X is slimmer and has rounder edges featuring a matte black finish construction in platinum and black finish. The device contains 2 USB-C ports, an eSIM and a SIM card slot for LTE, a removable SSD, and the Surface Connect port for charging. There are no microSD card slot and headphone jack on the tablet, requiring its users to use dongles and USB-C or Bluetooth enabled headphones.

The device's screen is a 13-inch touchscreen display, with smaller bezels compared to other Surface Pro devices.

The device uses Microsoft SQ1 or SQ2 ARM processors co-developed by Qualcomm, based on the Snapdragon 8cx Gen 1 and Gen 2 processors respectively. A Qualcomm X24 LTE modem is also featured in the device for both processors.

== Software ==
The Surface Pro X comes pre-installed with an ARM-based version of Windows 10, which supports ARM32 and ARM64 UWP and desktop apps from the Microsoft Store or from other sources. x86 applications can be run through emulation, addressing a major issue of Windows RT. Emulation of x64 applications is an upcoming feature that is already available to Windows Insiders for testing. In addition, Hyper-V can be installed on ARM64 devices such as the Surface Pro X running the Pro or Enterprise editions of Windows 10.

== Timeline ==
Timeline of Surface devices
Sources: Microsoft Devices Blog Microsoft Surface Store Microsoft Surface for Business store
