= Surface Laptop 2 =

2018 laptop by Microsoft

- Developer: Microsoft
- Product family: Microsoft Surface
- Type: Laptop
- Generation: Second
- Released: 2 October 2018; 7 years ago
- Availability: 16 October 2018; 7 years ago
- Introductory price: USD999 to 2,699
- Operating system: Windows 10 Home; Upgradable to Windows 11 Home
- CPU: Intel Core i5 8250U or Intel Core i7 8650U
- Memory: 16 GB or 8 GB LPDDR3 RAM
- Storage: 1 TB, 512 GB, 256 GB, 128 GB 110.6 MBps SSD
- Removable storage: none
- Display: 13.5 inch touchscreen PixelSense Display; 2256 x 1504 (201 ppi); 3:2 Aspect Ratio; Gorilla Glass 3
- Graphics: Intel UHD Graphics 620
- Sound: Omnisonic Speakers with Dolby Audio, 3.5 mm headphone jack, Stereo microphones
- Input: Built in: touchscreen, ambient light sensor, keyboard, touchpad Sold Separately: mouse, stylus pen, Surface Dial
- Camera: 720p HD camera
- Touchpad: Built in
- Connectivity: WiFi 5, Bluetooth 4.1
- Online services: Microsoft Store, OneDrive
- Dimensions: 308.1 x 223.27 x 14.48 mm (12.13 x 8.79 x .57 in)
- Weight: i5": 1,252 grams (2.760 lb) i7": 1,283 grams (2.829 lb)
- Predecessor: Surface Laptop
- Successor: Surface Laptop 3
- Related: Surface
- Website: www.surface.com

The Surface Laptop 2 is a Surface-series laptop produced by Microsoft. Unveiled at an event in New York City on 2 October 2018, and alongside the Surface Pro 6 released on 16 October 2018, it succeeds the Surface Laptop, released in June 2017. While maintaining a design similar to the original design of its predecessor, the Surface Laptop 2 has improved hardware specifications compared to it, an increased number of storage options and a new matte black color.

== Configuration ==
The Surface Laptop 2 is available in four colors: Black, Platinum, Burgundy, and Cobalt Blue. Intel Core i5 and the Intel Core i7 processors are available. RAM is configurable to 8 GB or 16 GB while storage capacity is offered in 128 GB, 256 GB, 512 GB and 1 TB configurations. The laptop has no option for expandable storage.

Surface Laptop 2 Configuration Options
Price Tier in USD		CPU	GPU	RAM	SSD	Color
Consumer	Business	CPU	GPU	RAM	SSD	Color
$999	$1,199	Intel Core i5-8250U	Intel UHD Graphics 620	8 GB	128 GB	P
$1,299	$1,399	Intel Core i5-8250U	Intel UHD Graphics 620	8 GB	256 GB	P B C B
$1,599	$1,649	Intel Core i7-8650U	Intel UHD Graphics 620	8 GB	256 GB	P B C B
$2,199	$2,249	Intel Core i7-8650U	Intel UHD Graphics 620	16 GB	512 GB	P B C B
$2,699	$2,749	Intel Core i7-8650U	Intel UHD Graphics 620	16 GB	1 TB	P B C B

Platinum Black Cobalt Blue Burgundy

== Features ==
The default operating system is Windows 10 Home. The display is a 13.5 inch 2256 x 1504 pixel 10-point touch screen with a front 720p HD camera. The laptop weighs 2.76 pounds for the Intel Core i5 models and 2.83 pounds for the Intel Core i7 model.

== Hardware ==
The Surface Laptop 2 includes three different ports on the left hand side of the laptop, a USB-A port, a mini-display port, and the headphone jack. The right side of the device contains a magnetic surface connector port. The Surface Laptop 2 was criticized for failing to include a USB-C port and Thunderbolt 3 port.

This laptop has two omnisonic speakers, a stereo, some microphones to collect audio, and a headset jack that is located on the left-hand side of the computer.

The battery life on this laptop has about 14 hours and 20 minutes, with a charging time approximately 3-5 hours.

== Timeline ==
Timeline of Surface devices
Sources: Microsoft Devices Blog Microsoft Surface Store Microsoft Surface for Business store

Preceded by Surface Laptop	Surface Laptop 2; 2nd generation	Succeeded by Surface Laptop 3
