= Surface Laptop =

Line of laptops developed by Microsoft running Microsoft Windows operating system

The Surface Laptop is a line of laptops marketed by Microsoft, as a sub-brand of their Surface devices.

== Models ==
Several models have been produced:

- Surface Laptop (1st generation), released in 2018
- Surface Laptop 2, released in 2018
- Surface Laptop 3, released in 2019
- Surface Laptop 4, released in 2021
- Surface Laptop 5, released in 2022
- Surface Laptop 6, released in April 2024
- Surface Laptop 7 (7th generation), released in June 2024

(first release with the Qualcomm Snapdragon X ARM CPUs)

- Surface Laptop 8 (8th generation), released in May 2026
- Surface Laptop 13 inch, released in May 2025
- Surface Laptop Go, marketed as an affordable version, released in 2020
- Surface Laptop Studio, a 2-in-1 version, released in 2021
- Surface Laptop SE, an education-oriented version, released in 2021

(shipping with Windows 11 SE)

== Timeline ==
Timeline of Surface devices
Sources: Microsoft Devices Blog Microsoft Surface Store Microsoft Surface for Business store
