= Surface Laptop Go 2 =

Laptop by Microsoft

- Developer: Microsoft
- Product family: Microsoft Surface
- Type: Laptop
- Generation: Second
- Released: 1 June 2022; 4 years ago
- Availability: 2022
- Introductory price: USD 600 to 1100
- Operating system: Windows 11
- CPU: Intel Core i5-1135G7
- Memory: 16 GB, 8 GB, 4 GB RAM
- Storage: 256 GB or 128 GB SSD
- Removable storage: none
- Display: 12.4 inch Touchscreen; PixelSense Display; 1536 x 1024, 148 ppi 3:2 Aspect Ratio
- Graphics: Intel Iris Xe Graphics
- Sound: Omnisonic Speakers with Dolby Audio, 3.5 mm headphone jack, Dual far-field Studio Mics
- Input: Built in: touchscreen, ambient light sensor, keyboard, touchpad, fingerprint reader Sold Separately: mouse, stylus pen
- Camera: 720p HD f2.0 camera
- Touchpad: Built-in
- Connectivity: WiFi 6, Bluetooth 5.1, USB C, USB A
- Online services: Microsoft Store, OneDrive
- Dimensions: 278.2 mm x 206.2 mm x 15.7 mm (10.95 in x 8.12 in x 0.62 in)
- Weight: 1,125 grams (2.480 lb)
- Predecessor: Surface Laptop Go
- Successor: Surface Laptop Go 3
- Website: www.surface.com

The Surface Laptop Go 2 is an upgrade to the Surface Laptop Go. It is a mid-range portable computer with adequate capabilities for everyday PC use that is part of the company's Surface line of personal computing devices. The newer 11th-gen Intel Core i5-1135G7 processor and slightly enhanced 128 GB basic storage will be the laptop's key highlights. Microsoft announced the Surface Laptop Go 2 in a new Sage color on June 1, 2022.

== Configuration ==
Surface Laptop Go Configuration Options
Price Tier in USD		CPU	GPU	RAM	Internal storage	Color	Fingerprint
Consumer	Business	CPU	GPU	RAM	Internal storage	Color	Fingerprint
$600	$700	Intel Core i5-1135G7	Intel Iris Xe	4 GB	128 GB NVMe SSD	P	No
$700	$800	Intel Core i5-1135G7	Intel Iris Xe	8 GB	128 GB NVMe SSD	P B S S	Yes
$800	$900	Intel Core i5-1135G7	Intel Iris Xe	8 GB	256 GB NVMe SSD	P B S S	Yes
	$1,100	Intel Core i5-1135G7	Intel Iris Xe	16 GB	256 GB NVMe SSD	P B S S	Yes

Sage Platinum Ice Blue Sandstone

== Features ==
- 11th Generation Intel® Core™ 1135G7 Processor
- Intel Iris Xe GPU.
- Preinstalled Operating system: Windows 11 Home
- 12.4-inch PixelSense 1536 x 1024 (148 ppi) display with a 3:2 aspect ratio
- Up to 13.5 hours battery life
- Metal finish
- Full size keyboard, with 1.3 mm of travel
- Fingerprint Power Button with One Touch sign-in through Windows Hello (select models only)
- New Sage color option

== Hardware ==
The Surface Laptop Go 2 is an update to the Surface Laptop Go. Made with an aluminum top and a polycarbonate composite resin system with glass fiber and 30% postconsumer recycled content base. Claimed to have an improved battery life of up to 13.5 hours. A new Sage color is added to the device in addition to Platinum, Ice Blue and Sandstone colors.

It still has a 12.4-inch "PixelSense" Display at 1536 × 1024 using a 3:2 aspect ratio with 10-point touch but without Surface Pen support.

The Surface Laptop Go 2 uses an eleventh-generation Intel Core i5 processor with Intel Iris Xe Graphics. The base model of the device will now have a 4 GB RAM and 128 GB of storage, up from 64 GB of the previous model.

The device has 1 USB-C and 1 USB-A port, alongside a headphone jack and a Surface Connect port for charging. The laptop also has Wi-Fi 6 and Bluetooth 5.

Select models have a fingerprint power button with Windows Hello.

== Software ==
Surface Laptop Go models ship with a pre-installed 64-bit version of Windows 11 Home and a 30-day trial of Microsoft Office 365. Business models come pre-installed with Windows 11 Pro.

== Timeline ==
Timeline of Surface devices
Sources: Microsoft Devices Blog Microsoft Surface Store Microsoft Surface for Business store

Preceded by Surface Laptop Go	Surface Laptop Go 2; 2nd generation	Succeeded by Surface Laptop Go 3
