= Surface Laptop Go =

2020 Microsoft laptop model

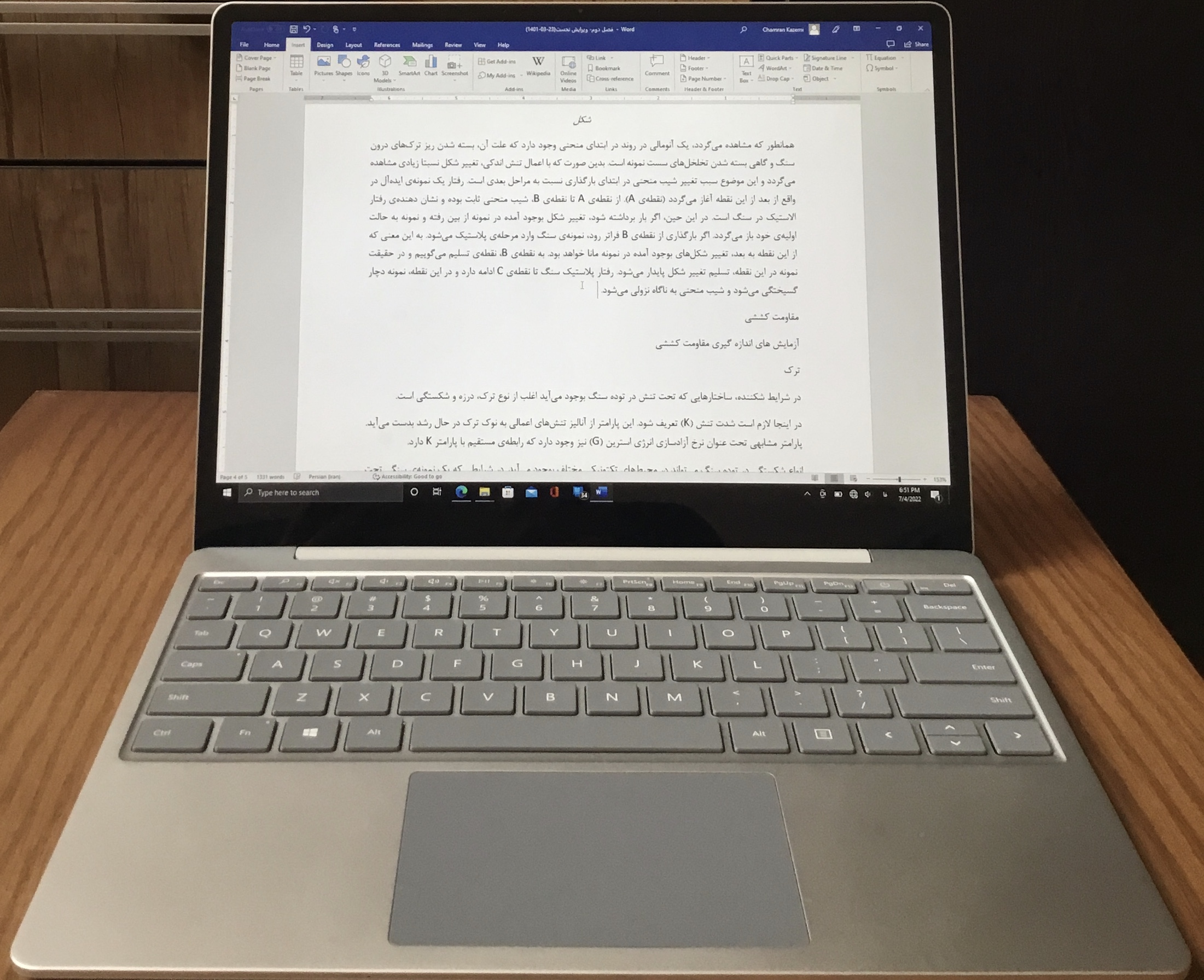
- Surface Laptop Go
- Developer: Microsoft
- Product family: Microsoft Surface
- Type: Laptop
- Generation: First
- Released: 1 October 2020; 5 years ago
- Introductory price: $550-1100
- Operating system: Windows 10 S (upgradable to Windows 11)
- CPU: Intel Core i5-1035G1
- Memory: 16 GB or 8 GB or 4 GB RAM
- Storage: eMMC: 64 GB; SSD: 128 GB, 256 GB
- Removable storage: none
- Display: 12.4 inch Touchscreen; PixelSense Display; 1536 x 1024, (148 ppi); 3:2 Aspect Ratio
- Graphics: Intel UHD Graphics
- Sound: Omnisonic Speakers with Dolby Audio, 3.5 mm headphone jack, Dual far-field Studio Mics
- Input: Built in: touchscreen, ambient light sensor, keyboard, touchpad, fingerprint reader Sold Separately: mouse, stylus pen
- Camera: 720p HD camera
- Touchpad: Built-in
- Connectivity: WiFi 6, Bluetooth 5, USB 3
- Online services: Microsoft Store, OneDrive
- Dimensions: 278.18 mm x 205.67 mm x 15.69 mm (10.95 in x 8.10 in x 0.62 in)
- Weight: 1,110 grams (2.45 lb)
- Successor: Surface Laptop Go 2
- Related: Surface Laptop SE
- Website: www.surface.com

The Surface Laptop Go is a portable computer introduced by Microsoft in October 2020. The laptop was designed to be a more affordable option of Microsoft's Surface lineup of Personal computing devices. It was announced alongside updated Surface Pro X models and several Surface accessories on 1 October 2020. Retail availability began on 13 October 2020.

== Hardware ==
The Surface Laptop Go was available in 3 colors: Platinum, Ice Blue and Sandstone.

The screen features a 12.4-inch display at 1536 × 1024 in a 3:2 aspect ratio, with a 10-point touchscreen and no support for the Surface Pen.

The Surface Laptop Go features a 10th-generation Ice Lake Intel Core i5 processor paired with integrated Intel UHD Graphics.

In terms of ports, the Surface Go contains 1 USB-C and 1 USB-A port, alongside a headphone jack and a Surface Connect port for charging. The laptop also has support for Wi-Fi 6 and Bluetooth 5.

== Software ==
All Surface Laptop Go models come preinstalled with Windows 10 Home in S Mode and a 30-day trial of Microsoft Office 365. Business models come preinstalled with Windows 10 Pro.

== Configuration ==
Surface Laptop Go Configuration Options
Price Tier in USD		CPU	GPU	RAM	Internal Storage	Color	Fingerprint
Consumer	Business	CPU	GPU	RAM	Internal Storage	Color	Fingerprint
$550		Intel Core i5-1035G1	Intel UHD Graphics	4 GB	64 GB eMMC	P	No
$700	$800	Intel Core i5-1035G1	Intel UHD Graphics	8 GB	128 GB NVMe SSD	P B S	Yes
$900	$1,000	Intel Core i5-1035G1	Intel UHD Graphics	8 GB	256 GB NVMe SSD	P B S	Yes
	$1,100	Intel Core i5-1035G1	Intel UHD Graphics	16 GB	256 GB NVMe SSD	P B S	Yes

Platinum Ice Blue Sandstone

== Timeline ==
Timeline of Surface devices
Sources: Microsoft Devices Blog Microsoft Surface Store Microsoft Surface for Business store

Preceded by None	Surface Laptop Go; 1st generation With: Surface Pro X	Succeeded by Surface Laptop Go 2
