= Surface Laptop 3 =

Laptop by Microsoft

- Developer: Microsoft
- Product family: Microsoft Surface
- Type: Laptop
- Generation: Third
- Released: 2 October 2019; 6 years ago
- Availability: 22 October 2019; 6 years ago
- Introductory price: 15.0": USD1,200 - 2,800; 13.5": USD1,000 - 2,400
- Operating system: Windows 10 Home; Upgradable to Windows 11 Home
- CPU: 15.0": AMD Ryzen 5 3580U or AMD Ryzen 7 3780U; 13.5" and 15.0" for business: Intel Core i5 1035G7 or Intel Core i7 1065G7
- Memory: 15.0": 8 GB, 16 GB, 32 GB RAM; 13.5": 8 GB, 16 GB RAM
- Storage: 15.0": 1 TB, 512 GB, 256 GB, 128 GB; 13.5": 1 TB, 512 GB, 256 GB, 128 GB
- Removable storage: SSD is not user removable. SSD is only removable by skilled technician following Microsoft provided instructions.
- Display: PixelSense Touchscreen; 3:2 Aspect Ratio; 15.0": 2496 x 1664, 201 PPI; 13.5": 2256 x 1504, (201 ppi)
- Graphics: 15.0": Radeon Vega 9 or Radeon RX Vega 11; 13.5" and 15.0" for business: Intel Iris Plus
- Sound: Omnisonic Speakers with Dolby Audio, 3.5 mm headphone jack, dual far-field studio mics
- Input: Built in: touchscreen, ambient light sensor, keyboard, touchpad Sold Separately: mouse, stylus pen, Surface Dial
- Camera: 720p HD f2.0 camera
- Touchpad: Built in
- Connectivity: Bluetooth 5, USB C 15.0": WiFi 5; 13.5": WiFi 6
- Online services: Microsoft Store, OneDrive
- Dimensions: 15.0": 339.5 x 244 x 14.69 mm (13.4 x 9.6 x 0.57 in); 13.5": 308 x 223 x 14.5 mm (12.1 x 8.8 x 0.57 in)
- Weight: 15.0": 1,542 grams (3.400 lb); Platinum & Matte Black; 13.5": 1,288 grams (2.840 lb); Sandstone & Matte Black; 1,265 grams (2.789 lb); Cobalt Blue & Platinum
- Predecessor: Surface Laptop 2
- Successor: Surface Laptop 4
- Related: Surface
- Website: www.surface.com

The Surface Laptop 3 is a laptop computer developed by Microsoft. It is the third generation of Surface Laptop and was unveiled alongside the Surface Pro 7 and Surface Pro X on an event on 2 October 2019. It succeeds the Surface Laptop 2 that was released in October 2018.

Surface Laptop 3 keeps the same form and design, but with an addition of a USB Type-C port, improved battery life, hidden antenna lines, and an AMD CPU for the 15-inch model—a first for a Surface device.

Microsoft now offers an aluminum keyboard deck as an option for some models alongside the traditional Alcantara material covering. The 15-inch models are only available with an aluminum keyboard deck.

The device comes installed with Windows 10 Home but a free upgrade to Windows 11 is available.

The 13.5-inch model's display is the same resolution as previous generations, but the new 15-inch model features increased display resolution to maintain high pixel density. The 13.5-inch model comes with a 2256 x 1504 resolution and the 15-inch model comes with a 2496 x 1664 resolution. Both models have a 3:2 aspect ratio and pixel density of 201 pixels per inch (ppi).

The Surface Laptop 3 13.5-inch model starts at $1,000 and goes up to $2,400. The 15-inch model starts at $1,200 and goes up to $2,800.

== Configuration ==
Surface Laptop 3 Configuration Options
Price Tier in USD		Size	CPU	GPU	RAM	Internal Storage	Color
Consumer	Business	Size	CPU	GPU	RAM	Internal Storage	Color
$1,000	$1,100	13.5"	Intel Core i5-1035G7	Intel Iris Plus Graphics (64 EU) (GT2 @ 1.05 GHz)	8 GB	128 GB	A
$1,300	$1,400	13.5"	Intel Core i5-1035G7	Intel Iris Plus Graphics (64 EU) (GT2 @ 1.05 GHz)	8 GB	256 GB	S B C A
$1,500	$1,600	13.5"	Intel Core i5-1035G7	Intel Iris Plus Graphics (64 EU) (GT2 @ 1.05 GHz)	16 GB	256 GB	S B C A
$1,600	$1,700	13.5"	Intel Core i7-1065G7	Intel Iris Plus Graphics (64 EU) (GT2 @ 1.1 GHz)	16 GB	256 GB	S B C A
$2,000	$2,100	13.5"	Intel Core i7-1065G7	Intel Iris Plus Graphics (64 EU) (GT2 @ 1.1 GHz)	16 GB	512 GB	S B C A
$2,400	$2,500	13.5"	Intel Core i7-1065G7	Intel Iris Plus Graphics (64 EU) (GT2 @ 1.1 GHz)	16 GB	1 TB	S B C A
$1,200		15"	AMD Ryzen 5 3580U	Radeon Vega 9	8 GB	128 GB	P
$1,500		15"	AMD Ryzen 5 3580U	Radeon Vega 9	8 GB	256 GB	B P
$1,700		15"	AMD Ryzen 5 3580U	Radeon Vega 9	16 GB	256 GB	B P
$2,100		15"	AMD Ryzen 7 3780U	Radeon RX Vega 11	16 GB	512 GB	B P
$2,800		15"	AMD Ryzen 7 3780U	Radeon RX Vega 11	32 GB	1 TB	B P
	$1,300	15"	Intel Core i5-1035G7	Intel Iris Plus Graphics (64 EU) (GT2 @ 1.05GHz)	8 GB	128 GB	P
	$1,600	15"	Intel Core i5-1035G7	Intel Iris Plus Graphics (64 EU) (GT2 @ 1.05GHz)	8 GB	256 GB	B P
	$1,700	15"	Intel Core i5-1035G7	Intel Iris Plus Graphics (64 EU) (GT2 @ 1.05GHz)	16 GB	256 GB	B P
	$1,800	15"	Intel Core i7-1065G7	Intel Iris Plus Graphics (64 EU) (GT2 @ 1.1 GHz)	16 GB	256 GB	B P
	$2,200	15"	Intel Core i7-1065G7	Intel Iris Plus Graphics (64 EU) (GT2 @ 1.1 GHz)	16 GB	512 GB	B P
	$2,900	15"	Intel Core i7-1065G7	Intel Iris Plus Graphics (64 EU) (GT2 @ 1.1 GHz)	32 GB	1 TB	B

S | Sandstone Metal B | Black Metal P | Platinum Metal C | Cobalt Blue Alcantara A | Platinum Alcantara
Surface Laptop 3 for consumer comes preloaded with Windows 10 Home
Surface Laptop 3 for business comes preloaded with Windows 10 Pro

== Features ==
- Windows Hello face authentication via integrated near infrared (IR) camera
- 10th Gen Intel Core i5 or i7 processor for the 13.5-inch model
- AMD Ryzen 5 or 7 Surface Edition processor for the 15-inch model
- Memory options are 32 GB, 16 GB and 8 GB
- Storage options are 1 TB, 512 GB, 256 GB and 128 GB
- A 3.5 mm headphone jack, USB-C (3.2 Gen 2 with USB-PD 3.0) and USB-A (3.2 Gen 2) ports
- All configurations can be upgraded to Windows 10 Pro for an additional $50. (Business models come pre-installed with Windows 10 Pro)
- Up to 11.5 hours battery life for either model
- Factory calibrated IPS-type sRGB display with 400 nits peak brightness and 1400:1 contrast ratio

== Hardware ==
The Surface Laptop 3 is the 3rd addition to Surface Laptop lineup. The Surface Laptop 3 is aimed toward business professionals and the enterprise market.

The device is available with either a 13.5-inch or 15-inch display touchscreen. The device features a full-body aluminum alloy construction alongside an Alcantara material on the keyboard deck. Between the 13.5" or 15" screen size options, while the resolutions differ, they both have the same pixel density of 201 pixels per inch.

The Surface Laptop 3 features quad core Intel Core i7 1065G7 or an Intel Core i5 1035G7 CPU for the 13.5-inch consumer and business model and 15-inch business model. Custom Surface Edition AMD Ryzen 5 3580U and Ryzen 7 3780U CPUs for the 15-inch consumer model are offered. The Intel CPU variants come with an Intel Iris Plus G7 integrated GPU for both the 13.5-inch consumer and 15-inch business models, and a custom Surface Edition AMD Radeon Vega or AMD Radeon RX Vega GPU for the 15-inch consumer model.

The device contains a USB-A port and a USB-C port with power delivery and a Surface Connect port. In addition to the 720p camera, a near IR sensor is included for Windows Hello face authentication.

The keyboard's key travel is reduced to 1.3 mm, compared to 1.5 mm in the previous generation. Its touchpad is 20 percent larger than the previous generation as well.

Like all the other Surface devices, the Surface Laptop 3 supports digital pen input.

The laptop doesn't have a microSD or SD card slot; however, the company made the device's SSD upgradable and easier to access. Microsoft also made it possible to remove the keyboard plate to get all of the computer's internals making it easier to repair.

== Software ==
Surface Laptop 3 models ship with a pre-installed 64-bit version of Windows 10 Home and a 30-day trial of Office 365. Users can opt for a Pro version of the OS for a fee. Windows 10 comes pre-installed with Mail, Calendar, People, Xbox, Photos, Movies and TV, Groove Music, Your Phone, Office and Edge.

== Timeline ==
Timeline of Surface devices
Sources: Microsoft Devices Blog Microsoft Surface Store Microsoft Surface for Business store

Preceded by Surface Laptop 2	Surface Laptop 3; 3rd generation With: Surface Pro 7, Surface Pro X	Succeeded by Surface Laptop 4
