= Microsoft Surface =

Series of personal computers, tablets and interactive whiteboards by Microsoft

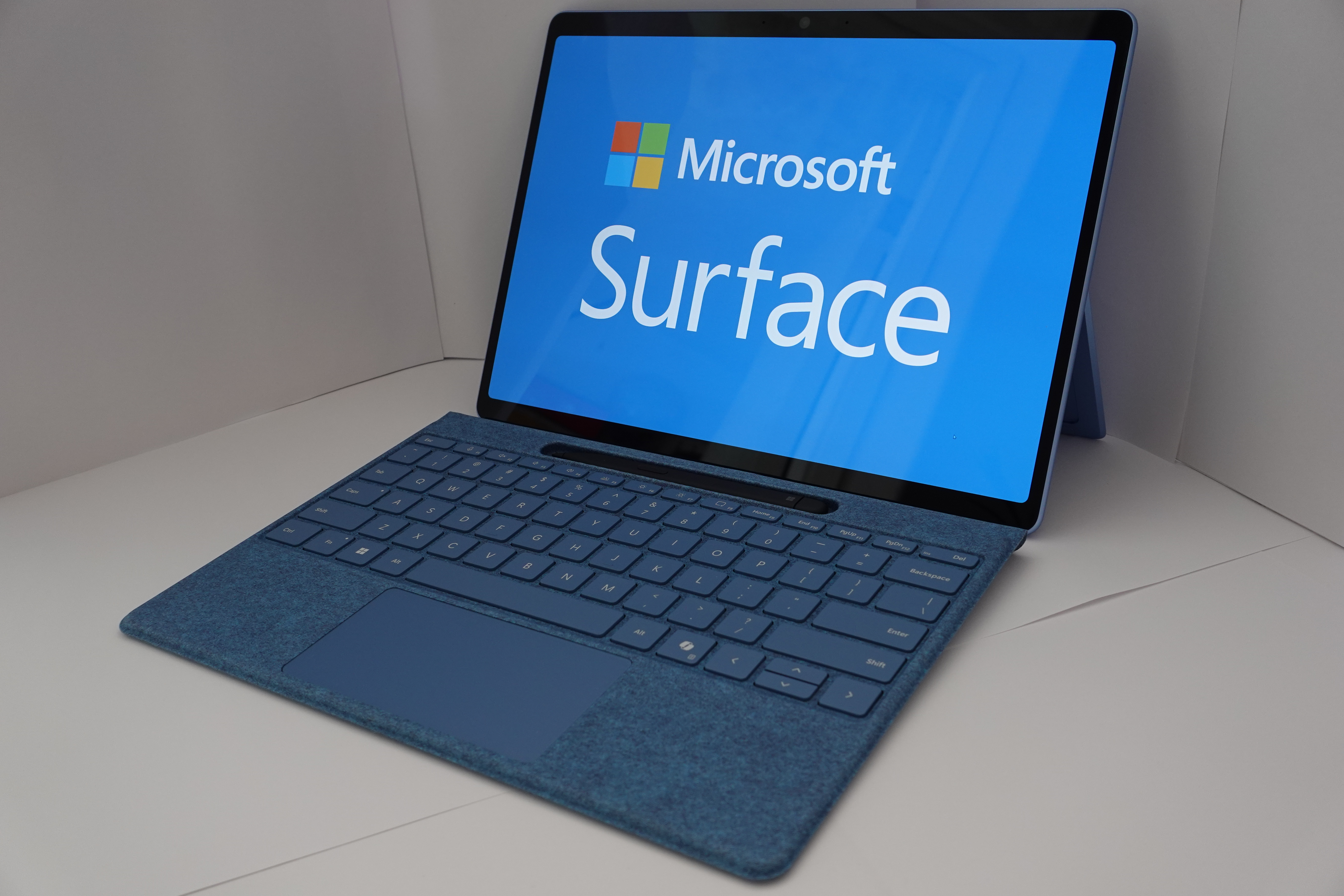
- Surface Pro 11 with sapphire keyboard
- Developer: Microsoft
- Manufacturer: Pegatron
- Type: Personal computers, mobile devices, whiteboards
- Lifespan: 2012–present
- Operating system: Windows; Android (Surface Duo only)
- Website: www.microsoft.com/surface/

Microsoft Surface is a family of touchscreen-based personal computer, tablet, and interactive whiteboard hardware products designed and developed by Microsoft. The majority of them run the Windows operating system and use Intel processors; the earliest models (Surface RT and Surface 2) ran on ARM32, and a select handful of models starting with the Surface Pro X in 2019 run on ARM64.

The Surface line has served as Microsoft's umbrella brand for PCs since it was first introduced in 2012, marking the company's first entry in building its own branded computers. It has since expanded to comprise several generations of hybrid tablets, 2-in-1 detachable notebooks, a convertible desktop all-in-one, an interactive whiteboard, and various accessories, many with unique form factors. Microsoft is also consolidating all other Microsoft hardware products such as PC accessories under the Surface brand as of 2023.

== Devices ==
The Surface family currently features five main lines of devices:

- The Surface Pro line of hybrid tablets, slightly larger and more powerful than Go, with similar, optional detachable keyboard accessories and optional digital pen.
- The Surface Laptop, a classic notebook with a 13-inch, 13.8-inch or 15-inch touchscreen.
- The Surface Laptop Ultra, a classic notebook.
- The Surface Hub, a touch screen interactive whiteboard designed for collaboration.
- The Surface RTX Spark Dev Box, a desktop PC targeted at developers.

There have been 9 other lines, however these lines have been deprecated:

- The Surface line of tabletop computers, which featured PixelSense technology to recognize objects placed on the screen.
- The Surface Go line of hybrid tablets, with optional detachable keyboard accessories and optional digital pen.
- The Surface Laptop, a classic notebook with a 13.5-inch or 15-inch touchscreen aimed at students.
- The Surface Laptop Go, marketed as a more affordable alternative to the brand's premium laptops.
- The Surface Laptop SE, an entry-level laptop targeted at the education market, designed to be easier to repair by service partners for on-site repair.
- The Surface Book, a notebook with a detachable tablet screen. Some variants of the base include discrete graphics.
- The Surface Laptop Studio, a notebook with dual-pivoting screen to change into tablet mode.
- The Surface Studio, a 28-inch all-in-one desktop that adjusts into a digital drafting table with stylus and on-screen Surface Dial support.
- The Surface Duo, a dual-screen foldable Android phone.

Legend:	Unsupported	Discontinued	Supported	Current	Upcoming

Operating system support
Model		Release		Support		
Line	Surface	OS	Date	Final OS	Ended	Lifespan
Surface	Surface RT	Windows RT	October 26, 2012	Windows RT 8.1 Update 3	January 10, 2023	10 years, 2 months
Surface	Surface 2	Windows RT 8.1	October 22, 2013	Windows RT 8.1 Update 3	January 10, 2023	9 years, 2 months
Surface	Surface 3	Windows 8.1 Update	May 5, 2015	Windows 10 version 22H2	October 14, 2025	10 years, 5 months
Surface Go	Surface Go	Windows 10 version 1709	August 2, 2018	Windows 10 version 22H2	October 14, 2025	7 years, 2 months
Surface Go	Surface Go 2	Windows 10 version 1809	May 12, 2020	Latest Windows (Note: Windows 11 version 25H2.)	Active	6 years, 6 months
Surface Go	Surface Go 3	Windows 11 version 21H2	October 5, 2021	Latest Windows	Active	5 years, 1 month
Surface Go	Surface Go 4	Windows 11 version 22H2	October 3, 2023	Latest Windows	Active	3 years, 1 month
Surface Pro	Surface Pro	Windows 8	February 9, 2013	Windows 10 version 22H2	October 14, 2025	12 years, 8 months
Surface Pro	Surface Pro 2	Windows 8.1	October 22, 2013	Windows 10 version 22H2	October 14, 2025	11 years, 11 months
Surface Pro	Surface Pro 3	Windows 8.1 Update	June 20, 2014	Windows 10 version 22H2	October 14, 2025	11 years, 3 months
Surface Pro	Surface Pro 4	Windows 10 version 1507	October 26, 2015	Windows 10 version 22H2	October 14, 2025	9 years, 11 months
Surface Pro	Surface Pro (2017)	Windows 10 version 1703	June 15, 2017	Windows 10 version 22H2	October 14, 2025	8 years, 3 months
Surface Pro	Surface Pro 6	Windows 10 version 1709	October 16, 2018	Latest Windows	Active	8 years, 1 month
Surface Pro	Surface Pro 7	Windows 10 version 1809	October 22, 2019	Latest Windows	Active	7 years
Surface Pro	Surface Pro X (1st)	Windows 10 version 1903	November 5, 2019	Latest Windows	Active	7 years
Surface Pro	Surface Pro X (2nd)	Windows 10 version 2004	October 13, 2020	Latest Windows	Active	6 years, 1 month
Surface Pro	Surface Pro 7+	Windows 10 version 2004	January 11, 2021	Latest Windows	Active	5 years, 10 months
Surface Pro	Surface Pro 8	Windows 11 version 21H2	October 5, 2021	Latest Windows	Active	5 years, 1 month
Surface Pro	Surface Pro 9	Windows 11 version 22H2	October 25, 2022	Latest Windows	Active	4 years
Surface Pro	Surface Pro 10	Windows 11 version 23H2	April 9, 2024	Latest Windows	Active	2 years, 7 months
Surface Pro	Surface Pro 11th Edition	Windows 11 version 24H2	June 18, 2024	Latest Windows	Active	2 years, 4 months
Surface Pro	Surface Pro 12th Edition	Windows 11 version 25H2	June 16, 2026	Latest Windows	Active	5 months
Surface Laptop SE	Surface Laptop SE	Windows 11 SE version 21H2	February 4, 2022	Windows 11 SE version 24H2	October 13, 2026	4 years, 8 months
Surface Laptop Go	Surface Laptop Go	Windows 10 version 1909	October 27, 2020	Latest Windows	Active	6 years
Surface Laptop Go	Surface Laptop Go 2	Windows 11 version 21H2	June 1, 2022	Latest Windows	Active	4 years, 5 months
Surface Laptop Go	Surface Laptop Go 3	Windows 11 version 22H2	October 3, 2023	Latest Windows	Active	3 years, 1 month
Surface Laptop	Surface Laptop	Windows 10 version 1703	June 15, 2017	Windows 10 version 22H2	October 14, 2025	8 years, 3 months
Surface Laptop	Surface Laptop 2	Windows 10 version 1709	October 16, 2018	Latest Windows	Active	8 years, 1 month
Surface Laptop	Surface Laptop 3	Windows 10 version 1809	October 22, 2019	Latest Windows	Active	7 years
Surface Laptop	Surface Laptop 4	Windows 10 version 20H2	April 20, 2021	Latest Windows	Active	5 years, 6 months
Surface Laptop	Surface Laptop 5	Windows 11 version 22H2	October 25, 2022	Latest Windows	Active	4 years
Surface Laptop	Surface Laptop 6	Windows 11 version 23H2	April 9, 2024	Latest Windows	Active	2 years, 7 months
Surface Laptop	Surface Laptop 7th Edition	Windows 11 version 24H2	June 18, 2024	Latest Windows	Active	2 years, 5 months
Surface Laptop	Surface Laptop 8th Edition	Windows 11 version 25H2	May 19, 2026	Latest Windows	Active	5 months
Surface Book	Surface Book	Windows 10 version 1507	October 26, 2015	Windows 10 version 22H2	October 14, 2025	9 years, 11 months
Surface Book	Surface Book with Performance Base	Windows 10 version 1607	November 10, 2016	Windows 10 version 22H2	October 14, 2025	8 years, 11 months
Surface Book	Surface Book 2 (Note: The Surface Book 2 variants with Intel Core 8th generation processors support Windows 11 and later.)	Windows 10 version 1703	November 16, 2017	Windows 10 version 22H2	October 14, 2025	7 years, 11 months
Surface Book	Surface Book 2	Windows 10 version 1703	November 16, 2017	Latest Windows	Active	9 years, 1 month
Surface Book	Surface Book 3	Windows 10 version 1903	May 21, 2020	Latest Windows	Active	6 years, 5 months
Surface Laptop Studio	Surface Laptop Studio	Windows 11 version 21H2	October 5, 2021	Latest Windows	Active	5 years, 1 month
Surface Laptop Studio	Surface Laptop Studio 2	Windows 11 version 22H2	October 3, 2023	Latest Windows	Active	3 years, 1 month
Surface Laptop Ultra	Surface Laptop Ultra	Windows 11 version 26H1	October 16, 2026	Latest Windows	Active	1 month
Surface Studio	Surface Studio	Windows 10 version 1607	December 15, 2016	Windows 10 version 22H2	October 14, 2025	8 years, 9 months
Surface Studio	Surface Studio 2	Windows 10 version 1803	October 2, 2018	Latest Windows	Active	8 years, 1 month
Surface Studio	Surface Studio 2+	Windows 11 version 22H2	October 25, 2022	Latest Windows	Active	4 years
Surface Hub	Surface Hub	Windows 10 Team version 1507	June 1, 2015	Windows 10 Team version 22H2	October 14, 2025	10 years, 4 months
Surface Hub	Surface Hub 2S	Windows 10 Team version 1703	April 17, 2019	Latest Windows	Active	7 years, 7 months
Surface Hub	Surface Hub 3	Windows 11 version 22H2	October 3, 2023	Latest Windows	Active	3 years, 1 month
Surface Duo	Surface Duo	Android 10	September 10, 2020	Android 12.1	September 10, 2023	3 years
Surface Duo	Surface Duo 2	Android 11	October 5, 2021	Android 12.1	October 21, 2024	3 years

== History ==
Microsoft first announced Surface at an event on June 18, 2012, presented by former CEO Steve Ballmer in Milk Studios Los Angeles. Surface was the first major initiative by Microsoft to integrate its Windows operating system with its own hardware, and is the first PC designed and distributed solely by Microsoft. Panos Panay was the general manager of the team that developed the Surface.

Sinofsky initially stated that pricing for the first Surface would be comparable to other ARM devices and pricing for Surface Pro would be comparable to current ultrabooks. Later, Ballmer noted the "sweet spot" for the bulk of the PC market was $300 to $800. Microsoft revealed the pricing and began accepting preorders for the 2012 Surface tablet, on October 16, 2012 "for delivery by 10/26". The device was launched alongside the general availability of Windows 8 on October 26, 2012. Surface Pro became available the following year on February 9, 2013. The devices were initially available only at Microsoft Stores retail and online, but availability was later expanded into other vendors.

In November 2012, Ballmer described the distribution approach to Surface as "modest" and on November 29 of that year, Microsoft revealed the pricing for the 64 GB and 128 GB versions the Surface Pro. The tablet would go on sale on February 9, 2013, in the United States and Canada. A launch event was set to be held on February 8, 2013, but was cancelled at the last minute due to the February 2013 nor'easter. The 128GB version of the tablet sold out on the same day as its release. Though there was less demand for the 64GB version because of the much smaller available storage capacity, supplies of the lower cost unit were almost as tight.

The following year, on March 30, 2015, it announced the Surface 3, a lower-cost and more compact version of the Surface Pro 3. On September 8, 2015, Microsoft announced the "Surface Enterprise Initiative", a partnership between Accenture, Avanade, Dell Inc., and HP, to "enable more customers to enjoy the benefits of Windows 10." As part of the partnership, Dell would resell Surface Pro products through its business and enterprise channels, and offer its existing enterprise services (including Pro Support, warranty, and Configuration and Deployment) for Surface Pro devices it sells.

Microsoft announced the Surface Pro 4 and the Surface Book, a hybrid laptop, at Microsoft October 2015 Event in New York on October 10, 2015. Microsoft began shipping Surface Hub devices on March 25, 2016. In June 2016, Microsoft confirmed production of the Surface 3 would stop in December of that year. No replacement product has been announced. Reports suggested this may have been a consequence of Intel discontinuing the Broxton iteration of the Atom processor. On October 26, 2016, at Microsoft's event, a Surface Studio and Surface Book with Performance Base was announced. A wheel accessory, the Surface Dial, was announced as well, and became available on November 10, 2016.

Immediately following the announcement of the Surface Laptop at the #MicrosoftEDU event on May 2, 2017, and the Microsoft Build 2017 developer conference, Microsoft announced the fifth-generation Surface Pro at a special event in Shanghai on May 23, 2017.

On May 15, 2018, Microsoft announced the Surface Hub 2, featuring a new rotating hinge and the ability to link multiple Hubs together.

In June 2018, Microsoft announced the Surface Go, a $400 Surface tablet with a 10-inch screen and 64 or 128 GB of storage.

On October 2, 2019, Microsoft announced the Surface Pro 7, the Surface Laptop 3, and the Surface Pro X. Both the Surface Pro 7 and the Surface Laptop 3 come with a USB-C port. The Surface Pro X comes with the Microsoft SQ1 ARM processor. Microsoft also teased two dual-screen devices: the Surface Neo, a dual screen tablet originally planned to run Windows 10X; and the Surface Duo, a dual screen mobile phone that runs Android. Both products were initially announced to be released in 2020, though the Surface Neo was delayed indefinitely. The Surface Duo was released on September 10, 2020.

On September 22, 2021, Microsoft announced the Surface Pro 8, the Surface Duo 2 and the Surface Laptop Studio.

=== Processor ===
The first-generation Surface uses a quad-core Nvidia Tegra 3 of the ARM architecture, as opposed to the Intel x64 architecture and therefore shipped with Windows RT, which was written for the ARM architecture. The second-generation Surface 2 added an Nvidia Tegra 4. The architecture limited Surface and Surface 2 to only apps from the Windows Store recompiled for ARM. With the release of the Surface 3, Microsoft switched the Surface line to the Intel x64 architecture, the same architecture found in the Surface Pro line. Surface 3 uses the Braswell Atom X7 processor.

The 2019 Surface Pro X uses a custom ARM64 SoC, the Microsoft SQ1. A revised model uses an updated version of the SoC, known as Microsoft SQ2.

=== Storage ===
The Surface devices are released in six internal storage capacities: 32, 64, 128, 256, 512 GB and 1 TB. With the release of the third generation, the 32 GB model was discontinued. All models except the Surface Pro X also feature a microSDXC card slot, located behind the kickstand, which allow for the use of memory cards up to 200 GB.

Microsoft's Surface/Storage site revealed that the 32 GB Surface RT has approximately 16 GB of user-available storage and the 64 GB Surface RT has roughly 45 GB.

=== External color and kickstand ===
The exterior of the earlier generations of Surface (2012 tablet, Pro, and Pro 2) is made of VaporMg magnesium alloy giving a semi-glossy black durable finish that Microsoft calls "dark titanium". Originally, the design of Surface was to feature a full "VaporMg" design, but the production models ditched this and went with a "VaporMg" coating. Later devices moved towards a matte gray finish showing the actual magnesium color through the semi-transparent top coating. The Surface Laptop is available in four colors: platinum, graphite gold, burgundy, and cobalt blue.

The Surface and Surface Pro lines feature a kickstand which flips out from the back of the device to prop it up, allowing the device to be stood up at an angle hands-free. According to Microsoft, this is great for watching movies, video chatting, and typing documents. According to some reviewers, this kickstand is uncomfortable to use in one's lap and means the device won't fit on shallow desks. The first generation has a kickstand that can be set to a 22 degrees angle position. The second generation added a 55 degrees angle position which according to Microsoft makes the device more comfortable to type on the lap. The Surface 3 features three angle positions: 22, 44, and 60 degrees. The Surface Pro 3 is the first device to have a continuous kickstand that can be set at any angles between 22 and 150 degrees. With the fifth-generation Surface Pro, Microsoft added an additional 15 degrees of rotation to the hinge bringing the widest possible angle to 165 degrees, or what Microsoft calls "Studio Mode".

=== Surface Book ===
On October 6, 2015, Microsoft unveiled the Surface Book, a 2-in-1 detachable with a mechanically attached, durable hardware keyboard. It became the first Surface device to be marketed as a laptop instead of a tablet. The device has a teardrop design.

The Surface Book has what Microsoft calls a "dynamic fulcrum hinge" which allows the device to support the heavier notebook/screen portion.

On October 26, 2016, Microsoft unveiled an additional configuration, called the Surface Book with Performance Base, which has an upgraded processor and a longer battery life.

The Surface Book 2 was announced on October 17, 2017, introducing an upgraded ceramic hinge for stability, and lighter overall weight distribution. A 15-inch model was added to the line. On May 6, 2020, the Surface Book 3 was announced, featuring 10th-generation Intel Core processors, improved battery life, and faster SSD storage.

=== Surface Laptop ===
On May 3, 2017, Microsoft unveiled the Surface Laptop, a non-detachable version of the Surface Book claiming to have the thinnest touch-enabled LCD panel of its kind. Its permanently attached hardware keyboard comes in four colors and uses the same kind of fabric as the Type Cover accessories for the tablets. The device comes with the newly announced Windows 10 S operating system, which enables faster boot times at the expense of the ability to download and install programs from the web instead of the Microsoft Store. Users can switch to a fully enabled version of Windows 10 for free.

=== Surface Studio ===
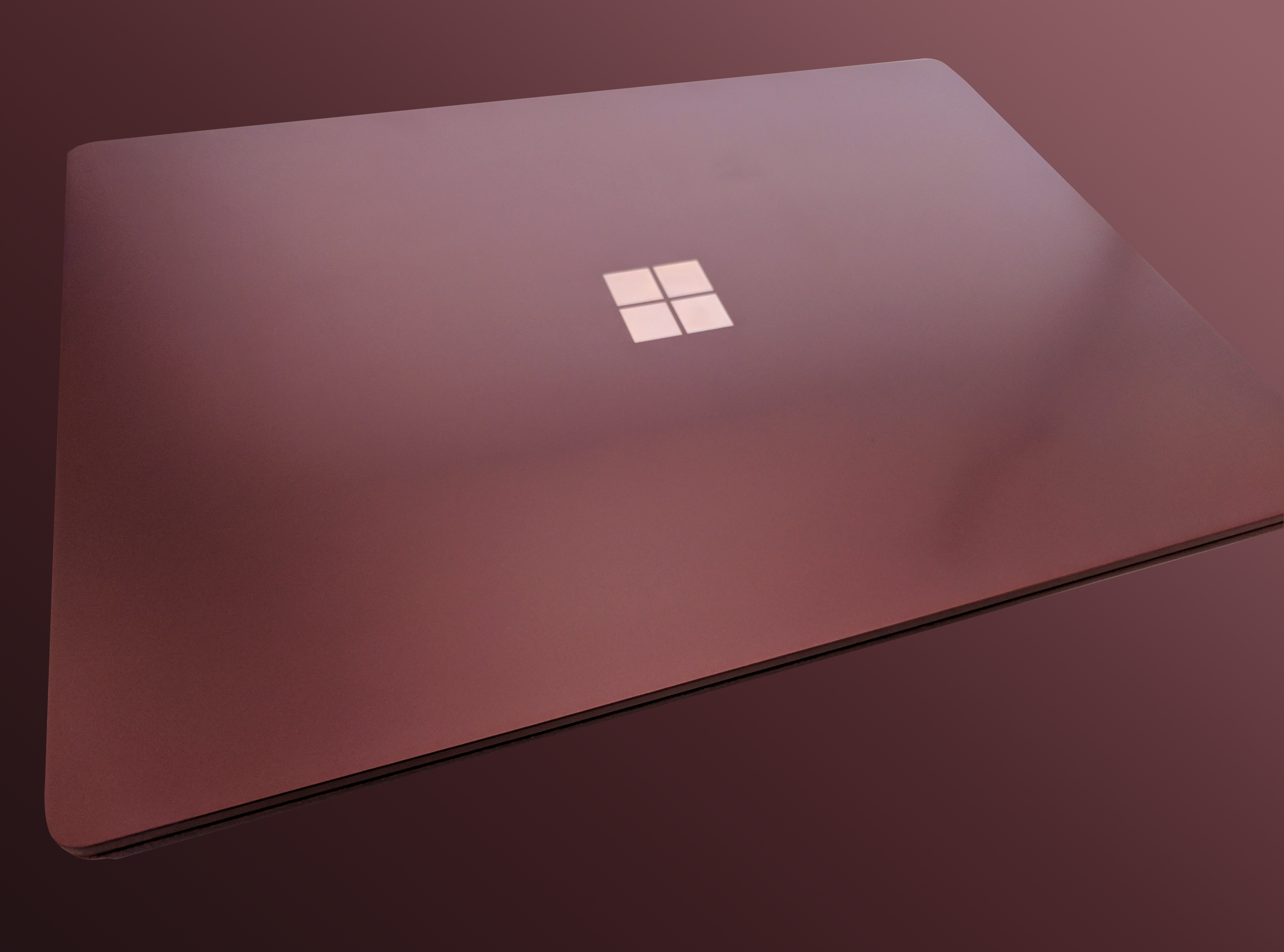
Surface Laptop in Burgundy color

On October 26, 2016, Microsoft announced a 28-inch all-in-one desktop PC, the Surface Studio. The device claims to have the thinnest LCD ever made in an all-in-one PC. All its components, including the processor and a surround-sound system, are located in a compact base on which the screen is mounted upon via a flexible, four-point hinge. The design allows the screen to fold down to a 20-degree angle for physical interaction with the user. It comes with the Windows 10 Anniversary Update preinstalled, but is optimized for the Windows 10 Creators Update released in April 2017.

=== Surface Hub ===
On January 21, 2015, Microsoft introduced a new device category under the Surface family: the Surface Hub. It is an 84-inch 120 Hz 4K or 55-inch 1080p multi-touch, multi-pen, wall-mounted all-in-one device, aimed for collaboration and videoconferencing use of businesses. The device runs a variant of the Windows 10 operating system.

=== Surface Neo ===
On October 2, 2019, Microsoft unveiled the Surface Neo, an upcoming dual-screen tablet. The device is a folio with two 9-inch displays that can be used in various configurations ("postures"), including a laptop-like form where a Bluetooth keyboard is attached to the bottom screen. Depending on its position, the remainder of the touchscreen can be used for different features; the keyboard can be attached at the top to use the bottom as a touchpad, or at the bottom to display a special area above the keyboard (the "wonderbar"), which can house tools such as emojis. The device was originally planned to run a new Windows 10 edition known as Windows 10X, which was designed specifically for this class of devices. However, Microsoft eventually cancelled Windows 10X. At this time, it is unknown which version of Windows it will run.

=== Surface Duo ===
Alongside the Surface Neo, Microsoft also unveiled the Surface Duo, a dual-screen Android mobile device with a similar design. Unlike the Surface Neo, the Surface Duo did release in September 2020 with 6GB of RAM and 128/256GB of storage. It initially shipped with Android 10 and uses Microsoft Launcher as the default launcher. Both Surface Duo models hold two screens, one screen per side. The Surface Duo can be folded in many ways, such as tabletop, tent, or single-screen. The first Duo has a selfie camera on the right side with a flashlight. A second model, the Surface Duo 2, got released in 2021 with 8GB of RAM and a back camera on one side.

== Software ==
The original Surface and Surface 2 models use Windows RT, a special version of Windows 8 designed for devices with ARM processors and cannot be upgraded to Windows 10. However, there were several major updates made available after its initial release that include Windows RT 8.1, RT 8.1 Update 1, RT 8.1 August update, and RT 8.1 Update 3. These older, ARM-based models of Surface are not compatible with Windows 10, but received several new features including a new Start menu similar to that found in early preview builds of Windows 10.

From Surface Pro 4 and onward, all Surface devices support Windows Hello facial biometric authentication out of the box through its cameras and IR-sensors. The Surface Pro 3 can utilize the Surface Pro 4 Type Cover with Fingerprint ID to gain Windows Hello support.

=== Specialized software ===
Prior to the release of Windows 10, on Surface Pro 3 Microsoft made the Surface Hub app available, which allowed the adjustment of Pen pressure sensitivity and button functions. The Surface Hub app was renamed "Surface" following the launch of the Surface Hub device. Additionally, toggles to control sound quality and to disable the capacitive Windows button on the Surface 3 and Pro 3 devices were included.

With Surface Pro 3 and the Surface Pen based on N-Trig technology, Microsoft added the capability to launch OneNote from the lock screen without logging in by pressing the purple button at the top of the pen. Microsoft added sections to Windows 10 settings that have the ability to control the functions of the buttons on the Surface Pen. One such function is to launch OneNote with the press of the top button of the Surface Pro 4 pen. With the introduction of the Surface Dial, Microsoft added a Wheel settings section to the Settings app in Windows 10 under Devices. The Windows 10 Anniversary Update added the ability to adjust the shortcuts of each of the Pen's buttons performed.

Most Surface devices are include a Microsoft self-R&D UEFI firmware.

== Accessories ==
There are two main versions of the keyboard covers that connect via the Accessory Spine on the Surface tablets. The now discontinued Touch Cover, and the ever-evolving Type Cover. They feature a multi-touch touchpad, and a full QWERTY keyboard (with pre-defined action keys in place of the function row, though the function row is still accessible via the function button). The covers are made of various soft-touch materials and connect to the Surface with a polycarbonate spine with pogo pins.

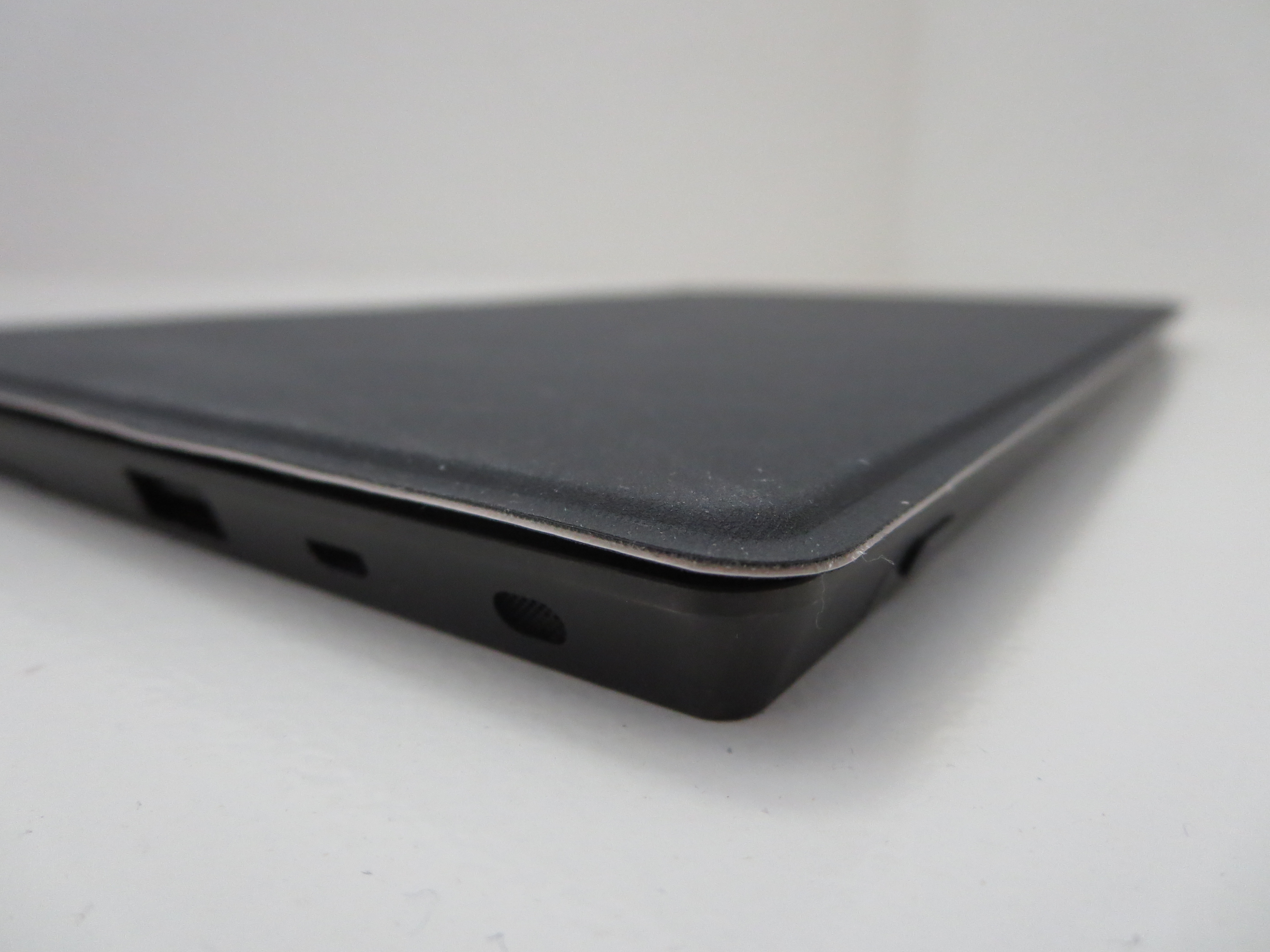
The 2012 Surface tablet with Touch Cover 2 attached

Microsoft sells the Surface Pen, an active-digitizer pen, separate of Surface, but included it in all Surface tablets until the fifth-generation Surface Pro where it was removed. The Surface Pen is designed to integrate with inking capabilities on Windows including OneNote.

=== Remix project ===
In 2013, Microsoft announced that they were going to design other covers for the Surface accessory spine (code named "blades") based on the Touch Cover 2's sensors. The only product that was shipped was the Surface Music Cover and the Surface Music Kit app.

== Model comparison ==
=== Surface and Surface Go line ===
Model		Surface	Surface 2	Surface 3	Surface Go	Surface Go 2	Surface Go 3	Surface Go 4
Date released		October 26, 2012	October 22, 2013	May 5, 2015	August 2, 2018	May 12, 2020	October 5, 2021	October 3, 2023
Operating system	Initial	Windows RT	Windows RT 8.1	Windows 8.1; Update	Windows 10 version 1803	Windows 10 version 1909	Windows 11 version 21H2	Windows 11 version 22H2
Operating system	Latest supported	Windows RT 8.1; Update 3		Windows 10 version 22H2		Latest Windows version		
Operating system	Edition	Core		Home/Pro				Pro
Driver support until		April 11, 2017	April 10, 2018	November 13, 2021	August 2, 2022	December 30, 2024	October 5, 2027	September 21, 2029
Dimensions mm (in)	Height	171.9 (6.77)	172.4 (6.79)	186.9 (7.36)	175 (6.9)			
Dimensions mm (in)	Width	274.5 (10.81)	274.5 (10.81)	266.9 (10.51)	245 (9.6)			
Dimensions mm (in)	Depth	9.3 (0.37)	8.8 (0.35)	8.6 (0.34)	8.3 (0.33)			
Weight g (lb)		680 (1.50)		622 (1.371)	522 (1.151)	544 (1.199); 553 (1.219) (LTE)	544 (1.199)	521 (1.149)
RAM (GB)		2		2/4	4/8			8
Internal storage (GB)		32/64		64/128	64/128/256			
Expandable storage (GB)		MicroSDXC, up to 200 GB						
Display	Size	26.9 cm (10.6 in)		27.4 cm (10.8 in)	25.4 cm (10.0 in)	26.67 cm (10.50 in)		
Display	Aspect ratio	16:9		3:2				
Display	Resolution	1366 × 768	1920 × 1080	1920 × 1280	1800 × 1200	1920 × 1280		
Display	PPI	148	208	214	217	220		
Display	Refresh Rate	60 Hz						
Display	Technology	LCD						
CPU	Generation	Nvidia Tegra 3	Nvidia Tegra 4	Intel Silvermont; Cherry Trail	Intel 7th gen Kaby Lake-Y	Intel 8th gen Amber Lake-Y	Intel 10th gen Amber Lake-Y	Intel 12th gen Alder Lake-N
CPU	Model(s)	Nvidia Tegra 3	Nvidia Tegra 4	Atom x7-Z8700	Pentium Gold 4415Y	Pentium Gold 4425Y; Core m3-8100Y	Pentium Gold 6500Y; Core i3-10100Y	N200
CPU	iGPU	Geforce ULP		Intel HD Graphics	Intel HD Graphics 615	Intel UHD Graphics 615		
Battery	Capacity (Wh)	31.5 Wh		28 Wh	26.12 Wh	24 Wh	28 Wh	29 Wh
Battery	Type	Li-Ion						
Cameras	Front camera	3.5 MP			5.0 MP			
Cameras	Front camera	HD (1280 × 720) video	FHD (1920 × 1080) video					
Cameras	Rear camera	5.0 MP		8.0 MP				
Cameras	Rear camera	HD (1280 × 720) video	FHD (1920 × 1080) video					
Sensors	Ambient light	Yes						
Sensors	Accelerometer	Yes						
Sensors	Gyroscope	Yes						
Sensors	GPS	No	Cellular version					No
Sensors	Magnetometer	Yes						
Sensors	Proximity	No	Yes					
Sensors	Microphones	2			1			
Connectors	A/V	3.5 mm audio socket						
Connectors	A/V	Micro HDMI		Mini DisplayPort	via USB-C			
Connectors	USB	1 × USB-A 2.0	1 × USB-A 3.0		1 × USB-C 3.1 Gen 1			
Radios	Wi-Fi	Wi-Fi 4		Wi-Fi 5		Wi-Fi 6		
Radios	Bluetooth	4.0			4.1	5.0		5.1
Radios	Cellular	No	Optional					No
Surface Pen support		Wacom active pen		Microsoft Pen Protocol				
TPM		Yes	No	Yes	Yes (2.0)			
Surface Dial support		No		Partial (no on-screen support, Windows 10 upgrade)	Partial (no on-screen support)			
Integrated Windows Hello support		No			Yes (via backlit IR camera)			

=== Surface Pro line ===
Model		Pro	Pro 2	Pro 3	Pro 4	Pro (2017)	Pro 6	Pro 7	Pro X	Pro X 2nd gen	Pro 7+	Pro 8	Pro 9	Pro 10	Pro (11th)
Date released		February 9, 2013	October 22, 2013	June 20, 2014	October 26, 2015	June 15, 2017	October 16, 2018	October 22, 2019	October 22, 2019	October 13, 2020	January 11, 2021	October 5, 2021	October 19, 2022	April 9, 2024	June 18, 2024
Operating system	Initial	Windows 8	Windows 8.1	Windows 8.1; Update	Windows 10 version 1507	Windows 10 version 1607	Windows 10 version 1803	Windows 10 version 1903		Windows 10 version 2004		Windows 11 version 21H2	Windows 11 version 22H2	Windows 11 version 23H2	Windows 11 version 24H2
Operating system	Latest supported	Windows 10 version 22H2					Latest Windows version								
Operating system	Edition	Pro					Home/Pro				Pro	Home/Pro		Pro	Home (Snapdragon); Pro (Intel Core)
Driver support until		April 11, 2017	April 10, 2018	November 13, 2021		January 15, 2024	June 30, 2023	February 28, 2024	August 10, 2025		January 15, 2027	October 5, 2027	October 25, 2028		
Dimensions mm (in)	Height	172.9 (6.81)		201.3 (7.93)	201.4 (7.93)				208 (8.2)		201.4 (7.93)	208 (8.2)			
Dimensions mm (in)	Width	274.5 (10.81)		292 (11.5)	292.1 (11.50)				287 (11.3)		292.1 (11.50)	287 (11.3)			
Dimensions mm (in)	Depth	13.46 (0.530)		9.1 (0.36)	8.4 (0.33)	8.5 (0.33)			7.3 (0.29)		8.5 (0.33)	9.3 (0.37)	9.4 (0.37)	9.3 (0.37)	
Weight g (lb)		910 (2.01)	900 (2.0)	800 (1.8)	766 (1.689) (m3); 786 (1.733) (i5); 786 (1.733) (i7)	768 (1.693) (m3); 770 (1.70) (i5); 784 (1.728) (i7)	775 (1.709) (i5); 792 (1.746) (i7)	775 (1.709) (i3); 776 (1.711) (i5); 790 (1.74) (i7)	774 (1.706)		770 (1.70) (i3, i5); 796 (1.755) (i5 LTE); 784 (1.728) (i7)	889 (1.960)	891 (1.964)	879 (1.938)	895 (1.973)
RAM	Capacity (GB)	4	4/8		4/8/16		8/16	4/8/16	8/16		8/16/32			8/16/32/64	16/32
RAM	Speed (MHz)	1600				1866		3733	4266		3733	4266			
RAM	Type	DDR3	LPDDR3					LPDDR4X						LPDDR5X	
Internal storage	Size (GB)	64/128/256	64/128/256/512		128/256/512/1024				128/256/512		128/256/512/1024			256/512/1024	
Internal storage	Type	mSATA SSD			PCIe NVME SSD										
Internal storage	Removable	Internal socket				No, soldered			Yes			128/256 only	Yes		
Expandable storage (GB)		MicroSDXC, up to 200 GB							—N/a		MicroSDXC, up to 200 GB	—N/a			
Display	Size	27.0 cm (10.6 in)		30.0 cm (11.8 in)	31.2 cm (12.3 in)				33.0 cm (13.0 in)		31.2 cm (12.3 in)	33.0 cm (13.0 in)			
Display	Aspect ratio	16:9		3:2											
Display	Resolution	1920 × 1080 pixels		2160 × 1440 pixels	2736 × 1824 pixels				2880 × 1920 pixels		2736 × 1824 pixels	2880 × 1920 pixels			
Display	PPI	208		214	267										
Display	Refresh Rate	60 Hz										120 Hz			
Display	Technology	LCD													LCD; OLED
Processor	Generation	Intel 3rd gen Ivy Bridge	Intel 4th gen Haswell		Intel 6th gen Skylake	Intel 7th gen Kaby Lake	Intel 8th gen Kaby Lake R	Intel 10th gen Ice Lake	Kryo 495		Intel 11th gen Tiger Lake		Intel 12th gen Alder Lake; Kryo	Intel 1st gen Meteor Lake	Qualcomm; Snapdragon X Intel 2nd gen Lunar Lake
Processor	Model(s)	i5-3317U	i5-4200U i5-4300U	i3-4020Y i5-4300U i7-4650U	m3-6Y30 i5-6300U i7-6650U	m3-7Y30 i5-7300U i7-7660U	i5-8250U i5-8350U i7-8650U	i3-1005G1 i5-1035G4 i7-1065G7	Microsoft SQ1	Microsoft SQ2	i3-1115G4 i5-1135G7 i7-1165G7	i3-1115G4 i5-1135G7 i5-1145G7 i7-1185G7	i5-1235U i5-1245U i7-1255U i7-1265U; Microsoft SQ3	5-135U; 7-165U	X Plus; X Elite; 5-236V; 5-238V; 7-266V; 7-268V
Processor	iGPU	Gen7	Gen7.5		Gen9	Gen9.5		Gen11	Adreno 685	Adreno 690	Xe		Xe; Adreno 730	Arc 1st gen	Adreno 750; Arc 2nd gen
Processor	NPU	—N/a												Yes	
Battery	Capacity (Wh)	42.0 Wh		42.2 Wh	38.2 Wh	45.0 Wh		43.2 Wh	38.2 Wh		50.4 Wh	51.5 Wh	50.2 Wh	48 Wh	48 Wh; 53 Wh
Battery	Type	Li-Ion													
Cameras	Front camera	1.2 MP		5 MP											
Cameras	Front camera	HD video		FHD video										QHD video	
Cameras	Rear camera	1.2 MP		5 MP	8 MP				10 MP		8 MP	10 MP		10.5 MP	
Cameras	Rear camera	HD video		FHD video					4K video		FHD video	4K video			
Cameras	Rear autofocus	No			Yes										
Sensors	Ambient light	Yes													
Sensors	Accelerometer	Yes													
Sensors	Gyroscope	Yes													
Sensors	GPS	No							Yes		No		Partial	No	
Sensors	Magnetometer	Yes				No			Yes		No	Yes			
Sensors	NFC	No												Yes	No
Sensors	Microphones	2													
Connectors	A/V	3.5 mm audio socket							2 × USB-C 3.1		3.5 mm audio socket				2 x USB-C 4 with Thunderbolt 4
Connectors	A/V	Mini DisplayPort						USB-C	2 × USB-C 3.1		USB-C	2 × USB-C 4.0 with Thunderbolt 4			2 x USB-C 4 with Thunderbolt 4
Connectors	USB	USB-A 3.0						USB-A 3.0, USB-C 3.1	2 × USB-C 3.1		USB-A 3.0, USB-C 3.1	2 × USB-C 4.0 with Thunderbolt 4			2 x USB-C 4 with Thunderbolt 4
Connectors	Surface Connect	Surface Connect (5-pin)		Surface Connect (40-pin)											
Connectors	Cover port	Cover port with power pins				Cover port			Surface Keyboard port		Cover port	Surface Keyboard port			
Radios	Wi-Fi	WiFi 4		2x2 MIMO WiFi 5				2x2 MIMO WiFi 6	2x2 MIMO WiFi 5		2x2 MIMO WiFi 6			2x2 MIMO WiFi 6e	2x2 MIMO Wi-Fi 7
Radios	Bluetooth	4.0				4.1		5.0				5.1		5.3	5.4
Radios	Cellular	No				Optional	No		Optional				Yes on SQ3 models	Optional	Optional on X models
Surface Pen support	Technology	Wacom passive pen		Microsoft Pen Protocol											
Surface Pen support	Pressure levels	256	1024	256	1024	4096									
Surface Pen support	Tilt levels	No				1024									
TPM		Yes	Yes (1.2)	Yes (2.0)											
Surface Dial support		Partial (no on-screen support, Windows 10 upgrade)			Yes firmware update	Yes									
Integrated Windows Hello support		No			Yes (via backlit IR camera)										

=== Surface Book line ===
Model		Surface Book	Surface Book with Performance Base	Surface Book 2	Surface Book 3
Date released		October 26, 2015	November 10, 2016	November 16, 2017	May 21, 2020
Operating system	Initial	Windows 10 version 1507	Windows 10 version 1607	Windows 10 version 1703	Windows 10 version 1909
Operating system	Latest supported	Windows 10 version 22H2		Latest Windows version	
Operating system	Edition	Pro			
Driver support until		November 13, 2021		June 30, 2023	April 1, 2025
Dimensions mm (in)	Height	232 (9.1)			
Dimensions mm (in)	Width	312 (12.3)			
Dimensions mm (in)	Depth	23 (0.91)			
Weight g (lb)		1,516 (3.342); 1,576 (3.474) (with dGPU)	1,647 (3.631)	1,534 (3.382) (13.5" i5); 1,642 (3.620) (13.5" i7); 1,905 (4.200) (15")	
RAM	Capacity (GB)	8/16		8/16 (13.5"); 16 (15")	8/16/32 (13.5"); 16/32 (15")
RAM	Speed (MHz)	1600		1866	3733
RAM	Type	LPDDR3			LPDDR4x
Internal storage	Size (GB)	128/256/512/1024	256/512/1024	256/512/1024	256/512/1024 (13.5"); 256/512/1024/2048 (15")
Internal storage	Type	PCIe SSD			
Expandable storage		MicroSDXC, up to 200 GB			
Display	Size (cm (in))	34.3 (13.5)		34.3 (13.5); 38.1 (15.0)	34.3 (13.5); 38.1 (15.0)
Display	Aspect ratio	3:2			
Display	Resolution	3000 × 2000		3000 × 2000 (13.5"); 3240 × 2160 (15")	
Display	PPI	267		267 (13.5"); 260 (15")	
Display	Refresh Rate (Hz)	60			
Processor	Generation	Intel 6th gen Skylake		Intel 7/8th gen Kaby Lake	Intel 10th gen Ice Lake
Processor	Model	i5-6300U	i7-6600U	i5-7300U i7-8650U	i5-1035G7 i7-1065G7
Processor	iGPU	Intel HD Graphics 520		Intel HD Graphics 620	Intel Iris Plus
Graphics card		Custom GeForce 940M	GeForce GTX 965M	GeForce GTX 1050 (13.5"); GeForce GTX 1060 (15")	GeForce GTX 1650 (13.5"); GeForce GTX 1660 Ti (15"); GeForce RTX 3000 (15")
Battery	Capacity (Wh)	Display: 18; Keyboard base: 51	Display: 18; Keyboard base: 63.4	13.5" Display: 18; 13.5" Keyboard base: 51	
Battery	Capacity (Wh)	Display: 18; Keyboard base: 51	Display: 18; Keyboard base: 63.4	15" Display: 23; 15" Keyboard base: 67	
Battery	Type	Li-ion			
Cameras	Front camera	5 MP			
Cameras	Front camera	FHD (1920 × 1080) video			
Cameras	Rear camera	8 MP			
Cameras	Rear camera	FHD (1920 × 1080) video			
Sensors	Ambient light sensor	Yes			
Sensors	Accelerometer	Yes			
Sensors	Gyroscope	Yes			
Sensors	GPS	No			
Sensors	Magnetometer	No		Yes	
Sensors	Microphones	2			
Connectors	A/V	3.5 mm audio socket			
Connectors	A/V	Mini DisplayPort		USB-C	
Connectors	USB	2 × USB-A 3.0		2 × USB-A 3.0, 1 × USB-C 3.1	
Connectors	Surface Connect	Surface Connect (40-pin)			
Radios	Wi-Fi	Wi-Fi 5			Wi-Fi 6
Radios	Bluetooth	4.0 LE		4.1	5.0
Radios	Cellular	No			
Surface Pen support	Technology	Microsoft Pen Protocol			
Surface Pen support	Pressure levels	1024		4096	
Surface Pen support	Tilt levels	1024			
TPM		Yes		Yes (2.0)	
Surface Dial support		Yes (with firmware update)		Yes	
Integrated Windows Hello support		Yes (via backlit IR camera)			

=== Surface Laptop line ===
Model		Laptop	Laptop 2	Laptop 3	Laptop 4	Laptop 5	Laptop 6	Laptop (7th)
Date released		June 15, 2017	October 16, 2018	October 22, 2019	April 20, 2021	October 25, 2022	April 9, 2024	June 18, 2024
Operating system	Initial	Windows 10 version 1607	Windows 10 version 1803	Windows 10 version 1903	Windows 10 version 20H2	Windows 11 version 22H2	Windows 11 version 23H2	Windows 11 version 24H2
Operating system	Latest supported	Windows 10 version 22H2	Latest Windows version					
Operating system	Edition	S	Home/Pro				Pro	Home/Pro
Driver support until		November 13, 2021	December 27, 2022	July 30, 2024	April 15, 2027	October 25, 2028		
Dimensions mm (in)	Height	223.2 (8.79)		224 (8.8); 244 (9.6)	223 (8.8); 244 (9.6)			220 (8.7); 239 (9.4)
Dimensions mm (in)	Width	308 (12.1)		308 (12.1); 339.5 (13.37)				301 (11.9); 329 (13.0)
Dimensions mm (in)	Depth	14.5 (0.57)		14.5 (0.57); 14.69 (0.578)			16.7 (0.66); 16.9 (0.67)	17.5 (0.69); 18.3 (0.72)
Weight (g (lb))		1,250 (2.76)	1,260 (2.78)	1,265 (2.789); 1,542 (3.400)		1,272 (2.804); 1,545 (3.406)	1,380 (3.04); 1,680 (3.70)	1,340 (2.95); 1,660 (3.66)
RAM	Capacity (GB)	4/8/16	8/16	8/16/32			8/16/32/64	16/32/64
RAM	Speed (MHz)	1866		3733; 2400		5200		
RAM	Type	LPDDR3		LPDDR4X; DDR4		LPDDR5X	LPDDR5; LPDDR5X	LPDDR5X
Internal storage	Size (GB)	128/256/512/1024		128/256/512/1024	256/512/1024			
Internal storage	Type	PCIe SSD						
Internal storage	Removable	No		Yes				
Expandable storage (GB)		No						
Display	Size	34.29 cm (13.50 in)		34.29 cm (13.50 in); 38.1 cm (15.0 in)				35.05 cm (13.80 in); 38.1 cm (15.0 in)
Display	Aspect ratio	3:2						
Display	Resolution	1536 x 1024 pixels		2256 x 1504 pixels 2496 x 1664 pixels				2304 x 1536 pixels 2496 x 1664 pixels
Display	PPI	201						
Display	Refresh rate	60 Hz						120 Hz
Display	Technology	LCD						
Processor	Generation	Intel 7th generation Kaby Lake	Intel 8th generation Kaby Lake R	Intel 10th generation Ice Lake; AMD Zen+	Intel 11th generation Tiger Lake; AMD Zen 2	Intel 12th generation Alder Lake	Intel 1st gen Meteor Lake	Qualcomm; Snapdragon X Intel 2nd gen Lunar Lake
Processor	Model	m3-7Y30 i5-7200U i7-7660U	i5-8250U i5-8350U i7-8650U	i5-1035G7 i7-1065G7; 5 3580U; 7 3780U	i5-1135G7 i5-1145G7 i7-1185G7; 5 4680U; 7 4980U	i5-1235U i7-1255U	5-135H; 7-165H	X Plus; X Elite; 5-236V; 5-238V; 7-266V; 7-268V
Processor	iGPU	HD Graphics 615; HD Graphics 620; HD Graphics 640	HD Graphics 620	Iris Plus; Radeon Vega 9 Radeon RX Vega 11	Iris Xe; Radeon Graphics	Iris Xe	Arc	Adreno; Arc 2nd gen
Processor	NPU	—N/a					Yes	
Battery	Capacity (Wh)	45.2 Wh		45.8 Wh		46 Wh	47 Wh	54 Wh; 66 Wh
Battery	Type	Li-Ion						
Front camera		5 MP						
Front camera		HD video					FHD video	
Sensors	Ambient light	Yes						
Sensors	Accelerometer	No						
Sensors	Gyroscope	No						
Sensors	GPS	No						
Sensors	Magnetometer	No						
Sensors	Microphones	2						
Connectors	A/V	3.5 mm audio socket						
Connectors	A/V	Mini DisplayPort		USB-C				
Connectors	USB	USB-A 3.0		USB-A 3.0, USB-C 3.1		USB-A 3.1, USB-C 4.0	USB-A 3.1, USB-C 4.0; USB-A 3.1, 2x USB-C 4.0	USB-A 3.1, 2x USB-C 4.0
Connectors	Surface Connect	Surface Connect (40-pin)						
Radios	Wi-Fi	Wi-Fi 5		Wi-Fi 6 Wi-Fi 5	Wi-Fi 6		Wi-Fi 6E	Wi-Fi 7
Radios	Bluetooth	4.0 LE	4.1	5.0		5.1	5.3	5.4
Radios	Cellular	No						Optional on Lunar Lake models
Surface Pen support	Technology	Microsoft Pen Protocol						—N/a
Surface Pen support	Pressure levels	4096						—N/a
Surface Pen support	Tilt levels	1024						—N/a
TPM		Yes (2.0)						
Surface Dial support		Yes						No
Integrated Windows Hello support		Yes (via backlit IR camera)						

=== Surface Studio line ===
Models		Surface Studio	Surface Studio 2	Surface Studio 2+
Date released		December 15, 2016	October 2, 2018	October 12, 2022
Operating System	Initial	Windows 10 version 1607	Windows 10 version 1803	Windows 11 version 22H2
Operating System	Latest supported	Windows 10 version 22H2	Latest Windows version	
Operating System	Edition	Pro		
Driver support until		November 13, 2021	October 2, 2024	October 2, 2028
Base dimensions mm (in)	Height	220 (8.7)		
Base dimensions mm (in)	Width	250 (9.8)		
Base dimensions mm (in)	Depth	31.4 (1.24)		
Display dimensions mm (in)	Height	438.9 (17.28)		
Display dimensions mm (in)	Width	637.3 (25.09)		
Display dimensions mm (in)	Depth	12.5 (0.49)		
Weight kg (lb)		9.56 (21.1) max		
RAM	Capacity (GB)	8/16/32	16/32	32
RAM	Speed (MHz)	2133	2400	
RAM	Type	DDR4		
Internal storage	Capacity (TB)	1/2		1
Internal storage	Type	Hybrid drive	PCIe SSD	
Expandable storage		SDXC, up to 200 GB		N/A
Display	Size (cm (in))	71.1 (28.0)		
Display	Aspect ratio	3:2		
Display	Resolution	4500 × 3000		
Display	Pixel density (PPI)	192		
Display	Refresh rate (Hz)	60		
Display	Technology	LCD		
Processor	Generation	Intel 6th generation Skylake	Intel 7th generation Kaby Lake	Intel 11th generation Tiger Lake
Processor	Model	i5-6440HQ i7-6820HQ	i7-7820HQ	i7-11370H
Graphics card		GeForce GTX 965M; GeForce GTX 980M	GeForce GTX 1060; GeForce GTX 1070	GeForce RTX 3060
Front camera		5 MP		
Front camera		FHD (1920 × 1080) video		
Sensors	Ambient light sensor	Yes		
Sensors	Microphones	2		
Connectors	A/V	3.5 mm audio socket		
Connectors	A/V	Mini DisplayPort	1x USB-C	3x USB-C 4.0 with Thunderbolt 4
Connectors	USB	N/A	1x USB-C	3x USB-C 4.0 with Thunderbolt 4
Connectors	USB	4x USB-A 3.0		2x USB-A 3.1
Connectors	Ethernet	1x Gigabit Ethernet		
Radios	Wi-Fi	Wi-Fi 5		Wi-Fi 6
Radios	Bluetooth	4.0 LE		5.1
Surface Pen support	Technology	Microsoft Pen Protocol		
Surface Pen support	Pressure levels	1024	4096	
Surface Pen support	Tilt levels	1024		
TPM		Yes (2.0)		
Surface Dial support		Yes		
Integrated Windows Hello support		Yes (via backlit IR camera)		

== Promotion ==
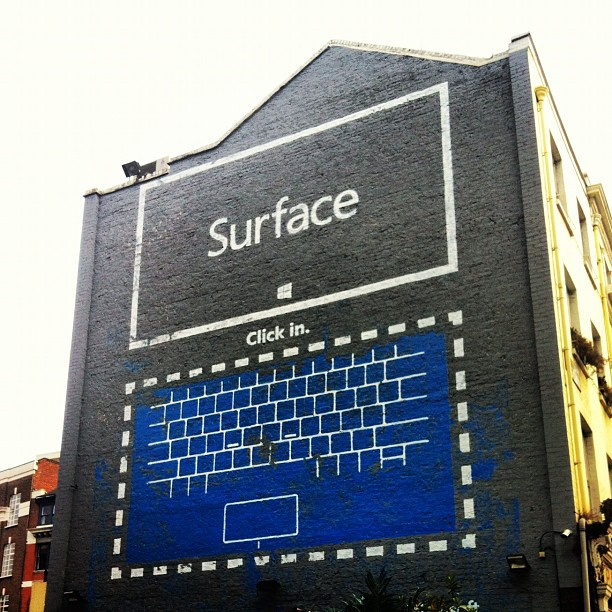
A Surface advert painted on the side of a building

=== Television commercial ===
In October 2012, Microsoft aired its first commercial, directed by Jon Chu, for the Surface product line. The first 30-second commercial is the Surface Movement which focus on Windows RT version of the first generation of Surface with detachable keyboard and kickstand. It first aired during Dancing with the Stars commercial break.

=== Partnership with NFL ===
In 2014, Microsoft announced a five-year, $400 million deal with the National Football League, in which Surface became the official tablet computer brand of the NFL. As part of the partnership, special, ruggedized Surface Pro 2 devices were issued to teams for use on the sidelines, allowing coaches and players view and annotate footage of previous plays. The partnership was initially hampered by television commentators, who erroneously referred to the devices as being an "iPad" on several occasions. Microsoft has since stated that it "coached" commentators on properly referring to the devices on-air.

=== Designed on Surface ===
On January 11, 2016, Microsoft announced a collaboration with POW! WOW!. It includes a group of artists from around the world that utilizes various Surface devices, such as the Surface Pro 4 and the Surface Book, to create a total of 17 murals. The artists are filmed using their Surface devices and explain how they integrate Surface into their workflow. The final products are then posted to YouTube that accompanies a post on the Microsoft Devices blog.

=== United States Department of Defense ===
On February 17, 2016, Microsoft announced that alongside the US Department of Defense's plans to upgrade to Windows 10, it has approved Surface devices and certified them for use through the Defense Information Systems Agency Unified Capabilities Approved Products List. Surface Book, Surface Pro 4, Surface Pro 3, and Surface 3 have all been approved as Multifunction Mobile Devices, thus meeting the necessary requirements for security and compatibility with other systems.

== Reception ==
=== Industry response ===
When Surface was first announced, critics noted that the device represented a significant departure for Microsoft, as the company had previously relied exclusively on third-party OEMs to produce devices running Windows, and began shifting towards a first-party hardware model with similarities to that of Apple. Steve Ballmer said that like Xbox, Surface was an example of the sort of hardware products Microsoft will release in the future.

Original equipment manufacturers (OEMs), whose products have traditionally run Microsoft operating systems, have had positive responses to the release of Surface. HP, Lenovo, Samsung, and Dell applauded Microsoft's decision to create its own Tablet PC and said that relationships with Microsoft have not changed. John Solomon, senior vice president of HP, said that "Microsoft was basically making a leadership statement and showing what's possible in the tablet space". Acer founder Stan Shih said that he believed Microsoft only introduced its own hardware in order to establish the market and would then withdraw in favor of its OEMs.

However, others believe that OEMs were left sidelined by the perception that Microsoft's new tablet would replace their products. Acer chairman JT Wang advised Microsoft to "please think twice". Microsoft has acknowledged that Surface may "affect their commitment" of partners to the Windows platform.

The need for the Surface to market an ARM-compatible version of Windows was questioned by analysts because of recent developments in the PC industry; both Intel and AMD introduced x86-based system-on-chip designs for Windows 8, Atom "Clover Trail" and "Temash" respectively, in response to the growing competition from ARM licensees. In particular, Intel claimed that Clover Trail-based tablets could provide battery life rivaling that of ARM devices; in a test by PC World, Samsung's Clover Trail-based Ativ Smart PC was shown to have battery life exceeding that of the first gen ARM-based Surface. Peter Bright of Ars Technica argued that Windows RT had no clear purpose, since the power advantage of ARM-based devices was "nowhere near as clear-cut as it was two years ago", and that users would be better off purchasing Office 2013 themselves because of the removed features and licensing restrictions of Office RT.

=== Sales ===
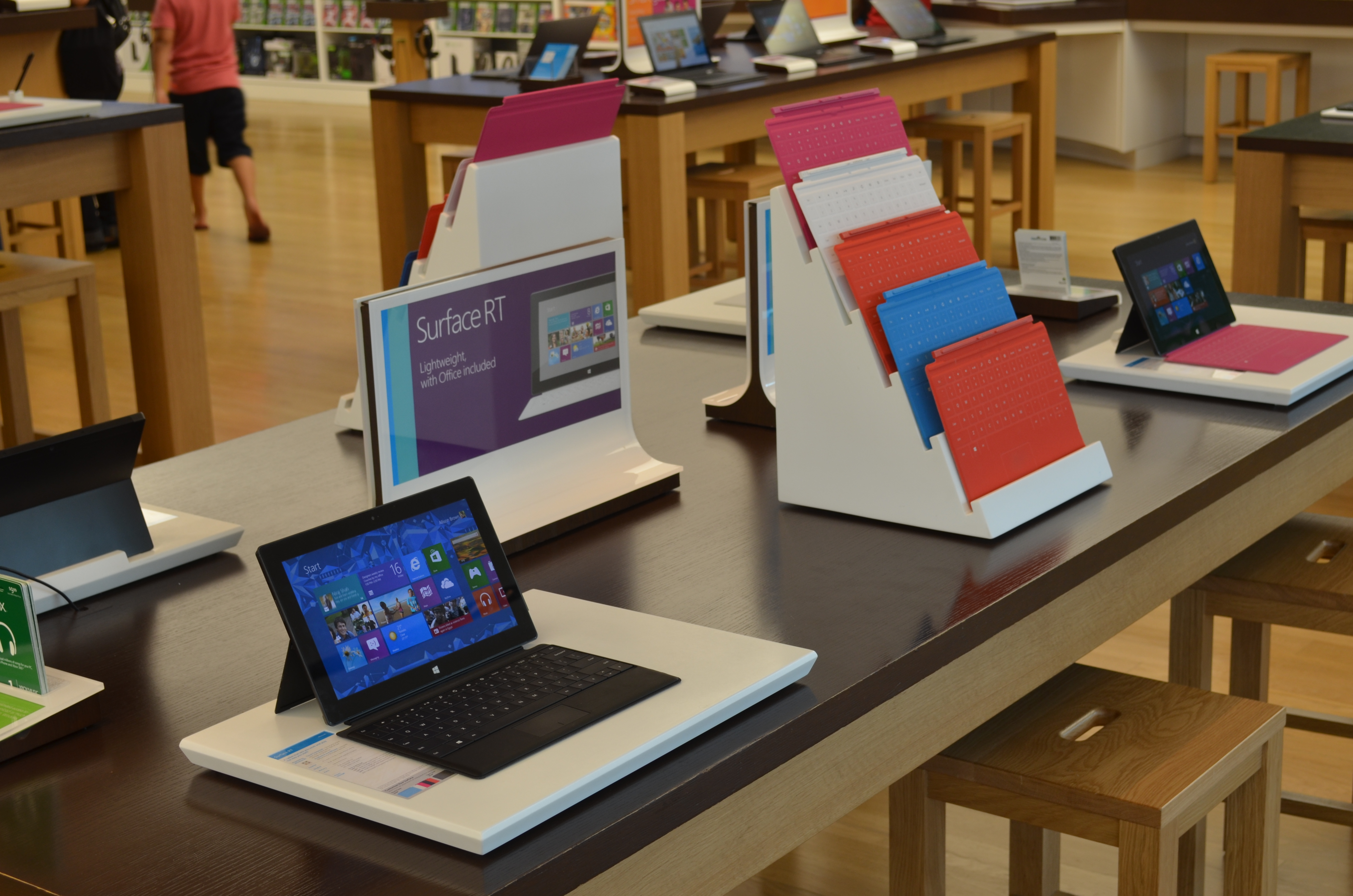
First-generation Surface tablets for sale at a Microsoft Store

Sales of the first generation Surface did not meet Microsoft's expectations, which led to price reductions and other sales incentives.

In July 2013, Steve Ballmer revealed that the Surface hasn't sold as well as he hoped. He reported that Microsoft had made a loss of US$900,000,000 due to the lackluster Surface sales. Concurrently, Microsoft cut the price of first-gen Surface RT worldwide by 30%, with its U.S. price falling to US$350. This was followed by a further price cut in August after it was revealed that even the marketing costs had exceed the sales. On August 4, 2013, the cost of Surface Pro was cut by $100 giving it an entry price of $799. Several law firms sued Microsoft, accusing the company of misleading shareholders about sales of the first-gen ARM based Surface tablet, calling it an "unmitigated disaster". In the first two years of sales, Microsoft lost almost two billion dollars.

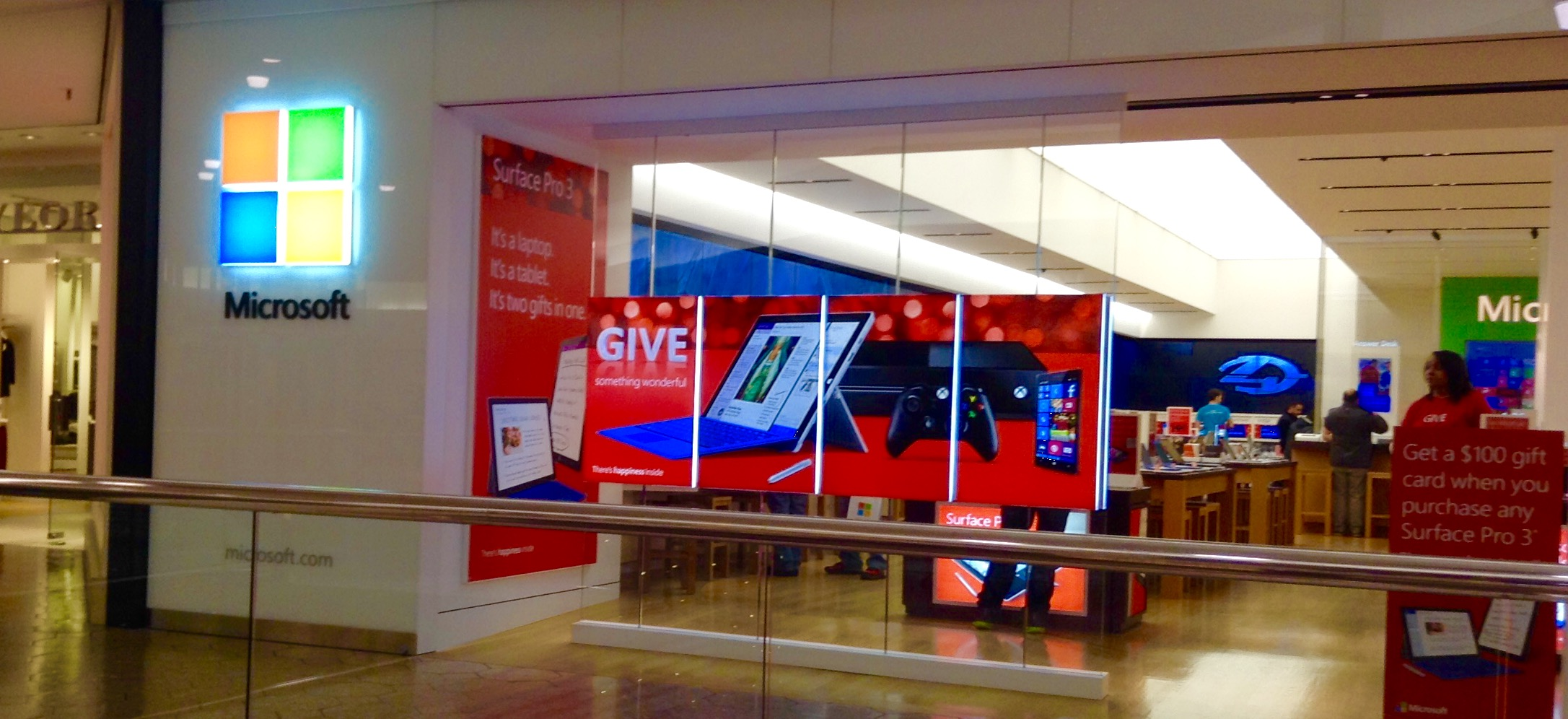
Surface Pro 3 promotion in front of a Microsoft Store

The poor sales of the ARM-based Surface tablet had been credited to the continuing market dominance of Microsoft's competitors in the tablet market. Particularly, Apple's iPad retained its dominance due its App store offering the most tablet-optimized applications. Most OEMs opted to produce tablets running Google Android, which came in a wide variety of sizes and prices (albeit with mixed success among most OEMs), and Google Play had the second-largest selection of tablet applications. By contrast there was a limited amount of software designed specifically for Surface's operating system, Windows RT, the selection which was even weaker than Windows Phone. Indeed, OEMs reported that most customers felt Intel-based tablets were more appropriate for use in business environments, as they were compatible with the much more widely available x86 programs while Windows RT was not. Microsoft's subsequent efforts have been focused upon refining the Surface Pro and making it a viable competitor in the premium ultra-mobile PC category, against other Ultrabooks and the MacBook Air, while discontinuing development of ARM-powered Surface devices as the Surface 3 (non-Pro) had an Intel x86 CPU (albeit with lower performance than the Surface Pro 3).

The resultant Surface Pro 3 succeeded in garnering a great interest in the Surface line, making Surface business profitable for the first time in fiscal year Q1 2015. Later in Q2, the Surface division's sales topped $1 billion. Surface division scored $888 million for Q4 2015 despite an overall loss of $2.1 billion for Microsoft, a 117% year-over-year growth thanks to the steady commercial performance of Surface Pro 3 and the launch of mainstream model Surface 3. In the first quarter of fiscal year 2018 the Surface division posted its best earnings performance to date.

== Timeline ==
Timeline of Surface devices
Sources: Microsoft Devices Blog Microsoft Surface Store Microsoft Surface for Business store

== See also ==
- Microsoft PixelSense, a product line launched in 2007 and formerly called Microsoft Surface
- Comparison of tablet computers
- Microsoft Lumia
