= Surface Go 4 =

Tablet computer from Microsoft

- Developer: Microsoft
- Product family: Microsoft Surface
- Type: 2-in-1 detachable tablet computer
- Generation: Fourth
- Released: 3 October 2023; 3 years ago
- Availability: Available only at Microsoft Surface For Business Store (except in Germany and the Netherlands)
- Introductory price: $579 to $779
- Operating system: Windows 11 Pro
- CPU: Intel Processor N200
- Memory: 8 GB RAM
- Storage: 64GB, 128GB, 256GB
- Removable storage: MicroSDXC
- Display: 10.5 inch Touchscreen; PixelSense Display; 1920 x 1280, (220 ppi); 3:2 Aspect Ratio; Gorilla Glass 3
- Graphics: Intel UHD Graphics
- Sound: 2W stereo speakers with Dolby Audio, 3.5 mm headphone jack, Dual far-field Studio Mics with Voice Clarity
- Input: Built in: touchscreen, ambient light sensor, accelerometer, gyroscope, magnetometer Sold separately: type cover, mouse, stylus pen, Surface Dial
- Camera: Front: 5 MP, 1080p HD; Rear: 8 MP, 1080p HD
- Touchpad: On the Surface Type Cover (sold separately)
- Connectivity: Wifi 6, Bluetooth 5.1
- Power: 24W
- Online services: Microsoft Store, Microsoft 365
- Dimensions: 245 mm x 175 mm x 8.3 mm (9.65 in x 6.9 in x 0.33 in)
- Weight: 521 grams (1.149 lb)
- Predecessor: Surface Go 3
- Website: www.microsoft.com

The Surface Go 4 For Business is the fourth generation model of the Surface Go series of devices, targeted at businesses rather than consumers, introduced as the successor to the Surface Go 3 For Business by Microsoft at their Surface Event on September 21, 2023. The tablet runs Windows 11 Pro.

Unlike the Surface Go 3, this model does not offer color options, or LTE networking. Its marketing pivoted to marketing the improved repairability of the device. While the Surface Go 4 is marketed as a device for businesses, it was made available to the general public from the Microsoft Store and various retailers. But only in Germany and the Netherlands according to the afformentioned sources.

== Configuration ==
Surface Go 4 For Business configuration options
Price tier in USD	CPU	GPU	RAM	Internal storage	LTE	Color
Commercial	CPU	GPU	RAM	Internal storage	LTE	Color
$689	Intel N200	Intel UHD Graphics (32 EU @ 750Mhz)	8 GB LPDDR5 4800 MHz (soldered)	64 GB; UFS 3.1	No	Platinum
$799	Intel N200	Intel UHD Graphics (32 EU @ 750Mhz)	8 GB LPDDR5 4800 MHz (soldered)	128 GB; UFS 3.1	No	Platinum
$919	Intel N200	Intel UHD Graphics (32 EU @ 750Mhz)	8 GB LPDDR5 4800 MHz (soldered)	256 GB; UFS 3.1	No	Platinum

== Features ==
- Windows 11 Pro or Windows 10 Pro
- 10.5-inch 1920x1280 (220PPI) 3.2 PixelSense™ Touch Display
- 12th Gen Intel N200 processor
- Intel UHD Graphics GPU
- 8 GB RAM
- 64 GB, 128 GB, and 256 GB storage options
- Windows Hello with IR camera for facial recognition logon
- A headphone jack, USB-C port, and microSD card slot
- The 8.3 mm thick tablet weighs 521 grams (1.15 pounds) without the type cover.
- Up to 12.5 Hours of battery life
- Serviceability

== Hardware ==
The Surface Go 4 is the 7th addition to the lightweight 2-in-1 Surface lineup. The Surface Go 4 is aimed toward small to mid-sized businesses. The tablet chassis has not changed significantly since the last generation. There is only one option for the processor, the Intel Processor N200, based on the Alder Lake microarchitecture. The N200 is claimed to be 80% faster than the previous processor in the Surface Go 3, however the microsoft website does not specify which processor this is in reference to. All options of the Surface Go come with 8GB of RAM. Storage on the device is the same as the previous model, with options for 64GB, 128GB, or 256GB.

The device has a single USB-C Type 3.1 Gen 1 (5Gbps) full function port. Allowing for the use of charging and displayport output through the USB-C Connector. The system has a proprietary Surface Connect port for charging and docking the device to other accessories. The front-facing camera assembly has an infrared sensor that supports login via Windows Hello. The device comes with a Dual far-field Studio Mic setup with Voice Clarity, improving on the previous microphone array.

The Surface Go 4 uses the same 8-pin keyboard interface as the previous Surface Go models, so the device is compatible with previous type covers.

== Software ==
The Surface Go 4 runs Windows 11 Pro or Windows 10 Pro depending on how the device is configured. The device also supports Windows Hello login using biometric facial recognition. Windows 11 comes with multiple default applications along with options to add Microsoft 365 applications in Business Standard, Business Premium, or a 30-day free trial Version.

== Serviceability ==
Microsoft designed the Surface Go 4 to be much more repairable than its predecessors. According to Microsoft, the following components are FRUs, or Field replaceable Units:

- Display
- Battery and back cover
- Kickstand
- Hinge
- Motherboard
- MicroSDXC card reader
- Type Cover connector
- Front camera
- Rear camera
- Windows Hello camera
- Speakers

Along with notifying businesses of what parts are replaceable, Microsoft provides documentation on how to troubleshoot your device, articles made for specific device types, Where to purchase parts, and FAQs for the most common issues.

As part of the initiative to make their devices repairable, Microsoft has partnered with iFixit in order to provide instructions and spare parts. Parts can also be ordered directly from Microsoft through the Microsoft Store.

== Timeline ==
Timeline of Surface devices
Sources: Microsoft Devices Blog Microsoft Surface Store Microsoft Surface for Business store

Preceded by Surface Go 3	Surface; 7th generation alongside Surface Laptop Studio, Surface Pro 8, Surface Duo 2	Most recent
