= Surface Go 3 =

Tablet computer from Microsoft

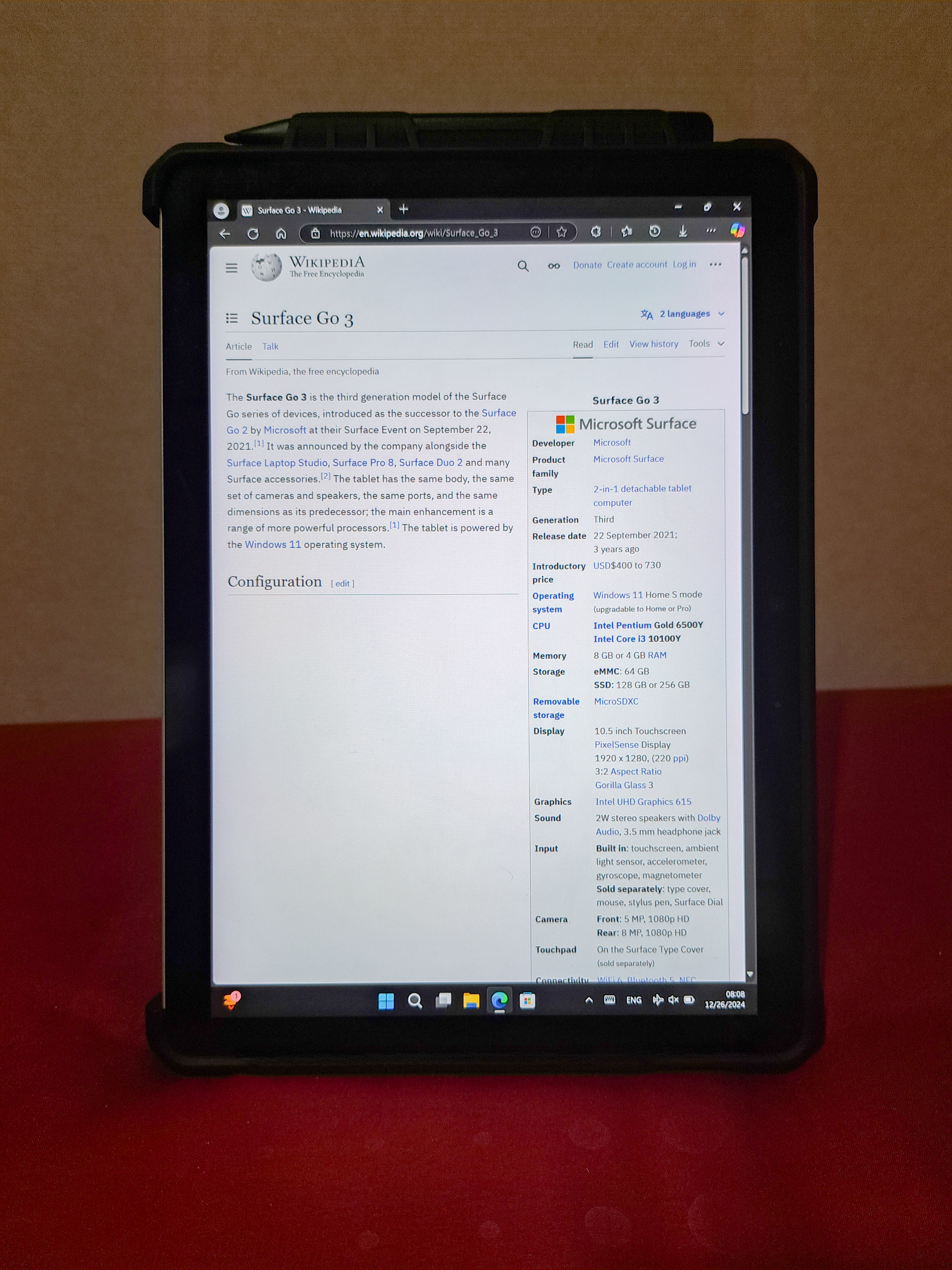
- Surface Go 3 with case and stylus running Windows 11
- Developer: Microsoft
- Product family: Microsoft Surface
- Type: 2-in-1 detachable tablet computer
- Generation: Third
- Released: 22 September 2021; 4 years ago
- Introductory price: USD400 to 730
- Discontinued: Yes
- Operating system: Windows 11 Home S mode (upgradable to Home or Pro)
- CPU: Intel Pentium Gold 6500Y; Intel Core i3 10100Y
- Memory: 8 GB or 4 GB RAM
- Storage: eMMC: 64 GB; SSD: 128 GB or 256 GB
- Removable storage: MicroSDXC
- Display: 10.5 inch Touchscreen; PixelSense Display; 1920 x 1280, (220 ppi); 3:2 Aspect Ratio; Gorilla Glass 3
- Graphics: Intel UHD Graphics 615
- Sound: 2W stereo speakers with Dolby Audio, 3.5 mm headphone jack
- Input: Built in: touchscreen, ambient light sensor, accelerometer, gyroscope, magnetometer Sold separately: type cover, mouse, stylus pen, Surface Dial
- Camera: Front: 5 MP, 1080p HD; Rear: 8 MP, 1080p HD
- Touchpad: On the Surface Type Cover (sold separately)
- Connectivity: WiFi 6, Bluetooth 5, NFC, LTE A, USB C, Snapdragon X16 LTE modem, eSIM and nano SIM
- Power: 24W
- Online services: Microsoft Store, OneDrive
- Dimensions: 245 mm x 175 mm x 8.3 mm (9.65 in x 6.9 in x 0.33 in)
- Weight: 544 grams (1.199 lb) (WiFi model); 553 grams (1.219 lb) (LTE model)
- Predecessor: Surface Go 2
- Successor: Surface Go 4
- Website: www.surface.com

The Surface Go 3 is the third generation model of the Surface Go series of devices, introduced as the successor to the Surface Go 2 by Microsoft at their Surface Event on September 22, 2021. It was announced by the company alongside the Surface Laptop Studio, Surface Pro 8, Surface Duo 2 and many Surface accessories. The tablet has the same body, the same set of cameras and speakers, the same ports, and the same dimensions as its predecessor; the main enhancement is a range of more powerful processors. The tablet is powered by the Windows 11 operating system.

== Configuration ==
Surface Go 3 configuration options
Price tier in USD		CPU	GPU	RAM	Internal storage	LTE	Color	
Consumer	Commercial	CPU	GPU	RAM	Internal storage	LTE	Color	
$400		Intel Pentium Gold 6500Y	Intel UHD Graphics 615 (23 EU @ 900Mhz)	4 GB	64 GB eMMC	No	P	
$500		Intel Pentium Gold 6500Y	Intel UHD Graphics 615 (23 EU @ 900Mhz)	4 GB	64 GB eMMC	Yes	B	P
$550		Intel Pentium Gold 6500Y	Intel UHD Graphics 615 (23 EU @ 900Mhz)	8 GB	128 GB NVMe SSD	No	B	P
	$500	Intel Core i3-10100Y	Intel UHD Graphics 615 (24 EU @ 1 GHz)	4 GB	64 GB eMMC	No	P	
$630	$680	Intel Core i3-10100Y	Intel UHD Graphics 615 (24 EU @ 1 GHz)	8 GB	128 GB NVMe SSD	No	B	P
$730	$780	Intel Core i3-10100Y	Intel UHD Graphics 615 (24 EU @ 1 GHz)	8 GB	128 GB NVMe SSD	Yes	B	P
	$880	Intel Core i3-10100Y	Intel UHD Graphics 615 (24 EU @ 1 GHz)	8 GB	256 GB NVMe SSD	Yes	B	P

Matte black Platinum

At launch, the Surface Go 3 was only available in one color option, platinum. A matte black color was made available on January 11, 2022 for all 8GB models. The Wi-Fi models of the tablet started shipping on October 5, 2021, while the LTE models shipped in December 2021 in North America and in Q1 2022 in other markets.

== Features ==
- Windows 11 operating system
- 10th Gen Intel Core i3 or Pentium Gold processor (dual-core Amber Lake-Y)
- 10.5 inch 1920 x 1280 display
- Windows Hello with IR camera for facial recognition logon
- Intel UHD Graphics 615 GPU
- 4 GB and 8 GB RAM options
- 64 GB, 128 GB, and 256 GB storage options
- A headphone jack, USB-C port, microSD card slot, and a nano SIM card tray on LTE models
- All configurations can be upgraded to Windows 11 for free or Windows 11 Pro at an additional cost
- The 8.3 mm thick tablet weighs 544 grams (1.2 pounds).

== Hardware ==
The Surface Go 3 is the 6th addition to the lightweight 2-in-1 Surface lineup. The Surface Go 3 is aimed toward children and students. The tablet features the same magnesium alloy chassis and screen size as its predecessor. It has one of two fanless dual-core Amber Lake-Y microarchitecture processors, the Intel Core i3-10100Y or Intel Pentium Gold 6500Y. The 6500Y is 60% faster than the previous 4425Y in the Surface Go 2. The device has a USB C port supporting power delivery and a Surface Connect port. The front-facing camera assembly has an infrared sensor that supports login via Windows Hello.

A detachable keyboard uses an 8-pin connection which is compatible with the previous Surface Go models and retails at $99.

== Software ==
Surface Go 3 is powered by Windows 11 Home in S Mode by default with a 30-day trial of Microsoft 365; however, this can be opted out of and upgraded to Home for free or Pro for a fee.

The device also supports Windows Hello login using a biometric facial recognition.

== Timeline ==
Timeline of Surface devices
Sources: Microsoft Devices Blog Microsoft Surface Store Microsoft Surface for Business store

Preceded by Surface Go 2	Surface; 6th generation alongside Surface Laptop Studio, Surface Pro 8, Surface Duo 2	Succeeded by Surface Go 4
