= Surface Laptop Studio 2 =

Microsoft laptop

- Developer: Microsoft
- Product family: Microsoft Surface
- Type: Laptop
- Generation: Second
- Released: September 21, 2023; 3 years ago
- Availability: October 3, 2023; 3 years ago
- Introductory price: USD $2,000 - $4,500
- Discontinued: May 16, 2025; 16 months ago
- Operating system: Windows 11 Home (Consumer models); Windows 11 Pro (Business models)
- CPU: Raptor Lake i7-13700H
- Memory: 16GB, 32GB, 64GB LPDDR5X RAM
- Storage: 512GB, 1TB, 2TB Removable SSD
- Predecessor: Surface Laptop Studio
- Successor: Surface Laptop Ultra
- Website: Business Webpage; Consumer Webpage

The Surface Laptop Studio 2 is a 2-in-1 convertible laptop developed by Microsoft. It was announced at a livestreamed event by the company alongside the Surface Laptop Go 3 on September 21, 2023. The device is a successor to the original Surface Laptop Studio released in 2021, and features an updated chip.

On May 15, 2025, it was reported that Microsoft had stopped producing the Surface Laptop Studio 2, with no immediate replacement.

== Features ==
- Windows 11 operating system
- Intel Raptor Lake 13th Gen i7-13700H
- Nvidia Ada GPU: RTX 4050/4060 (Consumer), or RTX 2000 Ada (Enterprise)
- 120 Hz refresh rate and Dolby Vision support
- 16GB/32GB/64GB LPDDR5X RAM
- 512GB/1TB/2TB NVME SSD storage
- 2 Thunderbolt 4 USB-C ports

== Configurations ==
Surface Laptop Studio Configuration Options
Price Tier in USD		CPU	GPU	RAM	Internal storage
Consumer	Business	CPU	GPU	RAM	Internal storage
$2,000	$2,100	Consumer: Intel Core i7-13700H Commercial: Intel Core i7-13800H	Intel Iris Xe	16 GB	512 GB
$2,400	$2,500	Consumer: Intel Core i7-13700H Commercial: Intel Core i7-13800H	NVIDIA GeForce RTX 4050	16 GB	512 GB
$2,800	$2,900	Consumer: Intel Core i7-13700H Commercial: Intel Core i7-13800H	NVIDIA GeForce RTX 4050	32GB	1TB
$3,400	$3,500	Consumer: Intel Core i7-13700H Commercial: Intel Core i7-13800H	NVIDIA GeForce RTX 4060	64GB	1TB
$3,600	$3,700	Consumer: Intel Core i7-13700H Commercial: Intel Core i7-13800H	NVIDIA RTX 2000 Ada	32GB	1TB
$3,700	$3,800	Consumer: Intel Core i7-13700H Commercial: Intel Core i7-13800H	NVIDIA GeForce RTX 4060	64GB	2TB
	$4,500	Consumer: Intel Core i7-13700H Commercial: Intel Core i7-13800H	NVIDIA RTX 2000 Ada	64GB	2TB

== Hardware ==
The Surface Laptop Studio 2 has a very similar design to the original Surface Laptop Studio. It features the same three-position 14.4-inch touch display, 2400 x 1600 pixel resolution, 3:2 aspect ratio, removable SSD and Precision Haptic touchpad.

The key differences are:

- The Laptop Studio 2 is thicker, at 0.86 inches (2.2 cm) compared to the original, which was 0.746 inches (1.9 cm) thick.
- The new laptop is also heavier, weighing in at 4.37 pounds (2 kg) compared to the 4.00 pounds (1.8 kg) of the original Laptop Studio.
- One USB A style port and a microSD card reader is included alongside the two USB-C/Thunderbolt ports
- Finally, the new laptop is made of aluminum as opposed to magnesium.

== Timeline ==
Timeline of Surface devices
Sources: Microsoft Devices Blog Microsoft Surface Store Microsoft Surface for Business store

Preceded by Surface Laptop Studio	Surface Laptop Studio 2; 2023-present	Succeeded by TBA
