= Surface Pro (1st generation) =

Detachable tablet by Microsoft

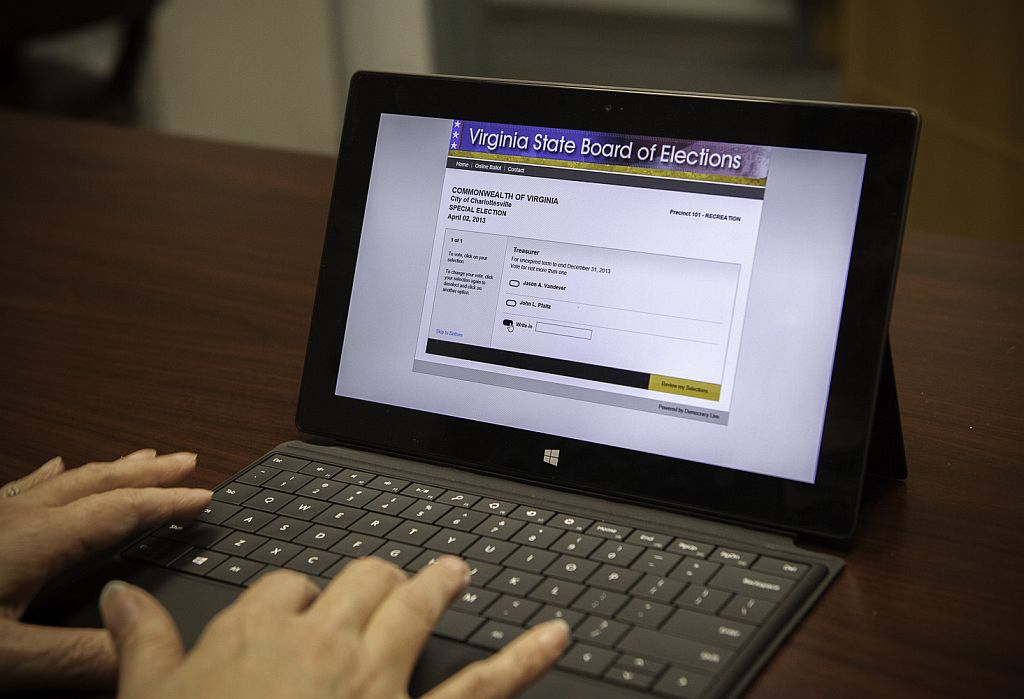
- Surface Pro with Type Cover attached
- Developer: Microsoft
- Manufacturer: Pegatron
- Type: 2-in-1 detachable tablet
- Released: February 9, 2013 (United States); May 23, 2013 (United Kingdom)
- Discontinued: October 22, 2013
- Operating system: Windows 8.1; Upgradable to Windows 10
- CPU: Intel low-voltage dual-core i5-3317U; 1.7 up to 2.6 GHz, 3 MB cache, 17 W
- Memory: 4 GB dual-channel DDR3-1600 (25.6 GB/sec)
- Storage: 64 GB (23 GB available); 128 GB (83 GB available)
- Removable storage: microSD slot, accepts cards of up to 200 GB
- Display: 10.6 inches (27 cm) 1920x1080 (208 ppi) ClearType HD screen with 16:9 aspect ratio
- Graphics: Intel HD Graphics 4000
- Input: 10-point multi-touch screen, pen input with Wacom digital pen digitizer, ambient light sensor, 3-axis accelerometer, 3-axis gyroscope, compass, dual microphones
- Camera: Front: 1.2 MP, 720p HD; Rear: 1.2 MP AF, 720p HD
- Connectivity: 2×2 MIMO Wi-Fi (802.11 a/b/g/n), Bluetooth 4.0, USB 3.0, Mini DisplayPort
- Power: 151.2 kJ (42 W·h) battery (4-5 hours)
- Online services: Windows Store, Xbox Music, OneDrive, Xbox Games, Xbox Video, Copilot (Windows 10 only)
- Dimensions: 10.81 inches (27.5 cm) (width); 6.81 inches (17.3 cm) (height); 0.53 inches (13 mm) (depth)
- Weight: 2 pounds (910 g)
- Predecessor: Surface RT
- Successor: Surface Pro 2 (2013)

The Surface Pro is a 2-in-1 detachable designed and manufactured by Microsoft, and the first generation of the Surface Pro line as part of the Microsoft Surface series. It was released in February 2013 and came with a 64-bit version of Windows 8.1 Pro operating system with a free upgrade possibility to Windows 10 Pro. The device was superseded later in 2013 by the second generation model, Surface Pro 2.

== History ==
Initially announced as Surface for Windows 8.1 Pro on June 18, 2012, at a Los Angeles event, Microsoft later renamed the device to Surface Pro, and launched it on February 9, 2013. Microsoft did not take pre-orders for the Surface Pro. It was available for a purchase on February 9, 2013, in the United States, Canada and China, and was released on May 23, 2013, in the United Kingdom and a number of other countries.

== Features ==
=== Hardware ===
The Surface Pro shares a lot of its design traits with its lower cost counterpart, the original Surface hybrid tablet, announced on the same day. Both have the dark VaporMg coating over the same magnesium body and a 10-point multi-touch enabled 10.6 inches (27 cm) screen with crack resistant Gorilla Glass. The Wifi is 802.11 a/b/g/n.

However, the resolution on the Surface Pro is higher at 1920×1080, and the screen has a Wacom EMR digitizer for pen input. Surface Pro runs a dual-core 1.7 GHz Intel Core i5-3317U CPU, with a Turbo Boost frequency of up to 2.6 GHz with a built-in Intel HD Graphics 4000. It has 4 GB of memory and a 64 or 128 GB solid-state drive. Unique to the Surface and Surface Pro is the kickstand which can be flipped out from the back, propping the device up. The kickstand comes out of the devices at a max of 22-degree angle, the same angle the edges of the device are angled at.

Along the right side of the device, the Surface Pro has a microSD card slot on top (with support for cards up to 200 GB), followed by the power port, and near the bottom, a Mini DisplayPort to connect a number of external displays. The bottom of the device (dubbed the "accessory spine") contains the cover port to attach a Touch Cover or Type Cover. In addition to the magnetic attachments, the cover port on the Surface Pro contains a pogo pin connector. Unique to the Surface Pro, compared to the Surface tablet, is the addition of power connectors for compatibility with the Surface Power Cover. The left side of the 2-in-1 contains a full-sized USB 3 port, the volume rocker, and the audio jack. The power button is on the top of the device. On the front and back of the device are two 720p Lifecam cameras, and inside is a 42 Watt-hour battery. Other sensors include an ambient light sensor, accelerometer, gyroscope, and compass.

=== Software ===
Surface Pro originally shipped with Windows 8.1 Pro. The Surface Pro is further capable of upgrading to Windows 10 Pro, which became a free upgrade for users since July 29, 2015.

=== Accessories ===
The 2-in-1 features two types of detachable keyboards: Type Cover and Touch Cover, both with an integrated touchpad. The former is 5 millimetres (0.20 in) thick and has moving keys for a more traditional typing feel, while the latter is 3 millimetres (0.12 in) thin and its keys do not move. Both accessories additionally act as a protective screen cover and are sold separately. Later Microsoft introduced the Power Cover (with the Surface Pro 2), which is backwards compatible with the Surface Pro.

Surface Pro is the first device in the Surface family to feature a stylus pen input. Pro Pen is based on Wacom digitizer technology. It is integrated with OneNote software which is also included with the Surface Pro and used for note taking and sketches.

The Surface Pro includes a 48-watt power supply with additional 5 W USB port for charging other devices. In early 2016, Microsoft issued a recall for the cable used to connect Surface Pro, Surface Pro 2 and Surface Pro 3 chargers, but not the charger itself, sold before the 15th of July, 2015 due to the risk of electrical fire.

== Reception ==
Surface Pro received mixed reviews from the computer hardware critics. While most praised the convertible nature of the device, which can be used both as a tablet and a laptop, its design and a precise pressure-sensitive pen, the typical complaints were a short battery life, bulkiness compared to traditional ARM-based tablets and excessive heat and fan noise during periods of heavy load. Other complaints included long response times when the computer was asleep, and even sudden shut downs in the middle of usage.

With the release of the Surface Pro 4 and Surface Book, cooling issues were resolved. Microsoft engineered the computers to dissipate 60% of their heat through the metal body using a combination of heat pipes and copper sinks. The fans only activate under load, allowing the computer to run cold and silent.

== Timeline ==
Timeline of Surface devices
Sources: Microsoft Devices Blog Microsoft Surface Store Microsoft Surface for Business store

Preceded by –	Surface Pro; 1st generation	Succeeded by Surface Pro 2
