= Eve V =

Personal computer from Finland

- Developer: Eve-Tech
- Released: December 4, 2017
- Operating system: Windows 10 (Upgradable to Windows 10 Pro)
- CPU: Intel Core m3-7Y30 i5-7Y54 i7-7Y75
- Memory: 8 GB LPDDR3, 16 GB LPDDR3
- Storage: 128 GB; 256 GB; 512 GB
- Display: 12.3 inches (31 cm) Sharp IGZO LCD; 2880 x 1920 resolution 1:1500 contrast ratio, 400 nits brightness Gorilla Glass with anti-fingerprint Anti-reflection coating Metal-mesh technology
- Sound: Quad speakers 1W dedicated headphone jack Audio Jack Amplifier (tpa6133); 2 noise cancelling microphones
- Input: Fingerprint sensor Hall; Gravity; Light; Gyroscope; Windows Ink Certified N-trig with 1024 pressure levels, 2 buttons stylus pen Wired and wireless backlit keyboard with glass covered precision touchpad with Bluetooth 4.2, connects up to 3 devices
- Camera: Front: 2 MP; Rear: 5 MP
- Connectivity: 2x Full-size USB 3.0 Gen 1 USB 3.0 Gen 1 USB-C port Thunderbolt 3 USB-C; 3.5mm audio port Micro SDXC reader AC (2.4 GHz / 5 GHz); 2x2 MU-MIMOBluetooth; 4.2Miracast wireless display
- Power: 48 W·h (172.8 kJ) battery (12 hours)
- Dimensions: 295.9 millimetres (11.65 in) (w); 205.3 millimetres (8.08 in) (h); 8.9 millimetres (0.35 in) (d)
- Weight: 925 grams (2.039 lb) tablet + 410 grams (0.90 lb) keyboard, 1.335 kilograms (2.94 lb) total

The Eve V is a 2-in-1 detachable personal computer manufactured by Finnish technology company Eve-Tech, released on December 4, 2017.

The computer itself was the first computer to be developed, designed and manufactured in collaboration with the local community through crowdsourcing. Subsequently, it was successfully crowdfunded through Indiegogo. It was designed to in a similar fashion as other 2-in-1 detachable like the Microsoft Surface Pro through a community effort, promising users no bloatware attached.

== History ==
Eve-Tech was founded in December 2013. Their first product, prior to the Eve V, was a Windows 8.1-based tablet computer, the Eve T1, which was announced on December 2, 2014, and released on December 8.

Over the course of time, the V was developed in an open online community with more than 1,000 members collaborating globally with Eve-Tech. The computer was announced in October 2016, and a pre-order campaign was initiated on the crowdfunding platform Indiegogo one month later. The company achieved their funding goal in a matter of 4 minutes and sold out all 500 units.

== Features ==
=== Hardware ===
The Eve V shares some of its design features with similar devices such as Microsoft Surface Pro. The device, however, features an aluminium body which is 0.89 cm thick. The large device comes with a base kit that includes a stylus pen and an Alcantara-covered keyboard.

The device boasts a 12.3-inch, 2880x1920 Sharp IGZO liquid-crystal display with a 1:1500 contrast ratio and 400 nits brightness and an anti-reflective coating for visibility and clarity. The Eve V runs an Intel Core m3, i5, or i7 (up to 3.6 GHz) processor with a 16 GB LPDDR3 RAM and a 512 GB solid-state drive, in the high-end version of the device. The computer's kickstand can be extended from the back end to allow the V to stand in a variety of angles.

Along the sides of Eve V are two USB 3.0 ports, two USB-C 3.1 ports, with one having Thunderbolt 3 connectivity. Furthermore, the device has a standard 3.5mm audio jack and a microSDXC reader. The battery is 48 Wh, with the developers claiming up to 12-hour active usage life. A fingerprint scanner is situated within the power button, located on the right-hand side, making it compatible with Windows Hello and a quadraphonic speaker system. A recent software update has caused Windows Hello to cease working, therefore causing this feature to no longer be usable on the device.

== Software ==
The Eve V has the Windows 10 operating system. An upgrade to the Pro version of 10 is also possible.

== Release ==
The Eve V was released to the public on December 4, 2017.

Currently, it can only be purchased directly from Eve-Tech online, where it has been promoted by periodic flash sales. However, Eve-Tech has experienced difficulties fulfilling orders, drawing complaints from customers who have not seen orders or refunds delivered 18 months after purchase.

== Reception ==
Eve V received positive reviews from critics. Many noted, and even acclaimed, the collaboration between the community and Eve-Tech, as well as its range of I/O ports, hardware, inclusion of a smart keyboard and active pen, build quality and affordability. Many critics were impressed with its value; Upon comparison with the Surface Pro, the V was often favorably received.

Many diverse issues were noted by critics. This includes, but is not limited to, various issues with the keyboard, such as the backspace key — reading "oops!" instead of conventional design, connection issues and its Alcantara design, the speaker system, the flash sale purchase model and the use of Intel Y-series CPU's compared to the Surface Pro's U-series.

While generally well received at launch, there has been widespread concern over Eve-Tech's ability to fulfil its orders due to the long delays faced by many customers. As of fall 2021, not all orders from December 2017 have been delivered.

The orders from the flash sale of 2017 were offered to get a refund or proceed with the orders; however, this promise was not fulfilled for many customers that are still waiting in December 2023.
