= Surface Go 2 =

Tablet computer from Microsoft

- Developer: Microsoft
- Product family: Microsoft Surface
- Type: 2-in-1 detachable tablet computer
- Generation: Second
- Released: 6 May 2020; 6 years ago
- Availability: 12 May 2020; 6 years ago
- Introductory price: USD400 to 730
- Discontinued: Yes
- Operating system: Windows 10 Home S mode (upgradable to Home or Pro)
- CPU: Intel Pentium Gold 4425Y; Intel Core m3 8100Y
- Memory: 8 GB or 4 GB RAM
- Storage: eMMC: 64 GB; SSD: 128 GB, 256 GB
- Removable storage: MicroSDXC
- Display: 10.5 inch Touchscreen; PixelSense Display; 1920 x 1280, (220 ppi); 3:2 Aspect Ratio; Gorilla Glass 3
- Graphics: Intel UHD Graphics 615
- Sound: 2W stereo speakers with Dolby Audio, 3.5 mm headphone jack
- Input: Built in: touchscreen, ambient light sensor, accelerometer, gyroscope, magnetometer Sold separately: type cover, mouse, stylus pen, Surface Dial
- Camera: Front: 5 MP, 1080p HD; Rear: 8 MP, 1080p HD
- Touchpad: On the Surface Type Cover (sold separately)
- Connectivity: WiFi 6, Bluetooth 5, NFC, LTE A, USB C
- Power: 24W
- Online services: Microsoft Store, OneDrive
- Dimensions: 245 mm x 175 mm x 8.3 mm (9.65 in x 6.9 in x 0.33 in)
- Weight: 544 grams (1.199 lb) (WiFi model); 553 grams (1.219 lb) (LTE model)
- Predecessor: Surface Go
- Successor: Surface Go 3
- Related: Surface
- Website: www.surface.com

The Surface Go 2 is a 2-in-1 detachable tablet computer developed by Microsoft. It is the second generation of Surface Go, a smaller alternative to the Surface Pro line. It was announced alongside the Surface Book 3 in May 2020, and superseded by the Surface Go 3 in October 2021.

Surface Go 2 retains the overall dimensions of its predecessor, but with a larger 10.5-inch display, with a higher 1920 x 1280 resolution at 220 ppi, while still maintaining the 3:2 aspect ratio. The updated model offers improved battery life and improved performance, with one model performing 64% faster. It is the first Surface Go to include an Intel Core m processor as an option.

The device shipped with Windows 10 Home in S Mode by default, but can be switched to the full version of Windows 10 Home for free. It features the same 5 MP front-facing camera, 8 MP rear camera and an infrared camera, as the previous model. An NFC chip and a kickstand supporting an angle of up to 165° are also present.

The Surface Go 2 was sold at prices from $399.99 to $729.99, with its detachable keyboard with touchpad and stylus pen sold separately.

== Configuration ==
Surface Go 2 Configuration Options
Price Tier in USD		CPU	GPU	RAM	Internal storage	LTE
Consumer	Commercial	CPU	GPU	RAM	Internal storage	LTE
$400	$450	Intel Pentium Gold 4425Y	Intel UHD Graphics 615 (850 MHz)	4 GB	64 GB eMMC	No
$550		Intel Pentium Gold 4425Y	Intel UHD Graphics 615 (850 MHz)	8 GB	128 GB NVMe SSD	No
	500	Intel Core m3 8100Y	Intel UHD Graphics 615 (900 MHz)	4 GB	64 GB eMMC	No
$630	$680	Intel Core m3 8100Y	Intel UHD Graphics 615 (900 MHz)	8 GB	128 GB NVMe SSD	No
$730	$780	Intel Core m3 8100Y	Intel UHD Graphics 615 (900 MHz)	8 GB	128 GB NVMe SSD	Yes
	$880	Intel Core m3 8100Y	Intel UHD Graphics 615 (900 MHz)	8 GB	256 GB NVMe SSD	Yes

== Features ==
- Windows Hello with IR camera for facial recognition logging in.
- Faster processor with a 64% increase in performance for the top model.
- An Intel Pentium Gold and an Intel Core m3 CPU options with an Intel UHD Graphics 615 GPU.
- Memory options are 4 GB and 8 GB
- Storage options are 64 GB, 128 GB, and 256 GB.
- A headphone jack, a USB-C port, microSD card slot and a nano SIM card tray for the LTE model.
- All configurations can be upgraded to Windows 10 Pro for an additional $50.
- The 8.3 mm thick tablet weighs 544 grams (1.2 pounds).
- Up to 10 hours of typical device usage.

== Hardware ==
The Surface Go 2 is the 5th addition to small Surface lineup. The Surface Go 2 is aimed toward children and students, it is also aimed for schools and the enterprise.

The Surface Go 2 features a bigger screen than its predecessor. It features a full-body magnesium alloy construction. The device features a new and fanless powerful processor, an Intel Core m3 8th gen processor inside. The cheaper models will have an Intel Pentium Gold processor inside.

The device contains USB C port with power delivery and a Surface Connect port. The front-facing camera contains an infrared sensor that supports login using Windows Hello.

The device's Type Cover uses an 8-pin connection which is compatible with the previous model. The keyboard is sold separately at $99.

== Software ==
Surface Go 2 models ship with a pre-installed 64-bit version of Windows 10 Home in S Mode and a 30-day trial of Microsoft 365. Users may only install software from Windows Store. Users can opt out of the S Mode of the OS and upgrade to Home for free or Pro for a fee and be able to install apps from outside the Windows Store.

Windows 10 comes pre-installed with Mail, Calendar, People, Xbox, Photos, Movies and TV, Groove, Your Phone, Office and Edge. The device also supports Windows Hello login using a biometric facial recognition.

== Timeline ==
Timeline of Surface devices
Sources: Microsoft Devices Blog Microsoft Surface Store Microsoft Surface for Business store

Preceded by Surface Go	Surface; 5th generation With: Surface Book 3	Succeeded by Surface Go 3
