= Surface Laptop Studio =

Microsoft laptop

- Developer: Microsoft
- Product family: Microsoft Surface
- Type: Laptop
- Generation: First
- Released: September 22, 2021; 4 years ago
- Availability: October 5, 2021; 4 years ago
- Introductory price: US$1,600 - 3,100
- Operating system: Windows 11 Home (Consumer models); Windows 11 Pro (Business models)
- CPU: Tiger Lake H35 i5-11300H; Tiger Lake H35 i7-11370H
- Memory: 16 GB, 32 GB LPDDR4x RAM
- Storage: 256 GB, 512 GB, 1 TB, 2 TB Removable SSD
- Display: 14.4 inch touchscreen 120 Hz refresh rate PixelSense Flow Display; 2400 x 1600, (201 ppi); 3:2 Aspect Ratio; Dolby Vision
- Graphics: i5: Intel Iris Xe Graphics i7: NVIDIA GeForce RTX 3050 Ti
- Sound: Quad Omnisonic speakers with Dolby Atmos
- Input: Built in: touchscreen, ambient light sensor, accelerometer, gyroscope, magnetometer, dual far-field studio mics Sold Separately: mouse, stylus pen, Surface Dial
- Camera: Front: 1080p HD
- Touchpad: Precision Haptic touchpad
- Connectivity: WiFi 6, Bluetooth 5.1, 2 USB-C with Thunderbolt 4, Xbox Wireless, Headphone jack, Surface connect
- Power: 56.3Wh battery
- Online services: Microsoft Store, OneDrive
- Dimensions: 323.28 mm x 228.32 mm x 18.94 mm (12.72 in x 8.98 in x 0.746 in)
- Weight: i5: 1,742.9 grams (3.842 lb) i7:1,820.2 grams (4.013 lb)
- Predecessor: Surface Book 3
- Successor: Surface Laptop Studio 2
- Website: Business Webpage; Consumer Webpage; Documentation; Product Reveal on YouTube

The Surface Laptop Studio is a 2-in-1 convertible laptop developed by Microsoft. It was announced by the company alongside the Surface Go 3 and Surface Pro 8, Surface Duo 2 and several Surface accessories at their Surface Event on September 22, 2021. The device is a new form factor featuring a dual-pivoting screen that flips into tablet mode. The laptop shipped with Windows 11.

On 4 February, 2022, Microsoft announced the general availability for organizations across industries in the UAE of its Surface Laptop Studio and Surface Pro 8.

Microsoft announced its replacement, the Surface Laptop Studio 2 in September 2023.

== Features ==
- Windows 11 operating system
- Intel Tiger Lake 11th Gen Core i5 or Core i7 processor
- Intel Iris Xe graphics, Nvidia GeForce RTX 3050 Ti (Consumer), or NVIDIA RTX A2000 (Enterprise) GPU with 4 GB of GDDR6 RAM
- 120 Hz refresh rate and Dolby Vision support
- 16 or 32 GB of LPDDR4X RAM
- 256 GB to 2 TB NVME SSD storage
- 2 Thunderbolt 4 USB-C ports

== Configurations ==
Surface Laptop Studio Configuration Options
Price Tier in USD		CPU	GPU			RAM	Internal storage
Consumer	Business	CPU	GPU			RAM	Internal storage
$1,600	$1,700	Intel Core i5-11300H	Intel Iris Xe (80 EU @ 1.3 GHz)			16 GB	256 GB
$1,800	$1,900	Intel Core i5-11300H	Intel Iris Xe (80 EU @ 1.3 GHz)			16 GB	512 GB
$2,100	$2,200	Intel Core i7-11370H	NVIDIA GeForce RTX 3050 Ti (4 GB GDDR6)	+	Intel Iris Xe (96 EU @ 1.35 GHz)	16 GB	512 GB
$2,700	$2,800	Intel Core i7-11370H	NVIDIA GeForce RTX 3050 Ti (4 GB GDDR6)	+	Intel Iris Xe (96 EU @ 1.35 GHz)	32 GB	1 TB
$3,100	$3,200	Intel Core i7-11370H	NVIDIA GeForce RTX 3050 Ti (4 GB GDDR6)	+	Intel Iris Xe (96 EU @ 1.35 GHz)	32 GB	2 TB
	$3,400	Intel Core i7-11370H	NVIDIA RTX A2000 (4 GB GDDR6)	+	Intel Iris Xe (96 EU @ 1.35 GHz)	32 GB	1 TB
	$3,800	Intel Core i7-11370H	NVIDIA RTX A2000 (4 GB GDDR6)	+	Intel Iris Xe (96 EU @ 1.35 GHz)	32 GB	2 TB

== Hardware ==
- A new three-position display with a complete overhaul.
- 14.4-inch touch display with 2400 x 1600 pixels (201 ppi) and a 3:2 aspect ratio
- The first Surface Laptop to contain 2 USB-C ports with Thunderbolt 4.
- It comes with a removable SSD.
- Precision Haptic touchpad

== Software ==
The Surface Laptop Studio will be powered by the new Windows 11 operating system with a 30-day trial of Microsoft 365. Consumer models will get the Home edition and the business models will get the Pro edition of the operating system. The device also supports Windows Hello login using biometric facial recognition.

== Timeline ==
Timeline of Surface devices
Sources: Microsoft Devices Blog Microsoft Surface Store Microsoft Surface for Business store

Preceded by Surface Book 3	Surface Laptop Studio; 1st generation With: Surface Pro 8, Surface Go 3, Surface Duo 2	Succeeded by Surface Laptop Studio 2
