= Surface Pro 7 =

2-in-1 detachable tablet computer developed by Microsoft

Surface Pro 7 | Pro 7+
- Developer: Microsoft
- Product family: Microsoft Surface
- Type: 2-in-1 detachable
- Generation: Seventh
- Released: Pro 7: 2 October 2019; 6 years ago Pro 7+: 11 January 2021; 5 years ago
- Availability: Pro 7: 22 October 2019; 6 years ago Pro 7+: 15 January 2021; 5 years ago
- Introductory price: Pro 7: USD 750 to 2,400; Pro 7+: USD 900 to 2,800
- Operating system: Windows 10 Home or Pro (Upgradeable to Windows 11); Windows 11 Home or Pro
- CPU: Pro 7: Intel Core i3-1005G1, i5-1035G4, i7-1065G7; Pro 7+: Intel Core i3-1115G4, i5-1135G7, i7-1165G7
- Memory: Pro 7: 4 GB, 8 GB, 16 GB LPDDR4x RAM; Pro 7+: 8 GB, 16 GB, 32 GB LPDDR4x RAM
- Storage: Pro 7: 128 GB, 256 GB, 512 GB, or 1 TB SSD; Pro 7+: 128 GB, 256 GB, 512 GB, or 1 TB Removable SSD
- Removable storage: Pro 7: microSD; Pro 7+: SSD, microSD (Wi-Fi models only)
- Display: 12.3 inch touchscreen PixelSense Display; 2736 x 1824, 267 PPI; 3:2 Aspect Ratio
- Graphics: Pro 7 i3: Intel UHD Graphics; Pro 7 i5: Intel Iris Plus; Pro 7 i7: Intel Iris Plus; Pro 7+ i5: Iris Xe; Pro 7+ i7: Iris Xe
- Sound: Omnisonic Speakers with Dolby Audio, 3.5 mm headphone jack
- Input: Built in: touchscreen, ambient light sensor, accelerometer, gyroscope, magnetometer Sold Separately: type cover, mouse, stylus pen, Surface Dial
- Camera: Front: 5 MP, 1080p HD; Rear: 8 MP, 1080p HD
- Touchpad: On the Surface Type Cover (sold separately)
- Connectivity: WiFi 6, Bluetooth 5, USB-C, LTE
- Online services: Microsoft Store, OneDrive
- Dimensions: 292 mm × 201 mm × 8.5 mm (11.5 in x 7.9 in x 0.33 in)
- Weight: i3: 775 grams (1.709 lb) i5: 775 grams (1.709 lb) i7: 790 grams (1.74 lb)
- Predecessor: Surface Pro 6
- Successor: Surface Pro 8
- Related: Surface Pro X
- Website: www.surface.com

The Surface Pro 7 is a 2-in-1 detachable tablet computer developed by Microsoft. It is the seventh generation of Surface Pro and was announced alongside the Surface Laptop 3 and Surface Pro X at an event on 2 October 2019. An updated version of the device was introduced on 11 January 2021 called the Surface Pro 7+. Surface Pro 7 and 7+ maintain the same form and design as previous models but with the Mini DisplayPort receptacle replaced by a USB-C port. The display of the device is the same as the previous model with a 2736 x 1824 resolution touchscreen in 3:2 aspect ratio and 267 ppi. The Surface Pro 7 starts at $750 and goes up to $2,300. The Surface Pro 7+ for Business starts at $900 and goes up to $2,800.

Microsoft started offering the Surface Pro 7+ to consumers as announced at their Surface Event on September 22, 2021.

== Hardware ==
- The Surface Pro 7 is the 7th addition to Surface Pro lineup. The tablet is aimed towards professionals while the Surface Pro 7+ an updated version aimed towards the enterprise.
- The Surface Pro 7+ comes with a removable SSD while the Surface Pro 7 does not.
- Both are available with a 12.3-inch LCD touchscreen display and features a full-body magnesium alloy construction in platinum and black finish.
- The device is the first Surface Pro to contain a USB-C port with power delivery.
- The kickstand is still present just like previous models and unfolds from 0 degrees to 165 degrees.
- The Surface Pro 7 includes 1 USB-C port, 1 USB A port, 1 3.5 mm audio port, 1 microSD card port (non-LTE models), and a Surface Connect port.
- The Surface Pro 7 size is 11.5 x 7.9 x 0.33 inches and weighs ~1.7 pounds.
- The Surface Pro 7's battery is 43.2Wh which offers battery life of ~8 hours. The Surface Pro 7+ for Business battery is 50.4Wh for even longer life.

== Software ==
Surface Pro 7+ for Business models ship with a pre-installed 64-bit version of Windows 10 Pro; consumer models ship with a pre-installed 64-bit version of Windows 10 Home. Windows 10 comes pre-installed with Mail, Calendar, People, Xbox, Photos, Movies and TV, Groove, Your Phone, a 30-day trial of Office 365, and the Edge browser. The device also supports Windows Hello login using biometric facial recognition.

== Configuration ==
Surface Pro 7 and Pro 7+ Configuration Options
Price Tier in USD		Version	CPU	GPU	RAM	Internal storage	LTE	Fanless	Color	
Consumer	Business	Version	CPU	GPU	RAM	Internal storage	LTE	Fanless	Color	
TBA	$900	Surface Pro 7+	Intel Core i3-1115G4	Intel UHD Graphics (48 execution units @1.25 GHz)	8 GB	128 GB	No	Yes	P	
TBA	$1,000	Surface Pro 7+	Intel Core i5-1135G7	Intel Iris Xe Graphics (80 execution units @1.3 GHz)	8 GB	128 GB	No	Yes	P	
TBA	$1,150	Surface Pro 7+	Intel Core i5-1135G7	Intel Iris Xe Graphics (80 execution units @1.3 GHz)	8 GB	128 GB	Yes	Yes	P	
TBA	$1,300	Surface Pro 7+	Intel Core i5-1135G7	Intel Iris Xe Graphics (80 execution units @1.3 GHz)	8 GB	256 GB	No	Yes	P	B
TBA	$1,450	Surface Pro 7+	Intel Core i5-1135G7	Intel Iris Xe Graphics (80 execution units @1.3 GHz)	8 GB	256 GB	Yes	Yes	P	
TBA	$1,500	Surface Pro 7+	Intel Core i5-1135G7	Intel Iris Xe Graphics (80 execution units @1.3 GHz)	16 GB	256 GB	No	Yes	P	
TBA	$1,650	Surface Pro 7+	Intel Core i5-1135G7	Intel Iris Xe Graphics (80 execution units @1.3 GHz)	16 GB	256 GB	Yes	Yes	P	
TBA	$1,600	Surface Pro 7+	Intel Core i7-1165G7	Intel Iris Xe Graphics (96 execution units @1.3GHz)	16 GB	256 GB	No	No	P	B
TBA	$2,000	Surface Pro 7+	Intel Core i7-1165G7	Intel Iris Xe Graphics (96 execution units @1.3GHz)	16 GB	512 GB	No	No	P	B
TBA	$2,400	Surface Pro 7+	Intel Core i7-1165G7	Intel Iris Xe Graphics (96 execution units @1.3GHz)	16 GB	1 TB	No	No	P	
TBA	$2,800	Surface Pro 7+	Intel Core i7-1165G7	Intel Iris Xe Graphics (96 execution units @1.3GHz)	32 GB	1 TB	No	No	P	
$750	$850	Surface Pro 7	Intel Core i3-1005G1	Intel UHD Graphics (32 execution units @900 MHz)	4 GB	128 GB	No	Yes	P	
$900	$1,000	Surface Pro 7	Intel Core i5-1035G4	Intel Iris Plus Graphics (48 execution units @1.05 GHz)	8 GB	128 GB	No	Yes	P	
$1,200	$1,300	Surface Pro 7	Intel Core i5-1035G4	Intel Iris Plus Graphics (48 execution units @1.05 GHz)	8 GB	256 GB	No	Yes	P	B
$1,400	$1,500	Surface Pro 7	Intel Core i5-1035G4	Intel Iris Plus Graphics (48 execution units @1.05 GHz)	16 GB	256 GB	No	Yes	P	
$1,500	$1,600	Surface Pro 7	Intel Core i7-1065G7	Intel Iris Plus Graphics (64 execution units @1.1 GHz)	16 GB	256 GB	No	No	P	B
$1,900	$2,000	Surface Pro 7	Intel Core i7-1065G7	Intel Iris Plus Graphics (64 execution units @1.1 GHz)	16 GB	512 GB	No	No	P	B
$2,300	$2,400	Surface Pro 7	Intel Core i7-1065G7	Intel Iris Plus Graphics (64 execution units @1.1 GHz)	16 GB	1 TB	No	No	P	

Platinum Black
Consumer models come preloaded with Windows 10 Home
Business models come preloaded with Windows 10 Pro

== Timeline ==
Timeline of Surface devices
Sources: Microsoft Devices Blog Microsoft Surface Store Microsoft Surface for Business store

Preceded by Surface Pro 6	Surface Pro; 7th generation With: Surface Laptop 3, Surface Pro X	Succeeded by Surface Pro 8
