= SP2 =

SP2 may refer to:

- SP2 Life - Raw Fresh Spirulina producer - sp2life.com
- The University of Pennsylvania School of Social Policy and Practice, nicknamed SP2
- Spider-Man 2
- sp² bond, any bond which involves a sp² orbital
- Sp2 transcription factor, a human gene
- Honda VTR1000 SP-2, known as the RC51 in some markets, a 1000cc V-twin sports motorcycle produced between 2000 and 2006.
- i-mate SP2, the second smartphone model released by i-mate
- Savoia-Pomilio SP.2, a reconnaissance and bomber aircraft built in Italy during the First World War
- USS Lynx (SP-2), armed motorboat that served in the United States Navy as a patrol vessel and aviation support craft from 1917 to 1919
- Vektor SP1/SP2, a pistol
- Volkswagen SP2, a sports car developed by Volkswagen do Brasil
- IBM RS/6000 SP, supercomputer series with SP2 model
- SuperPower 2, a real-time strategy game
- Service pack 2, a collection of software updates
- a postal district in the SP postcode area in England
- a model of steam toy made by British manufacturer Mamod
- an abandoned sink in the Sima Pumacocha, a cave in Peru
- Steel Panthers 2: Modern Battles, a 1996 computer war game in the Steel Panthers series
- Surface Pro 2, a laplet by Microsoft
