= Surface Laptop Ultra =

2026 laptop by Microsoft

- Developer: Microsoft
- Product family: Microsoft Surface
- Type: Laptop
- Released: 16 October 2026; 18 days ago
- Availability: Preorders opened 7 October 2026; 27 days ago
- Introductory price: USD $2,599 – $5,899.99
- Operating system: Windows 11 Home (base configuration); Windows 11 Pro (32 GB models and above)
- System on a chip: Nvidia RTX Spark (18-core or 20-core Grace CPU with Blackwell RTX GPU)
- Memory: 24, 32, 48, 64 or 128 GB unified memory
- Storage: 512 GB, 1 TB or 2 TB, user-replaceable SSD
- Display: 15-inch mini-LED PixelSense Ultra touchscreen 3:2 aspect ratio, 3270 × 2180 pixels, 262 PPI; Up to 2,000 nits peak HDR brightness, 120 Hz
- Predecessor: Surface Laptop Studio 2
- Related: Surface RTX Spark Dev Box
- Website: Official website

The Surface Laptop Ultra is a laptop developed by Microsoft as part of its Surface line. It was initially teased in May 2026, as one of the first laptops built around Nvidia's RTX Spark system on chip, and was released on October 16, 2026.

== Specifications ==
The Surface Laptop Ultra is built around Nvidia's RTX Spark, an Arm-based system on chip combining a Grace central processing unit with a Blackwell RTX graphics processor. The base configuration uses an 18-core CPU, while higher configurations use a 20-core CPU paired with a 6,144-core GPU.

Memory configurations range from 24 GB to 128 GB of unified memory, and storage options range from 512 GB to 2 TB on a user-replaceable solid-state drive. The 15-inch display is a mini-LED PixelSense Ultra touchscreen with a 3:2 aspect ratio, a native resolution of 3270 × 2180 pixels, a 120 Hz refresh rate and up to 2,000 nits of peak HDR brightness.

Connectivity includes three USB-C ports (one of which supports Microsoft's magnetic charging in place of the earlier proprietary Surface Connect port), one USB-A port, an HDMI port, a full-size SD card reader and a 3.5 mm headphone jack. The laptop weighs under 4.5 pounds (2 kg) and is under 18 mm thick, and is available in Platinum or a new Nightfall finish.

== Pricing ==
At launch, Microsoft offered eight configurations, starting at $2,599 for an 18-core model with 24 GB of memory and 512 GB of storage, and rising to $5,899.99 for a 20-core model with 128 GB of memory and 1 TB of storage. Configurations with 32 GB of memory or more ship with Windows 11 Pro rather than Windows 11 Home.

== Reception ==
Reviewing a top-specification unit ahead of launch, Tom's Hardware found the Surface Laptop Ultra faster than a 14-inch MacBook Pro with Apple's M5 Max chip and substantially faster than an AMD Ryzen AI Max+ 395 desktop system on local, on-device large-language-model benchmarks, completing agentic AI test tasks in roughly 25% less time than the MacBook Pro. The review was more critical of gaming performance: it found that RTX Spark's shared memory bandwidth is well below that of a dedicated mobile GPU of comparable core count, and that CPU-heavy titles such as Gears of War: E-Day, which run through Windows' Prism x86 emulator rather than natively on the Arm chip, struggled to use the GPU fully and experienced stability issues during testing.

Gizmodo praised the bright and HDR capable screen, stating that it was "unquestionably the brightest screen ever put in a laptop", but they noted how reflection-prone it was. The speaker was similarly praised, being second only to the 16-inch M5 Macbook Pro. They criticized the lackluster webcam and the power button location. The low 80 watt power limit and potential emulation incompatibility were noted as a problem for gaming.

== Related devices ==
Microsoft also sells the Surface RTX Spark Dev Box, a compact developer system built on RTX Spark with 128 GB of unified memory, for preorder at $5,999.

== See also ==
- Microsoft Surface
- Nvidia RTX Spark
- Qualcomm Snapdragon
