= Dehlin =

Dehlin is a surname. Notable people with the surname include:

- Joel Dehlin, American entrepreneur
- John Dehlin (born 1969), American podcast host
