= Surface Pro 8 =

Eighth generation of Microsoft Surface Pro

- Developer: Microsoft
- Product family: Microsoft Surface
- Type: 2-in-1 detachable
- Generation: Eight
- Released: 22 September 2021; 4 years ago
- Availability: 5 October 2021; 4 years ago
- Introductory price: Aud 1100 to 2600
- Operating system: Windows 11 Home or Pro
- CPU: Intel Core i7-1185G7; Intel Core i5-1135G7; Intel Core i3-1115G4
- Memory: 8 GB, 16 GB, 32 GB LPDDR4x RAM
- Storage: 512 GB or 1 TB; 128 GB or 256 GB Removable SSD
- Display: 13 inch touchscreen 120 Hz refresh rate PixelSense Display; 2880 x 1920, 267 PPI; 3:2 Aspect Ratio 3K Resolution
- Graphics: Iris Xe
- Sound: 2W stereo speakers with Dolby Atmos, 3.5 mm headphone jack
- Input: Built in: touchscreen, ambient light sensor, accelerometer, gyroscope, magnetometer, dual far-field studio mics Sold Separately: type cover, mouse, stylus pen, Surface Dial
- Camera: Front: 5 MP, 1080p HD; Rear: 10 MP, 4K
- Touchpad: On the Surface Type Cover (sold separately)
- Connectivity: WiFi 6, Bluetooth 5.1, 2 USB-C with Thunderbolt (interface), LTE
- Online services: Microsoft Store, OneDrive
- Dimensions: 287 mm x 208 mm x 9.3 mm (11.3 in x 8.2 in x 0.37 in)
- Weight: 889 grams (1.960 lb)
- Predecessor: Surface Pro 7 | Pro 7+ Surface Pro X
- Successor: Surface Pro 9
- Related: Surface
- Website: www.surface.com

The Microsoft Surface Pro 8 is a 2-in-1 detachable tablet computer developed by Microsoft to supersede the Surface Pro 7. It combines the form factor and exterior design of the Surface Pro X with internal Intel-based hardware of the Pro 7+. It was announced on September 22, 2021 alongside the Surface Go 3, updated Surface Pro X models, a new Surface Laptop Studio, Surface Duo 2, Surface Slim Pen 2, and several other accessories. The tablet uses the Windows 11 operating system.

On 4 Feb, 2022, Microsoft announced the general availability for organisations across industries in the UAE of its Surface Laptop Studio and Surface Pro 8.

== Configurations ==
Surface Pro 8 configuration options
Price tier in $US		CPU	GPU	RAM	Internal storage	LTE	Color	
Consumer	Business	CPU	GPU	RAM	Internal storage	LTE	Color	
	$1,100	Intel Core i3-1115G4	Intel UHD Graphics (48 EU @ 1.25 GHz)	8 GB	128 GB	No	G	
$1,100	$1,200	Intel Core i5-1135G7(Consumer) or Intel Core i5-1145G7 (Business)	Intel Iris Xe (80 EU @ 1.30 GHz)	8 GB	128 GB	No		P
$1,200	$1,300	Intel Core i5-1135G7(Consumer) or Intel Core i5-1145G7 (Business)	Intel Iris Xe (80 EU @ 1.30 GHz)	8 GB	256 GB	No	G	P
	$1,350	Intel Core i5-1135G7(Consumer) or Intel Core i5-1145G7 (Business)	Intel Iris Xe (80 EU @ 1.30 GHz)	8 GB	128 GB	Yes		P
	$1,450	Intel Core i5-1135G7(Consumer) or Intel Core i5-1145G7 (Business)	Intel Iris Xe (80 EU @ 1.30 GHz)	8 GB	256 GB	Yes		P
$1,400	$1,500	Intel Core i5-1135G7(Consumer) or Intel Core i5-1145G7 (Business)	Intel Iris Xe (80 EU @ 1.30 GHz)	8 GB	512 GB	No	G	P
$1,400	$1,500	Intel Core i5-1135G7(Consumer) or Intel Core i5-1145G7 (Business)	Intel Iris Xe (80 EU @ 1.30 GHz)	16 GB	256 GB	No	G	P
	$1,650	Intel Core i5-1135G7(Consumer) or Intel Core i5-1145G7 (Business)	Intel Iris Xe (80 EU @ 1.30 GHz)	16 GB	256 GB	Yes		P
$1,600	$1,700	Intel Core i7-1185G7	Intel Iris Xe (96 EU @ 1.35 GHz)	16 GB	256 GB	No	G	P
	$1,850	Intel Core i7-1185G7	Intel Iris Xe (96 EU @ 1.35 GHz)	16 GB	256 GB	Yes		P
$1,900	$2,000	Intel Core i7-1185G7	Intel Iris Xe (96 EU @ 1.35 GHz)	16 GB	512 GB	No	G	P
$2,200	$2,300	Intel Core i7-1185G7	Intel Iris Xe (96 EU @ 1.35 GHz)	16 GB	1 TB	No		P
$2,600	$2,700	Intel Core i7-1185G7	Intel Iris Xe (96 EU @ 1.35 GHz)	32 GB	1 TB	No		P

Graphite Platinum

== Hardware ==
- The Surface Pro 8 is the 10th addition to the Surface Pro lineup preceded by the Surface Pro 7+ and Surface Pro X.
- An updated design that aligns closer to the previously launched Surface Pro X.
- Intel 11th Gen Core i3, i5, or i7 processors
- 13-inch touchscreen at 267 PPI, 3:2 aspect ratio, and 120 Hz refresh rate
- Up to 1 TB of removable SSD storage
- Up to 32 GB of memory
- 4K video camera support
- Unlike previous Surface Pro models, a microSD card slot is not included.
- The device is the first Surface Pro to include two USB-C ports with Thunderbolt 4.
- Like previous models, the built-in kickstand unfolds from 0 degrees to 165 degrees.
- 51.5 watt-hour battery

== Software ==
Surface Pro 8 is powered by the new Windows 11 Home operating system (Windows 11 Pro or Windows 10 Pro for business models) with a 30-day trial of Microsoft 365. The device also supports Windows Hello login using biometric facial recognition.

== Timeline ==
Timeline of Surface devices
Sources: Microsoft Devices Blog Microsoft Surface Store Microsoft Surface for Business store

Preceded by Surface Pro 7 | Pro 7+	Surface Pro; 8th generation With: Surface Laptop Studio, Surface Go 3, Surface Duo 2	Succeeded by Surface Pro 9
