= Center for Advanced Engineering Environments =

Coordinates: 37.061952°N 76.414818°W

The Center for Advanced Engineering Environments (CAEE) is a department center of the Frank Batten College of Engineering and Technology at Old Dominion University. The center was created in 2001 and conducts research activities related to collaborative distributed knowledge discovery and exploitation, interactive visual simulations, intelligent synthesis, and advanced learning/training technologies and environments and their application to future complex engineering systems.

The EON Reality Touchlight system showing a 3D model of a jet engine.

The activities of the center include the synergistic coupling of modeling, visual simulations, intelligent agents, multimedia and synthetic environments, human-technology interactions, computational intelligence, computational, information, and collaboration technologies in the multidisciplinary analysis, sensitivity studies, optimization, design, and operation of complex engineering systems.

The Center is located at the Old Dominion University Peninsula Higher Education Center in Hampton, Virginia. It is located very close to NASA's Langley Research Center.

== Objectives ==
The Center has the following five specific objectives:

1. Conduct innovative research on applications of the aforementioned areas to complex engineering systems.
2. Develop innovative paradigms, technologies, and strategies for Advanced Learning/Training Environments.
3. Act as a pathfinder, by demonstrating to the research community what can be done (high-potential, high-risk research).
4. Help in identifying future directions of research, and future interdisciplinary areas, in support of future complex engineering systems.
5. Form strategic partnerships with technology providers, and industry and research organizations to accelerate technology and workforce development.

The Powerwall 3D environment

In addition to research, the activities of the Center include forming strategic partnerships and collaborative agreements with leading universities, industry, and software vendors who are developing collaborative distributed knowledge discovery and exploitation systems and intelligent synthesis environments for future aerospace and other high-tech engineering systems; organizing workshops and national symposia; and writing monographs and special publications on timely topics.

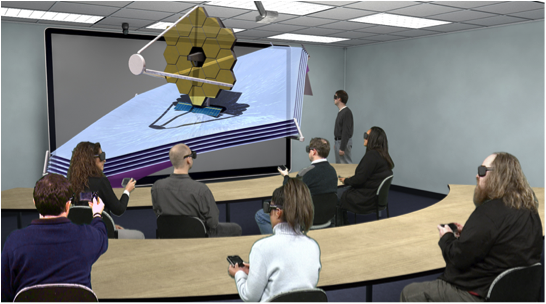
Immersive Classroom Concept

== Research ==
The current research activities of the center include:

- Collaborative distributed engineering knowledge discovery and exploitation
- Interactive distributed visual simulation environment and 3D virtual worlds
- Pervasive blended lifelong cyberlearning (using learning and research networks, personal/collaborative learning environments, 3D interactive immersive classrooms, and other emerging learning spaces/platforms)
- Distributed heterogeneous augmented and hyper-reality systems
- Brain-based, intelligent, and multimodal human-technology interfaces
- Intelligent, adaptive cyber-physical ecosystems and emergent engineering

The Eon Reality iCatcher portable 3D display system

== Facilities ==
The CAEE website provides the following facilities:

- Comprehensive Information Retrieval
- Intelligent Question/Answering – Search Facility
- Patent Applications/Filings Search Facility
- Space and Technology News and Blog Alerts
- Knowledge Repositories
- Links to Multimedia Sites
  - NASA Sites
  - International Space Agencies
  - Other Sites
