= Surface Go =

2-in-1 detachable in the Microsoft Surface series

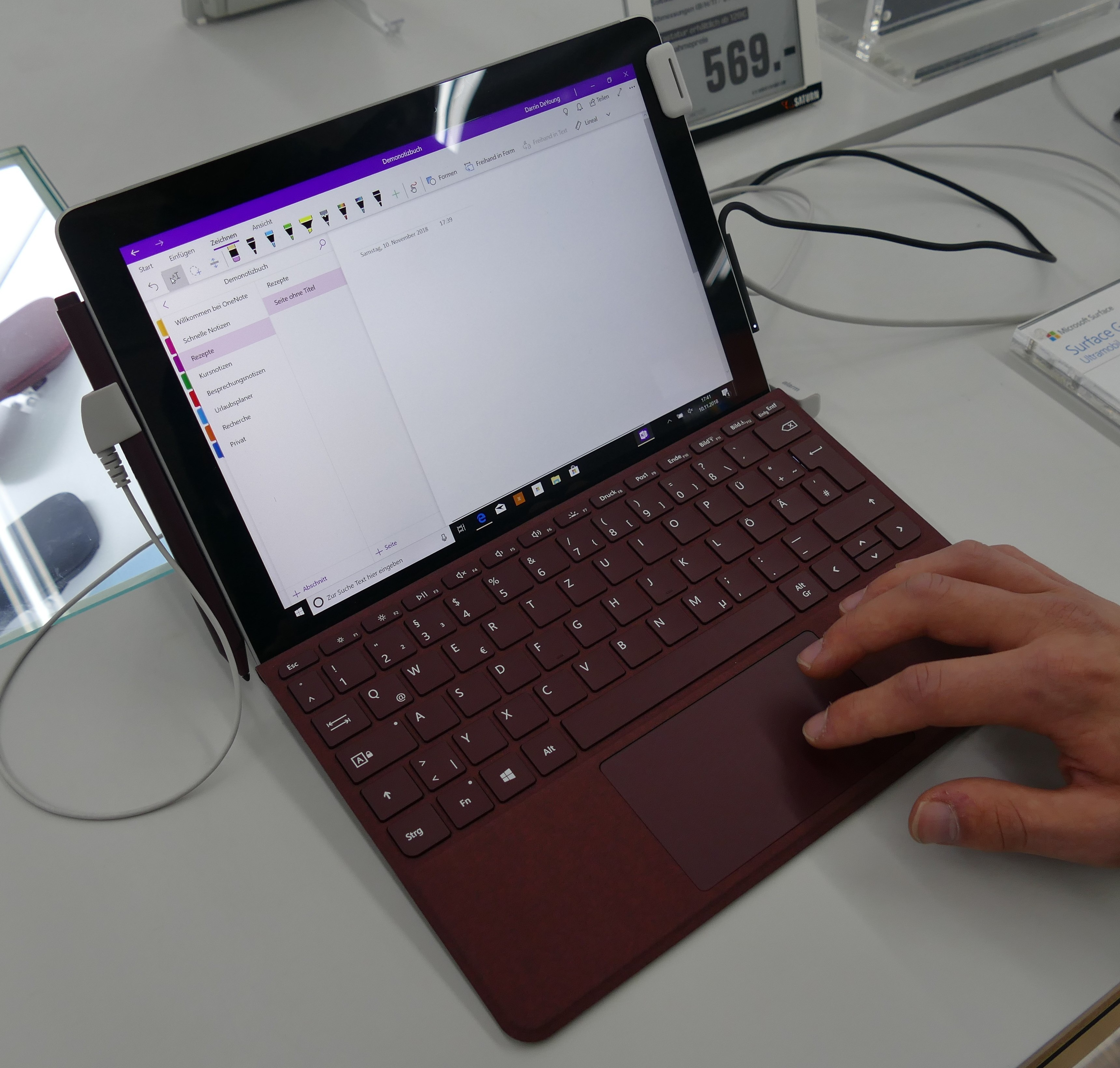
- Surface Go with burgundy Type Cover
- Developer: Microsoft
- Product family: Microsoft Surface
- Type: 2-in-1 detachable tablet computer
- Generation: First
- Released: August 2, 2018; 7 years ago
- Introductory price: USD 399
- Discontinued: Yes
- Operating system: Windows 10 Home S mode (upgradable to Home or Pro)
- CPU: Intel Pentium Gold 4415Y; 1.6GHz, 2 MB cache, 6 W
- Memory: 8 GB or 4 GB RAM
- Storage: NVMe SSD: 128 GB, 256 GB eMMC: 64 GB
- Removable storage: MicroSDXC
- Display: 10-inch Touchscreen; PixelSense Display; 1800 × 1200, 217 PPI; 3:2 Aspect Ratio; Gorilla Glass 3
- Graphics: Intel HD Graphics 615
- Sound: 2W stereo speakers with Dolby Audio, 3.5 mm headphone jack, Single microphone
- Input: Built in: touchscreen, ambient light sensor, accelerometer, gyroscope, magnetometer Sold separately: type cover, mouse, stylus pen, Surface Dial
- Camera: Front: 5 MP, 1080p HD; Rear: 8 MP, 1080p HD
- Touchpad: Surface Type Cover (sold separately)
- Connectivity: WiFi 5, Bluetooth 5, NFC, LTE A, USB C
- Online services: Microsoft Store, OneDrive
- Dimensions: 245 mm × 175 mm × 8.3 mm (9.65 in × 6.89 in × 0.33 in)
- Weight: 522 grams (1.151 lb) (WiFi tablet); 532 grams (1.173 lb) (LTE tablet); 245 grams (0.540 lb) (Type cover)
- Predecessor: Surface 3
- Successor: Surface Go 2
- Related: Surface
- Website: www.surface.com

The Surface Go is a 10-inch (250 mm) 2-in-1 detachable in the Microsoft Surface series that was released on August 2, 2018. It was unveiled by Microsoft on July 10, 2018. It was the first generation of the Surface Go. In May 2020, the Surface Go was superseded by the Surface Go 2.

The device runs Windows 10 Home in S-Mode and features a 5MP front facing camera, an infrared camera, 8 MP rear camera, a NFC chip and a kickstand supporting an angle of up to 165°. The screen is a 3:2 optically-bonded PixelSense 1800 × 1200 display with a density of 217 PPI and a full 180 degree viewing angle. The Surface Go starts at US$399 and does not include a Type Cover or Surface Pen, which must be purchased separately. The Type Cover is offered in black, plus three options with Alcantara fabric—Burgundy, Cobalt Blue, and Platinum. The Type Cover also uses an 8-pin connection instead of the 6-pin connection featured in past Surfaces, breaking compatibility with other models.

== Configuration ==
Surface Go Configuration Options
Price Tier in USD		CPU	Integrated GPU	RAM	Internal Storage	LTE
Consumer	Business	CPU	Integrated GPU	RAM	Internal Storage	LTE
$400	$450	Intel Pentium Gold 4415Y	Intel HD Graphics 615	4 GB	64GB eMMC	No
$500		Intel Pentium Gold 4415Y	Intel HD Graphics 615	4 GB	128 GB NVMe SSD	No
$550	$600	Intel Pentium Gold 4415Y	Intel HD Graphics 615	8 GB	128 GB NVMe SSD	No
$680	$730	Intel Pentium Gold 4415Y	Intel HD Graphics 615	8 GB	128 GB NVMe SSD	Yes
$780	$830	Intel Pentium Gold 4415Y	Intel HD Graphics 615	8 GB	256 GB NVMe SSD	Yes

== Features ==
- Surface Go has an Intel Pentium Gold Processor 4415Y and Intel HD Graphics 615 GPU. Storage options are 64 GB, 128 GB, and 256 GB.
- Surface Go can fully charge its battery in 2 hours.
- Surface Go comes with a headphone jack, a USB-C port, and a microSD card slot.
- All configurations are also available with Windows 10 Pro for an additional US$50.
- The 8.3 mm thick tablet weighs 0.52 kg (1.15 lb).
- The Surface Go has either 4 GB or 8 GB of RAM

== Hardware ==
The Surface Go is the 4th addition to small Surface lineup featuring a full-body magnesium alloy construction. The Surface Go is aimed toward children, students and schools.

The device features a fanless Intel Pentium Gold processor inside.

For the first time, the device contains USB C port with power delivery, the first Surface device to support such port and a Surface Connect port. The front-facing camera contains an infrared sensor that supports login using Windows Hello.

The detachable keyboard, which is sold separately, uses an 8-pin connection which is compatible with the newer model.

== Software ==
Surface Go comes pre-installed with Windows 10 Home in S Mode and a 30-day trial of Office 365. With S Mode, users may only install software from Windows Store. S Mode of the OS can be upgraded to Windows 10 Home for free or Windows 10 Pro for a fee.

Windows 10 comes pre-installed with Mail, Calendar, People, Xbox, Photos, Movies and TV, Groove, Office and Edge. The device also supports Windows Hello login using a biometric facial recognition.

== Timeline ==
Timeline of Surface devices
Sources: Microsoft Devices Blog Microsoft Surface Store Microsoft Surface for Business store

Preceded by Surface 3	Surface; 4th generation alongside Surface Laptop 3	Succeeded by Surface Go 2
