= Compaq Concerto =

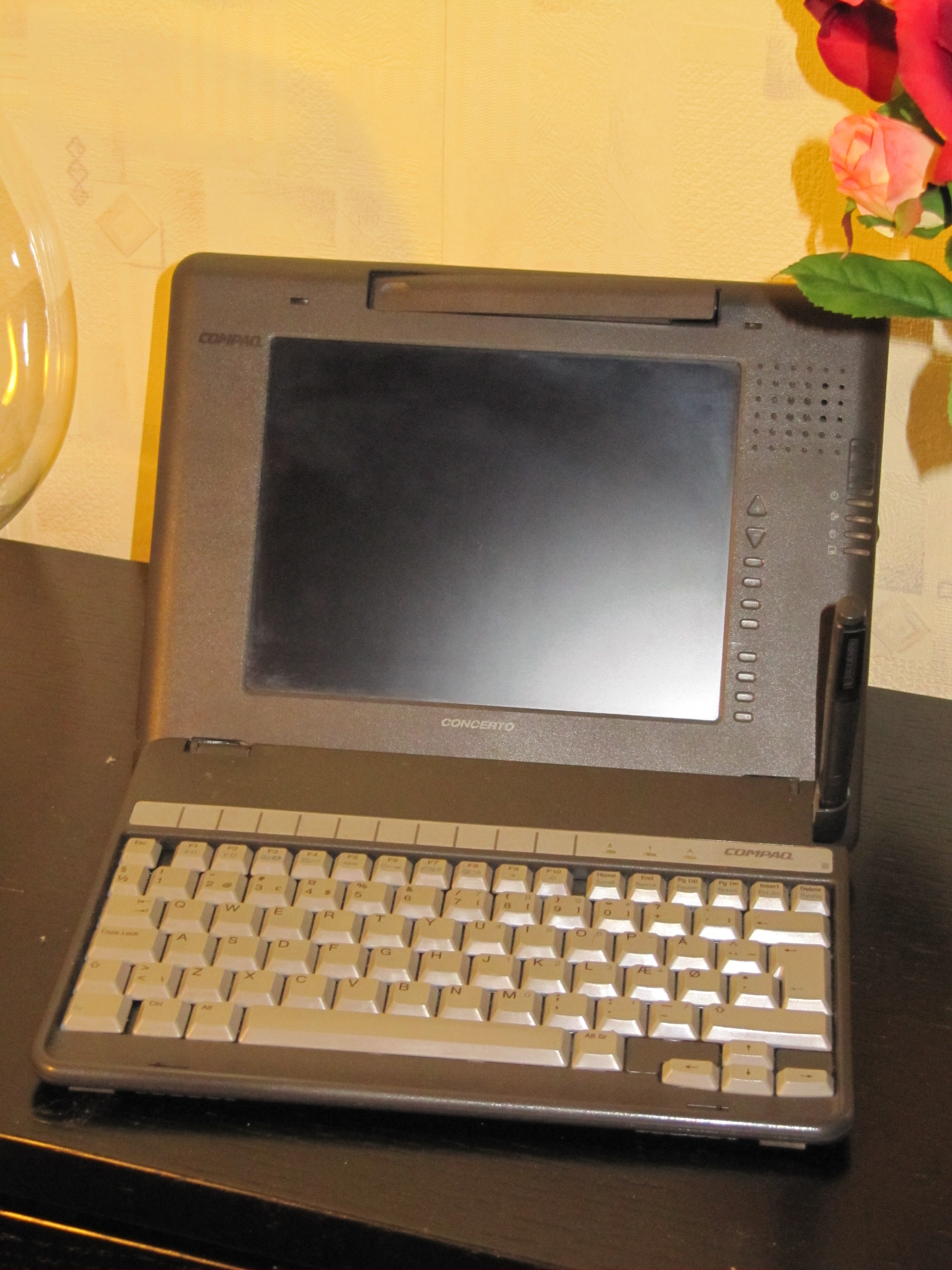
- Compaq Concerto
- Released: 1993; 33 years ago
- Operating system: MS-DOS 6.2 / Windows for Pen Computing 1.0 (based on Windows 3.1)
- CPU: Intel Intel 80486, 25 or 33 Mhz
- Memory: 4 MB
- Storage: 120 MB hard drive; internal 3.5" floppy drive, 1.44 MB
- Display: VGA: 640×480 grayscale
- Touchpad: 83 keys, QWERTY
- Weight: 2kg
- Successor: Compaq TC1000 (2003)

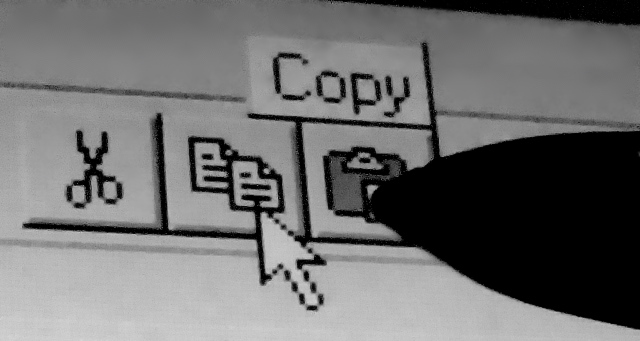
The Compaq Concerto pen could control the pointer from 1 cm away, so that the tooltip text could be displayed when the pen was 1 cm away from clicking.

The Compaq Concerto was a detachable laptop computer made by Compaq, introduced in 1993. Concerto was the first tablet computer manufactured by Compaq on a large scale, and can be considered a very early form of a 2-in-1 PC.

== Specifications ==
There were three Concerto models, varying in hard disk capacity, and processor speed. All had 4 MB of RAM soldered to the motherboard, which was expandable to 20 MB using proprietary memory modules.

There were two processor options: Intel 486SL @ 25 MHz or 33 MHz. The 25-MHz model was available with either a 120-MB or 240-MB IDE hard disk drive, and the 33-MHz model had a 240-MB IDE hard disk drive. Both models had a built in 3.5" 1.44-MB floppy disk drive.

All models shipped with MS-DOS 6.2, with Compaq's unique set of DOS extensions for power management, configuration and model specific help. Windows for Pen Computing Version 1, which was Windows 3.1 with necessary add-ons for pen operation — including handwriting recognition - was also pre-installed. The Concerto was made with some help from Wacom and their associates

- Modem: Internal modem was available as add-on
- PCMCIA: two Type II PCMCIA slots, could also be used as a single Type III PCMCIA slot
- Docking Station: a Concerto specific docking station was available

The Concerto was not a very successful laptop, but it did have some special features: a detachable keyboard, and a pen & touch screen (the touch screen only worked with the special pen). It could be considered to be ahead of its time.

Its screen had Wacom functionality as mentioned above

- The pen had a button which could produce a double-click or right-click. (Touching the screen gave a single-click.)
- The position of the pen could be detected, and the correctly placed pointer could be displayed, even when the pen was up to 1 cm away from the screen. This could e.g. trigger tooltip text display in newer operating systems.

The Concerto was a unique design, in as much as it was "upside-down" - the main body including the motherboard, hard disk drive, floppy disk drive, and expansion slots were behind the screen. The detachable keyboard was used as the lid but could be completely removed, at which point the Concerto became what is known as a slate PC. The pen was connected to the Concerto through an RF link, and there was a compartment in the Concerto for the pen.
