= Surface Pro =

Line of 2-in-1 detachables developed by Microsoft

The Surface Pro is a line of 2-in-1 detachable devices marketed by Microsoft, as a sub-brand of their Surface devices.

== Models ==
Several models have been produced:

- Surface Pro (1st generation), released in 2013
- Surface Pro 2, released in 2013
- Surface Pro 3, released in 2014
- Surface Pro 4, released in 2015
- Surface Pro 5 (5th generation), released in 2017
- Surface Pro 6, released in 2018
- Surface Pro 7, released in 2019
  Surface Pro 7+, released in 2021
- Surface Pro X, (ARM) released in 2019
  Surface Pro X 2 (2nd), (ARM) released in 2020
- Surface Pro 8, released in 2021
- Surface Pro 9, (ARM or x86) released in 2022
- Surface Pro 10, (ARM or x86) released in 2024
- Surface Pro 11th Edition
  Surface Pro 11 (ARM), released in 2024
  Surface Pro 11 (x86), released in 2025
- Surface Pro 12" (1st generation), released in 2025
- Surface Pro 13" 12th Edition, released in June 2026
- Surface Pro 12" 12th Edition, released in September 2026

== Timeline ==
Timeline of Surface devices
Sources: Microsoft Devices Blog Microsoft Surface Store Microsoft Surface for Business store
