= Surface Laptop Go 3 =

Laptop by Microsoft

- Developer: Microsoft
- Product family: Microsoft Surface
- Type: Laptop
- Generation: Third
- Released: October 3, 2023; 2 years ago
- Availability: 2023
- Introductory price: Starting at $749 USD (Business) $799 (Consumer)
- Operating system: Windows 11
- CPU: Intel Core i5-1235U
- Memory: 8 to 16 GB RAM
- Storage: 128 to 512 GB
- Removable storage: none
- Display: 12.4 inch Touchscreen; PixelSense Display; 1536 x 1024, 148 ppi 3:2 Aspect Ratio
- Graphics: Intel Iris Xe Graphics
- Sound: Omnisonic Speakers with Dolby Audio Premium, 3.5 mm headphone jack, Dual far-field Studio Mics
- Input: Built in: touchscreen, ambient light sensor, keyboard, touchpad, fingerprint reader Sold Separately: mouse, stylus pen, adaptive kit
- Camera: 720p HD f2.0 camera
- Touchpad: Built-in
- Connectivity: WiFi 6, Bluetooth 5.1, USB C, USB A
- Online services: Microsoft Store, OneDrive
- Dimensions: 278.2 mm x 206.2 mm x 15.7 mm (10.95 in x 8.12 in x 0.62 in)
- Weight: 1,129 grams (2.489 lb)
- Predecessor: Surface Laptop Go 2
- Website: www.surface.com

The Surface Laptop Go 3 is the successor to the Surface Laptop Go 2. It is a mid-range portable computer that is part of the company's Surface line of personal computing devices. It was announced on September 21, 2023 with an expected release date of October 3.

== Configuration ==
Surface Laptop Go 3 Configuration Options
Price Tier in USD		CPU	GPU	RAM	Internal Storage	Color	Fingerprint
Consumer	Business	CPU	GPU	RAM	Internal Storage	Color	Fingerprint
	$749	Intel Core i5-1235U	Intel Iris Xe	8 GB	128 GB UFS	P	No
$799	$899	Intel Core i5-1235U	Intel Iris Xe	8 GB	256 GB NVMe SSD	P B S S (Note: Ice Blue, Sage, and Sandstone colors are selectable for consumer models only)	Yes
$999	$1099	Intel Core i5-1235U	Intel Iris Xe	16 GB	256 GB NVMe SSD	P	Yes
	$1249	Intel Core i5-1235U	Intel Iris Xe	16 GB	512 GB NVMe SSD	P	Yes

Sage Platinum Ice Blue Sandstone

== Features ==
- 12th Generation Intel® Core™ i5 1235U Processor
- Intel Iris Xe GPU.
- Preinstalled operating system: Windows 11 Home (Consumer), Windows 11 Pro (Business)
- 12.4-inch PixelSense 1536 x 1024 (148 ppi) display with a 3:2 aspect ratio
- Up to 15 hours of battery life
- Aluminum finish
- Full size keyboard with a full set of function keys
- Fingerprint Power Button with One Touch sign-in through Windows Hello (Standard on consumer models.)
- Discrete hardware TPM 2.0 (Business Models only)

== Hardware ==
The Surface Laptop Go 3 is a minor update to the Surface Laptop Go 2. Unlike the latter model, the Go 3 will be made with an aluminum top and an aluminum polycarbonate composite resin system with glass fiber and 30% postconsumer recycled content base. Microsoft claims the device will have an improved battery life of up to 15 hours, thanks to the more efficient CPU.

It carries over the 12.4-inch "PixelSense" Display at 1536 × 1024 from the prior two generations with a 3:2 aspect ratio.

The Surface Laptop Go 3 uses a twelfth-generation Intel Core i5 processor with Intel Iris Xe Graphics. The base model of the device will now have 8 GB RAM (up from four.) For the first time, both consumer models will now have 256 GB of storage, with business models topping off at 512 GB.

Like prior generations, the device will have 1 USB-C and 1 USB-A port, alongside a headphone jack and a Surface Connect port for charging. The laptop also has Wi-Fi 6 and Bluetooth 5.

Consumer models of the device now has a fingerprint power button with Windows Hello and TPM 2.0 as standard.

== Software ==
Consumer models ship with a pre-installed 64-bit version of Windows 11 Home, a 30-day trial of Microsoft Office 365, and a 30-day trial of Xbox Game Pass Ultimate. Commercial models ship with Windows 11 Pro, and a 30-day trial of either Microsoft 365 Business or Apps.

== Timeline ==
Timeline of Surface devices
Sources: Microsoft Devices Blog Microsoft Surface Store Microsoft Surface for Business store

Preceded by Surface Laptop Go 2	Surface Laptop Go 3; 3rd generation	Succeeded by TBA
