= Surface Pro 2 =

Tablet-hybrid computer device

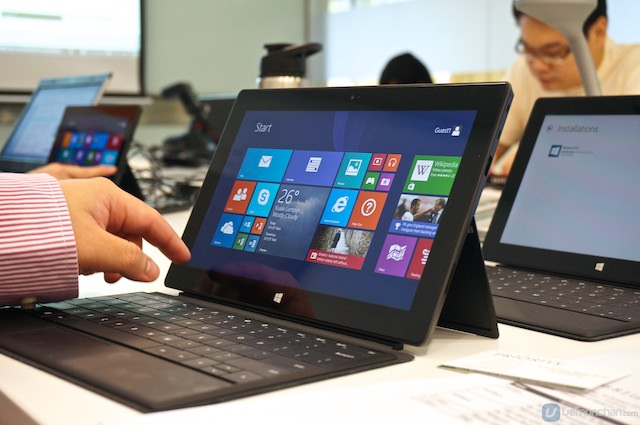
- Surface Pro 2 with Type Cover
- Developer: Microsoft
- Product family: Surface
- Type: 2-in-1 detachable
- Released: October 22, 2013
- Discontinued: July 5, 2014
- Operating system: Windows 8.1 Pro (upgradable to Windows 10)
- CPU: Intel low-voltage dual-core: i5-4300U; 1.9 up to 2.9 GHz, 3 MB cache, 15 W i5-4200U (Prior to Dec. 2013); 1.6 up to 2.6 GHz, 3 MB cache, 15 W.
- Memory: 4/8 GB dual-channel DDR3-1600 (25.6 GB/sec)
- Storage: 64 GB (37 GB available), 128 GB (97 GB available), 256 GB (212 GB available), 512 GB (451 GB available) and microSDXC card reader
- Display: 10.6 inches (27 cm) 1920 x 1080 px (208 ppi) ClearType HD screen with 16:9 aspect ratio
- Graphics: Intel HD Graphics 4400
- Sound: Dolby Digital Plus stereo speakers
- Input: 10-point multi-touch screen, Wacom digital pen digitizer, ambient light sensor, 3-axis accelerometer, 3-axis gyroscope, compass, dual microphones
- Camera: Front: 1.2 MP, 720p HD; Rear: 1.2 MP, 720p HD
- Connectivity: 2×2 MIMO Wi-Fi (802.11 a/b/g/n), Bluetooth 4.0, USB 3.0, Mini DisplayPort 1.2
- Power: 151.2 kJ (42 W·h) battery
- Online services: Windows Store, OneDrive, Xbox Music, Xbox Games, Xbox Video
- Dimensions: 10.81 inches (27.5 cm) (w); 6.81 inches (17.3 cm) (h); 0.5315 inches (13.50 mm) (d)
- Weight: 1.984 pounds (900 g)
- Predecessor: Surface Pro
- Successor: Surface Pro 3

The Surface Pro 2 is a Surface-series 2-in-1 detachable produced by Microsoft. Unveiled at an event in New York City on September 23, 2013, and released on October 22, 2013, it succeeds the Surface Pro released in February 2013. While maintaining a design similar to the original design of its predecessor, the Surface Pro 2 has improved hardware specifications compared to it, such as a Haswell Intel Core processor and an increased number of storage options, improved versions of the kickstand and cover accessories.

== History ==
Pre-orders for the Surface Pro 2 were opened on September 24, 2013, and the device was released on October 22, 2013. The Surface Pro 2 launched with the Surface 2, the Touch Cover 2, and the Type Cover 2. Panos Panay, head of Surface at Microsoft was the sole speaker for the event and the advocate for the entire Surface Team and the Surface Remix Project.

On May 20, 2014, its successor, the Microsoft Surface Pro 3, was announced. It is bigger than its predecessor, with a 12-inch display, but at the same time is both thinner and lighter and comes with an improved, multi-stage kickstand which is held up by friction.

== Features ==
=== Hardware ===
The Surface Pro 2 shares most of its design with its predecessor, the Surface Pro. The device's exterior is constructed from black magnesium alloy. The Surface Pro 2 weighs 915 grams (2.01 lb): the same as its predecessor. The Surface Pro 2 features a 10.6 inches (27 cm) display. The screen has a 16:9 aspect ratio, which is advantageous for video playback. Unlike its predecessor, the Surface Pro 2 has a two-stage kickstand that can be set to two different angles: 22 and 55 degrees. The new 55 degrees angle was added to make the device more comfortable on the lap. As with the previous Surface Pro, it includes 10.6-inch 10-point 1080p multi-touch digitizer LCD with a Wacom stylus pen that supports 1024 different levels of pressure.

Surface Pro 2 was shipped with the fourth generation Haswell Intel Core i5-4200U (1.6 GHz with Intel Turbo Boost up to 2.6 GHz). In December 2013, Microsoft updated the CPU to a 1.9 GHz dual Core i5-4300U. The Surface Pro 2 was available with 64, 128, 256, or 512 GB of internal storage; the 64 and 128 GB models includes 4 GB of RAM, while the latter options include 8 GB. The CPU includes the TPM, or trusted platform module, version 1.2.

Like the Surface Pro, the Surface Pro 2 has a gyroscope, accelerometer, ambient light sensor, compass, 2 720p Lifecam cameras, and stereo speakers.

=== Software ===
The Surface Pro 2 ships with Windows 8.1 Pro as its operating system. Microsoft shipped the Surface Pro 2 with a one-month trial version of Office 2013. Since July 29, the Surface Pro 2 has been further upgradeable to Windows 10, which will be free for existing users.

The Surface Pro comes with pre-installed apps that include: Fresh Paint, Xbox Video, Xbox Music, Internet Explorer, Photos, Mail, Maps, People, Skype, Calendar, Games, and OneNote. A suite of MSN apps (formerly Bing apps) that are included are: MSN Food and Drink, MSN Money (formerly Bing Finance), the Bing app (now defunct), MSN Weather, MSN Travel, and MSN Sports.

Reader and Sound Recorder were added with the Windows 8.1 update, as well as an updated version of Fresh Paint.

With Windows 10, Xbox Music app and service will be rebranded to Groove and the Groove music app.

=== Accessories ===
Updated versions of the Surface's cover accessories are available for the Surface Pro 2; the Touch Cover 2 and Type Cover 2 are slightly thinner than the previous versions and now include a "dynamic" backlight system. The Touch Cover 2 has over 1,092 sensors on it compared to just 80 on the original Touch Cover. The keyswitch length of the Type Cover 2 have been reduced from 2.5mm to 1.5mm. A Power Cover accessory is also available to add 30 Wh additional battery capacity to the device. Accompanying the Touch Cover 2 and Type Cover 2 is a wireless adapter that allows them to be connected up to 30 feet away via Bluetooth. During its unveiling, Microsoft also showcased the Music Cover; a variation of the Touch Cover that serves as a DJ mixer with playback controls, a 16-button sampler, and three sliders. While mainstream public release has been announced, it will be distributed to musicians through the Surface Remix Project campaign. Microsoft also introduced a new accessory called the Docking Station. The Docking Station works exclusively with the Surface Pro and Surface Pro 2, and not with the Surface RT or Surface 2. This desktop style peripheral attaches to the back of the Surface, adding three USB 2.0 ports, one USB 3.0 port, one 10/100 Ethernet port, one mini DisplayPort and 3.5 mm audio input/output ports. It supports a resolution of 3840 x 2160 (commonly known as 4K or Ultra HD).

== Reception ==
Tony Bradley from PC World wrote: "A funny thing happened to me when I started playing around with a Surface Pro 2: It became my favorite computer. I'm not a Windows hater by any stretch of the imagination, but I also didn't expect to come to rely on the Surface Pro 2 as much as I did. Normally I use an 11-inch MacBook Air as my primary PC, and I have an iPad mini and a Samsung Series 7 Slate as secondary devices."

Ewan Spence from Forbes wrote: "The Surface Pro 2 takes all the compromises that are present in any hardware design (power, portability, input, connectivity, etc) and makes them work together, and in the process addresses the biggest compromise of all... mixing a laptop and a tablet."

Tom Warren from The Verge wrote: "The Surface Pro 2's unique mix of touch, keyboard, mouse, and pen really does work. It does everything you would expect a regular desktop PC to do."

Brooke Crothers from CNET wrote: "With Surface Pro 2, Microsoft has made a tablet-hybrid that works. It's powerful, portable, and well-made."

Joel Santo Domingo from PC Magazine wrote: "The Microsoft Surface Pro 2 is a worthy follow up to our former Editors' Choice, the Microsoft Surface Windows 8 Pro. It improves performance and battery life, while keeping the form factor and wide accessory catalog the first-gen Surface Pro had going for it."

Charles McLellan from ZDNet wrote: "The Haswell-based Surface Pro 2 delivers improved performance and battery life, and its dual-angle kickstand is also welcome. However, the Pro 2's unchanged chassis design feels bulkier and heavier than ever, and it becomes very expensive when fully accessorised."

Matt Safford from Digital Trends wrote: "The Surface Pro 2 is much improved over the original, but it's still too heavy for a tablet and is no steal at a price starting around $900."

Peter Bright from Ars Technica wrote: "If you're wanting a laptop, get a laptop—and if you just want a tablet, pick up the Surface 2 for half the price."

It has been rated 1 out of 10 for repairability by iFixit.

== Timeline ==
Timeline of Surface devices
Sources: Microsoft Devices Blog Microsoft Surface Store Microsoft Surface for Business store

Preceded by Surface Pro	Surface Pro; 2nd generation	Succeeded by Surface Pro 3
