= Joel Dehlin =

American entrepreneur

- Education: Brigham Young University
- Occupation: Entrepreneur

Joel Dehlin is an entrepreneur and the CEO and founder of the Kuali company.

== Biography ==
He has held chief technology officer positions at Instructure, O.C. Tanner Co., a human resource consulting services company and at iQor, a business process outsourcing (BPO) company. He was the chief information officer for the Church of Jesus Christ of Latter-day Saints (LDS Church). Prior to working for the LDS Church, he worked at Microsoft for 10 years in various roles, at Arthur Andersen, and at Novell. While at Microsoft, Dehlin worked on the original microsoft.com product, in the mobile devices division, and as the executive producer and co-designer of Microsoft Allegiance. He was also one of the co-creators of Microsoft PixelSense. He has 21 patents.

Dehlin co-authored the book Object Programming with Visual Basic 4 and Microsoft Office for Windows 95.

Dehlin was chairman of the board for Rhomobile, until the company sold to Motorola Solutions in 2011.

Dehlin was also listed as one of the 2019 CEO of the Year Honorees by Utah Business.
