= TouchLight =

Touch screen and 3D display

TouchLight is an imaging touch screen and 3D display for gesture-based interaction. It was developed by Microsoft Research employee Andrew D. Wilson and made known to the public in late 2005. The technology was licensed to Eon Reality in July 2006.

== Abilities ==
The TouchLight can both record and project simultaneously, and due to its 3D capabilities can be used almost as a mirror. This same principle could be applied to link two TouchLights together allowing two people anywhere in the world to communicate with each other as if they were sitting on opposite sides of the same desk. It can capture a high definition image of anything placed up against the screen. This image is then displayed in 2D. The user of the TouchLight can manipulate the size, position and orientation of the image by performing the corresponding action with their hands. The screen has a microphone built in that can detect vibration, thus allowing the user to change setting simply by tapping the screen.

== Cost ==
In 2006, the high end product cost upwards of $60,000.

== See also ==
- Microsoft PixelSense
