= Surface Duo 2 =

Folding device model from Microsoft

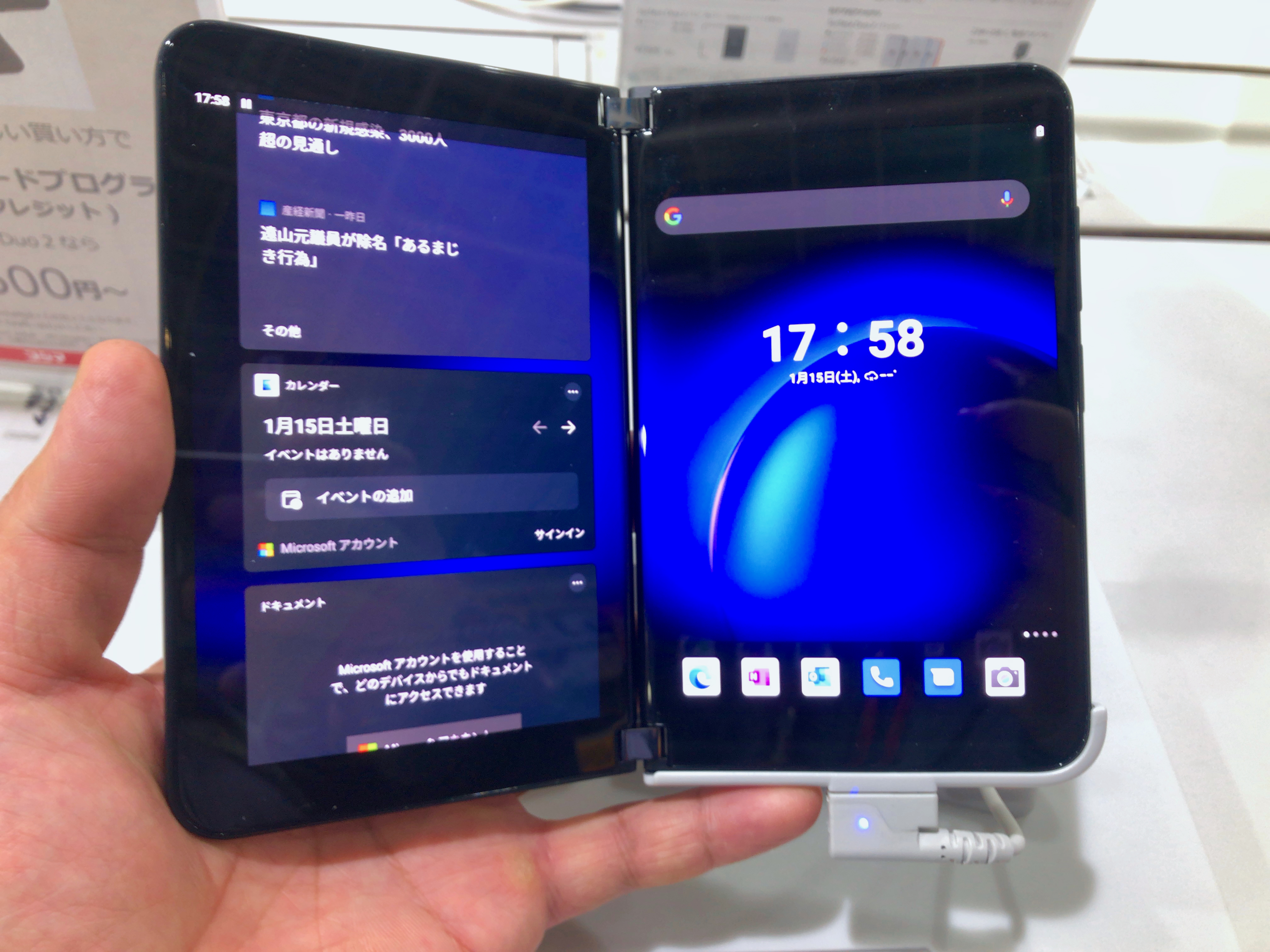
- Surface Duo 2 on display in Japan
- Brand: Microsoft Surface
- Manufacturer: Microsoft
- Type: Smartphone
- Series: Surface Duo
- First released: 22 September 2021; 5 years ago
- Availability by region: 21 October 2021; 4 years ago
- Discontinued: October 21, 2024
- Predecessor: Surface Duo
- Compatible networks: 2G, 3G, 4G, 5G
- Form factor: Folio, phablet
- Colors: Glacier, Obsidian
- Dimensions: Open : 145.2 mm × 184.5 mm × 5.50 mm (5.717 in × 7.264 in × 0.217 in); Close : 145.2 mm × 92.1 mm × 11.0 mm (5.72 in × 3.63 in × 0.43 in)
- Weight: 284 g (10 oz) (0.626 lb)
- Operating system: Original: Android 11; Current: Android 12L
- System-on-chip: Qualcomm Snapdragon 888 5G
- CPU: Octa-core; 1 x 2.84 GHz Kryo 680; 3 x 2.42 GHz Kryo 680; 4 x 1.80 GHz Kryo 680
- GPU: Adreno 660
- Memory: 8GB DRAM LPDDR5
- Storage: 128GB, 256GB, 512GB
- Removable storage: none
- SIM: nanoSIM, eSIM
- Battery: 4449 mAh
- Charging: 23W USB-C power supply with fast charging
- Rear camera: Wide: 12MP, f/1.7, 27 mm, 1.4μm Telephoto: 12MP, f/2.4, 51 mm, 1.0μm, 2X optical zoom Ultra-Wide: 16MP, f/2.2, 13 mm, 1.0μm, 110°
- Front camera: 12MP, f/2.0, 24 mm, 1.0μm
- Display: 2x 5.8 in (150 mm) AMOLED 1344x1892 (401 ppi) with Gorilla Glass Victus
- Sound: Stereo speaker, dual mic AI-based, Qualcomm aptX Classic, HD and TWS
- Connectivity: Wi-Fi 6, Bluetooth 5.1, USB-C 3.2 G2, NFC, GPS, Galileo, GLONASS, BeiDou, QZSS,
- Data inputs: Surface Pen; Sensors : dual accelerometer, dual gyroscope, dual magnetometer, dual ambient light sensor, dual proximity Sensor, hall sensor, fingerprint reader
- Website: www.surface.com

The Surface Duo 2 is a discontinued dual-touchscreen Android smartphone manufactured by Microsoft that is part of the Surface product family. Announced during a hardware-oriented event on September 22, 2021, it is the successor to the original Surface Duo.

== Specifications ==
=== Hardware ===
The Surface Duo 2 uses a similar folio form factor to the first-generation model, although it is slightly thicker to accommodate a larger battery, and now offered in a new black color option. It features a pair of 5.8-inch OLED displays with a 90 Hz refresh rate, with their innermost edges being curved over the side. This is used as part of a new feature known as the "Glance Bar", which allows notifications and other content to be displayed along its spine. As with the Surface Duo, it supports Surface Pen styluses, including the concurrently-unveiled Surface Slim Pen 2.

The device uses the Qualcomm Snapdragon 888 5G system-on-chip, adding 5G and near-field communication (NFC) support that was not present on the original Surface Duo. It also has an increased 8 GB of RAM compared to the 6 GB of its predecessor, dual speakers, and a fingerprint reader in its power button. The Surface Duo 2 has both front and rear-facing cameras, with the rear camera array featuring a 12-megapixel lens, 16-megapixel wide-angle lens, and a 12-megapixel telephoto lens.

=== Software ===
The Surface Duo 2 launched with Android 11. An update to Android 12 L was released in October 2022, adding Windows 11-inspired design elements and other new features.

== Reception ==
The Surface Duo 2 received a mixed reception. The Verge praised the Duo 2 for having more competitive hardware than the first-generation model, including a faster processor, more RAM, and 5G support (although still lacking features such as wireless charging), and its software for being "undeniably better than it was on the original at launch". However, the reviewer noted issues with touch input response, web browsers such as Microsoft Edge and Google Chrome did not support displaying multiple pages on the two screens, and felt that its cameras were exceeded in quality by even cheaper devices such as the Pixel 5a. In conclusion, it was felt that "between the bugs and inherent awkwardness of the form factor, the Duo 2 is just a difficult device to live with day to day, much like its predecessor." As of October 21, 2024, the Surface Duo 2 was discontinued by Microsoft, and the last security update was released on October 8, 2024.

== Timeline ==
Timeline of Surface devices
Sources: Microsoft Devices Blog Microsoft Surface Store Microsoft Surface for Business store
