= 2-in-1 laptop =

Mobile device combining laptop and tablet characteristics

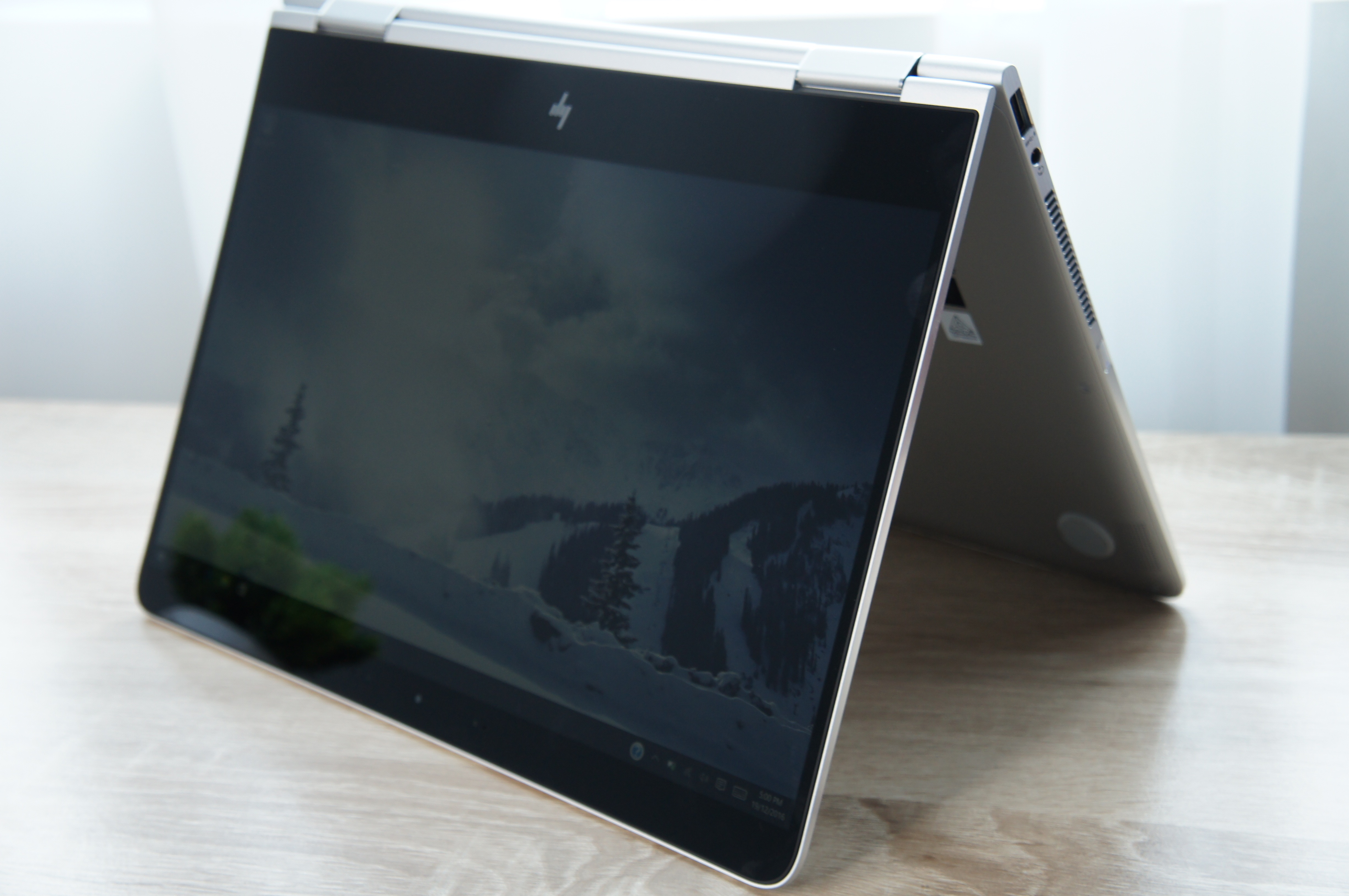
HP Spectre x360 convertible laptop

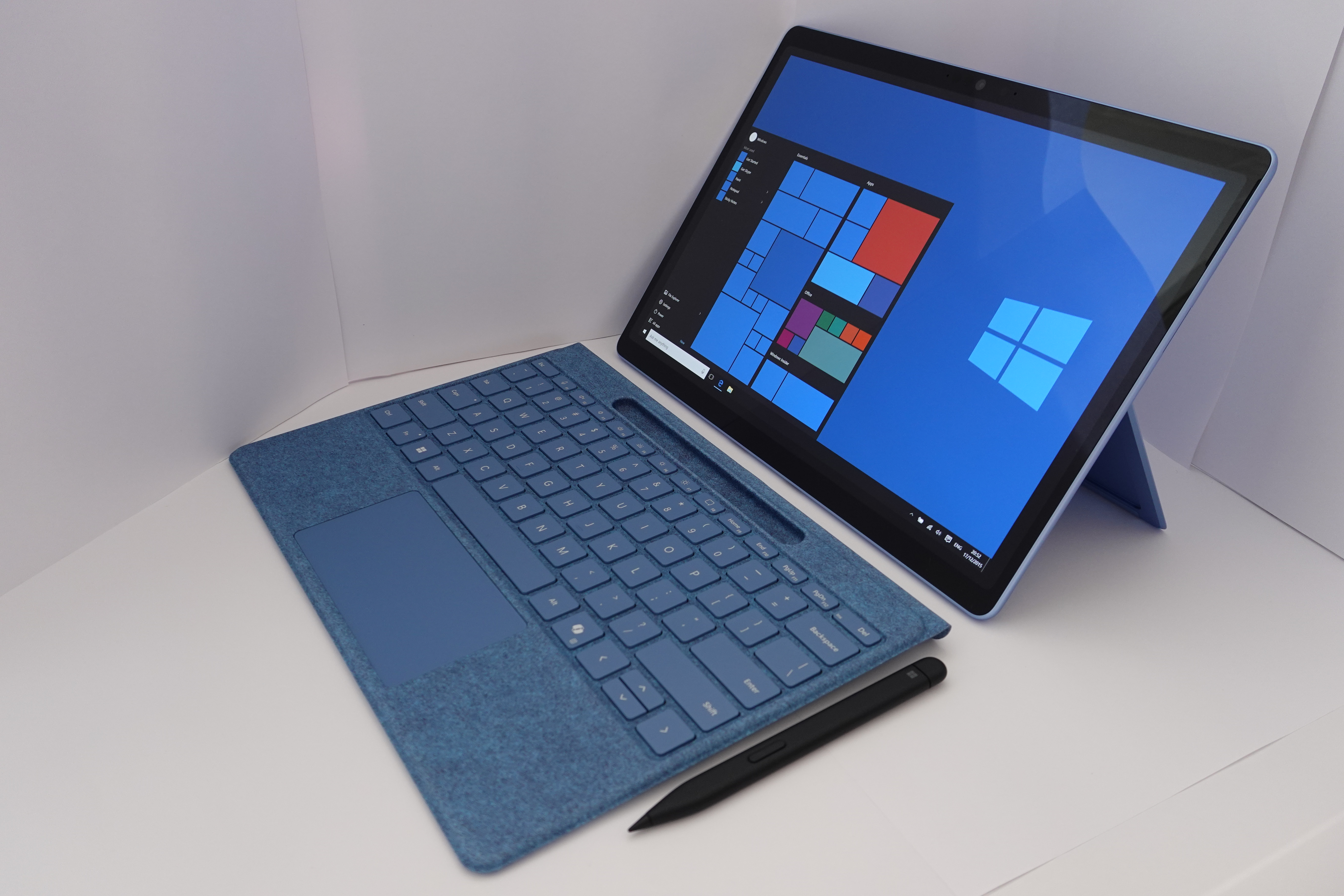
Microsoft Surface Pro, a kickstand hinge laptop with detachable keyboard

A 2-in-1 laptop, also known as a convertible laptop, 2-in-1 PC, 2-in-1 tablet, laplet, tabtop, laptop tablet, or simply 2-in-1, is a portable computer that has features of both tablets and laptops.

2-in-1 PCs consist of portable computer components within light and thin chassis, and exemplify technological convergence. They are convenient for media consumption and non-intensive tasks in tablet mode yet useful for content creation in laptop mode.

== Terminology ==
Before the emergence of 2-in-1s and their denomination as such, technology journalists used the words convertible and hybrid to denominate pre-2-in-1 portable computers: Convertible typically denominated those that featured a mechanism to conceal the physical keyboard by sliding or rotating it behind the chassis, and hybrid those that featured a hot-pluggable, complementary, physical keyboard. Both pre-2-in-1 convertibles and hybrids were crossover devices that combined features of both tablets and laptops. The later 2-in-1 PCs comprise a category that is a sibling to both the pre-2-in-1 convertibles and hybrids. Models of 2-in-1 PC are each similarly categorized as either a 2-in-1 convertible or 2-in-1 detachable, respectively, and despite borrowing the terminology of the pre-2-in-1 PCs, the two species of 2-in-1 PCs are distinct from the two species of pre-2-in-1 PCs because 2-in-1 PCs have additional features of traditional laptops.

== Forms ==
=== 2-in-1 convertible ===
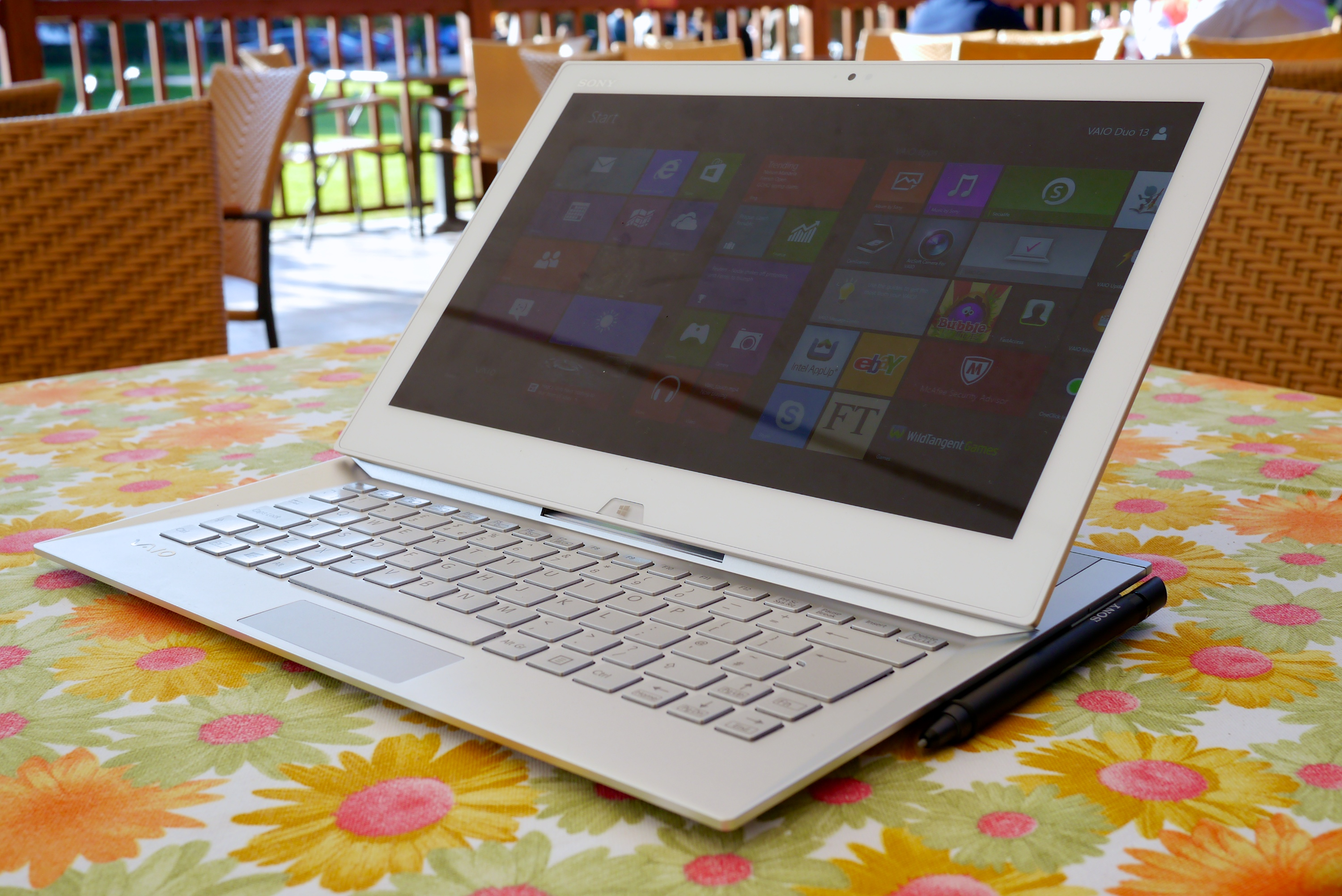
Sony VAIO Duo, a 2-in-1 convertible with a sliding keyboard

2-in-1 convertibles are tablets with in which the keyboard can be rotated, folded, or slid behind the display. On most devices, the hinge is at the junction of the display and the keyboard. In the Dell XPS Duo, uniquely, the display sits in a spinning frame.

==== Netvertible ====
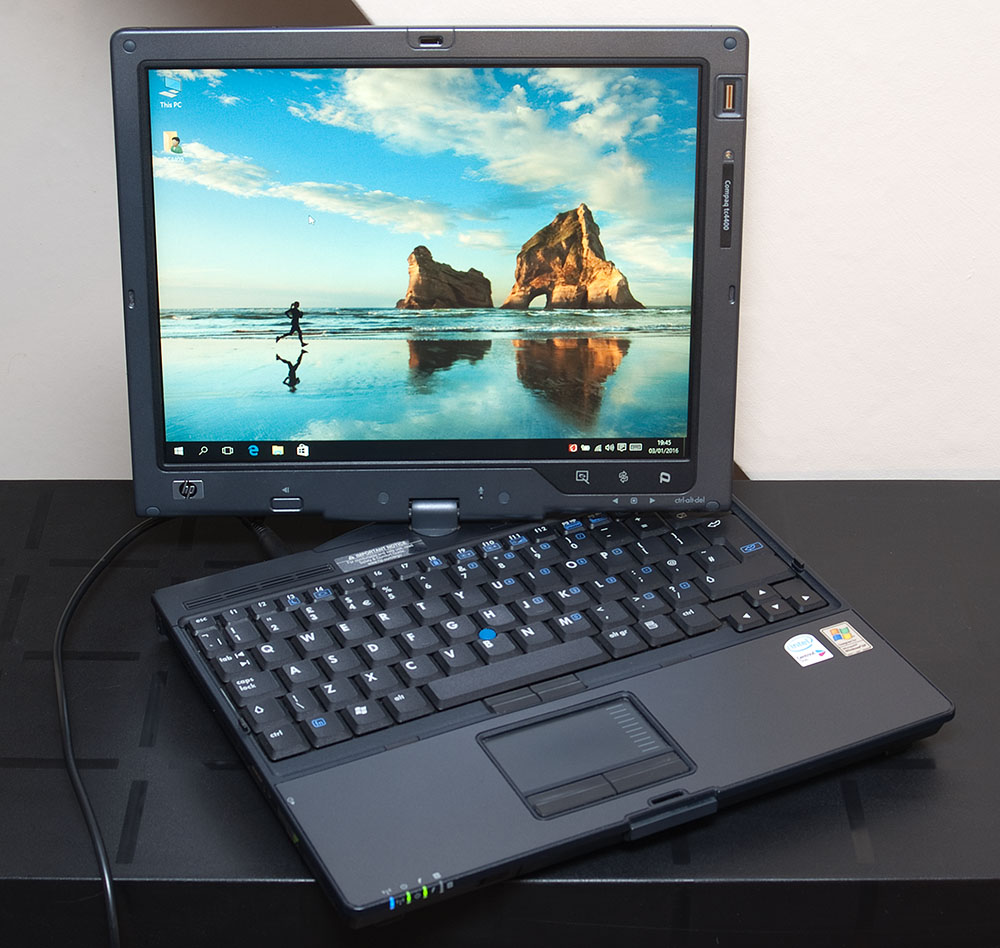
HP Compaq as netvertible example

Rotational-convertible format is where in addition to the conventional hinging action, the central single hinge mechanism is also able to rotate about a central axis perpendicular to the keyboard surface, such that the laptop can be turned into a thick tablet. Most netvertibles have the option to support active (electromagnetic) stylus and/or touchscreen (resistive or capacitive), some being ruggedized such as Panasonic Toughbook CF series. Other examples include Toshiba Portege M7xx, Fujitsu LifeBook T series and HP EliteBook Revolve series.

=== 2-in-1 detachable ===
2-in-1 detachable are devices with detachable keyboards. In most cases, the keyboard part provides few, if any, additional features (most often a touchpad, as in the HP Spectre x2). However, the keyboards of some detachable provide additional features similar to those of a docking station such as additional I/O-ports and supplementary batteries. For instance, the Surface Book can leverage the discrete GPU in the keyboard upon the keyboard's connection.

When connected to the keyboard, the display of the detachable can either be free-standing on the hinge or require external support, often in the form of a kickstand. Novel ways of providing external support include the bending frame and locking mechanism of the HP Spectre x2.

Though the keyboard is usually bundled with the purchase of a 2-in-1 detachable, it is occasionally deemed an optional accessory by manufacturers in order to minimize the starting price of a device. In such cases the 2-in-1 detachable is often displayed with its complementary keyboard in advertisements and promotional materials. This is true for all devices of the Surface and Surface Pro lines.

==== Bluetooth/Detachable keyboard accessories ====
Although not in typical laptop sizes, but due to Smartphone/Phablet and Tablet hardware getting more powerful, some third party OEMs have developed keyboard accessories which would be attached to the handheld device either through a wireless connection or via the USB port which allowed it to work like a laptop.

== Distinction from traditional tablets and laptops ==
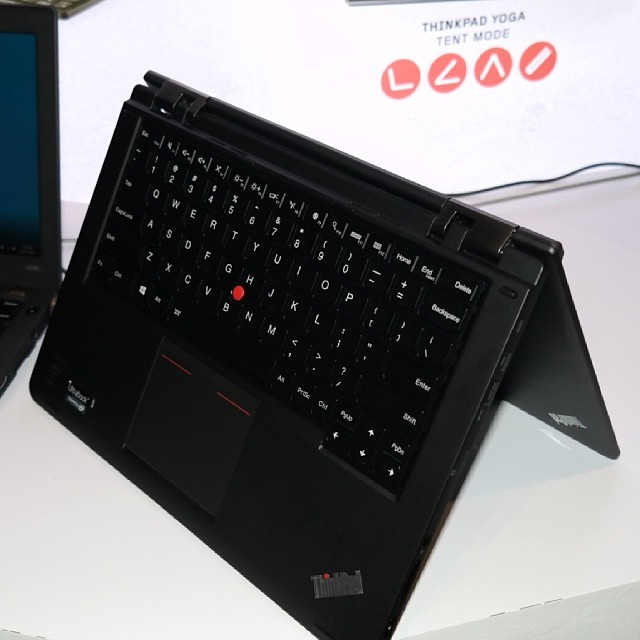
ThinkPad Yoga with 360° rotating hinge

2-in-1s fall in the category of hybrid or convertible tablets but are distinct in that they run a full-featured desktop operating system and have I/O ports typically found on laptops, such as USB and DisplayPort. The most prominent element is the keyboard that allows the 2-in-1 to provide the ergonomic typing experience of a laptop.

While 2-in-1s fall in a category distinct from laptops, they loosely parallel the traits of the Ultrabook device category, having light and thin chassis, power-efficient CPUs, and long battery lives. They are distinguished from traditional Ultrabooks by the inclusion of a touchscreen display and a concealable or detachable keyboard.

== Examples ==
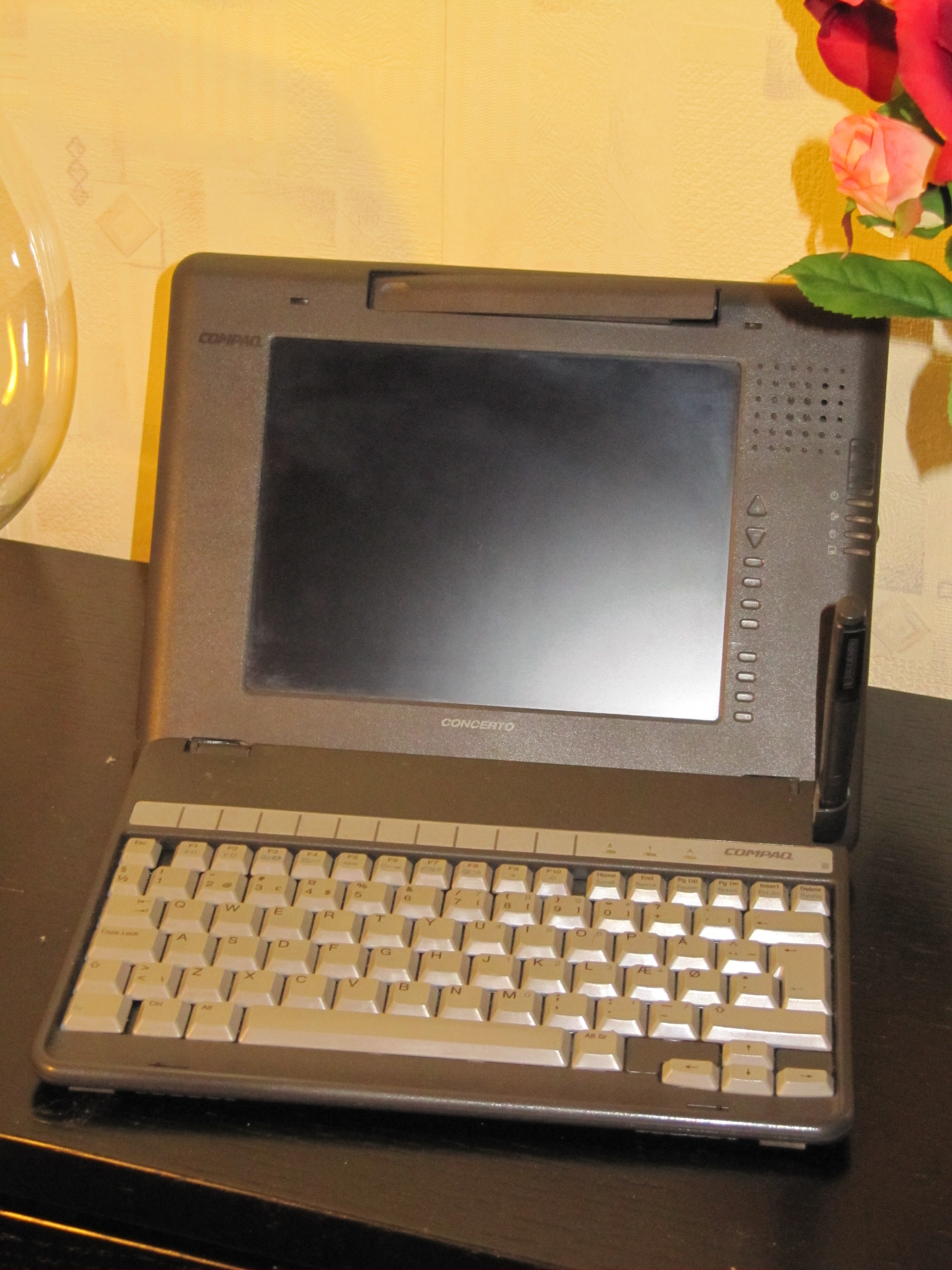
The Compaq Concerto, one of the earliest 2-in-1 PCs

The earliest device that can be considered a 2-in-1 detachable is the Compaq Concerto from 1993. It came with Windows 3.1 and Windows for Pen Computing, and had a cabled detachable keyboard, and battery powered stylus. In June 1994, IBM introduced the ThinkPad 360P, which features a display that can be rotated backwards and closed down into a pen-operated tablet.

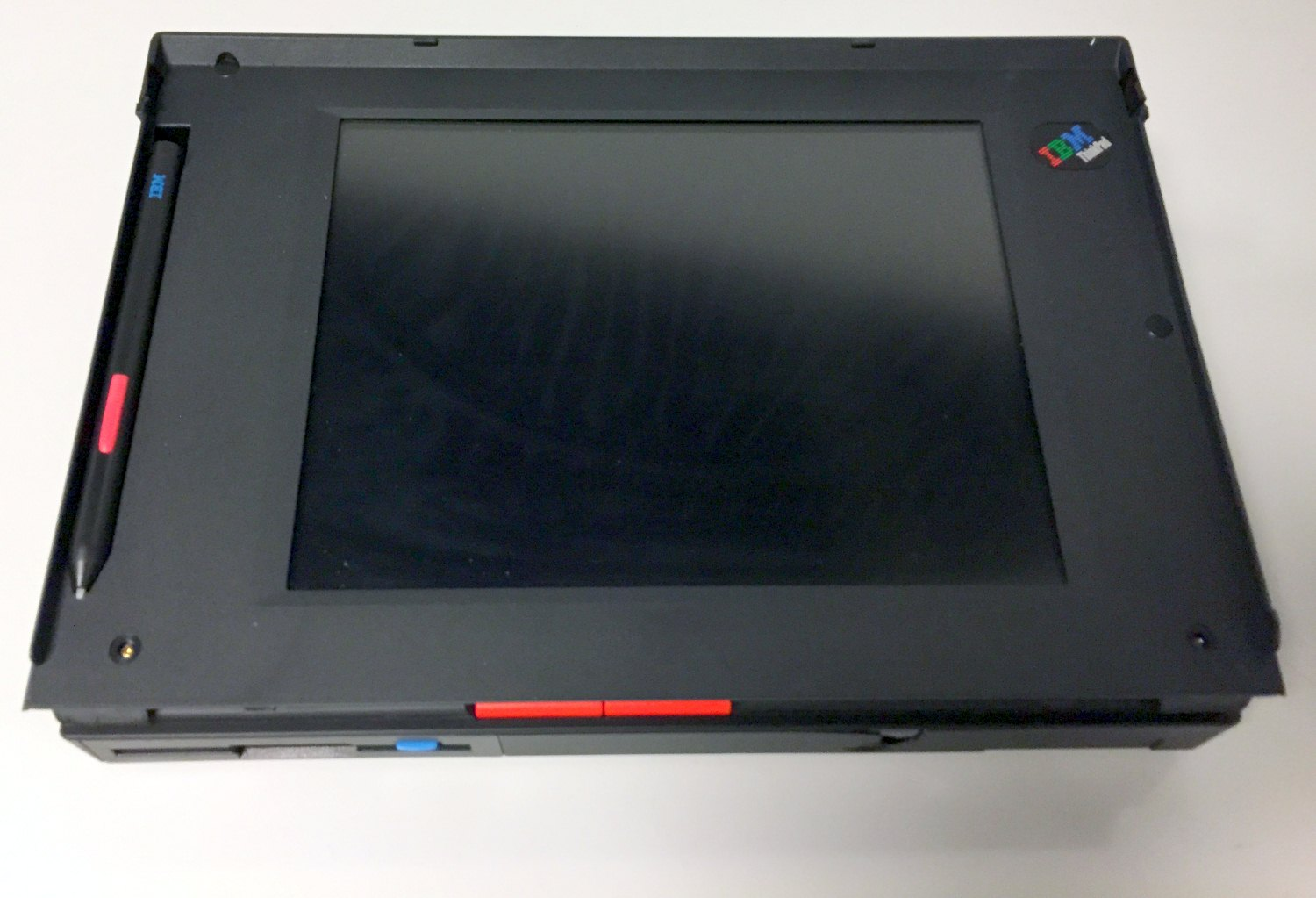
The IBM ThinkPad 360P, an early 2-in-1, is shown here in tablet mode.

Mainstream attention for 2-in-1 PCs was not achieved until nearly two decades later, when many manufactures showed devices, at that time referred to as "hybrid" devices, at CES 2011. While Packard Bell, Acer and HP all had Microsoft Windows based 2-in-1s by 2011, Lenovo released the well reviewed Windows 2-in-1: The X220 Tablet variant of the ThinkPad X220, successor of 2010's ThinkPad X201 Tablet. The 12-inch device included a digital stylus housed within the chassis, somewhat ruggedized construction, and a multi-touch screen with a twist and fold hinge.

Microsoft started its own line of 2-in-1s with the introduction of the Surface Pro series, the first of which was released in February 2013. It had a 10.6-inch (27 cm) display, Intel Core i5 CPU, and included the Pro Pen stylus and a detachable keyboard that doubled as a protective screen cover. In 2015 Microsoft introduced the Surface Book series, which, similar to the Surface Pro series, features a detachable keyboard cover and Surface Pen stylus.

Samsung entered the 2-in-1 PC market with the release of the Windows-based Samsung Galaxy TabPro S, which was released in March 2016. It had a 12-inch display, Intel Core m3 CPU, a first-party keyboard attachment, and a TabPro Pen. Its successor, the Galaxy Book, was released in February 2017. Coming in a 10.6-inch model and a 12-inch model, the Galaxy Book has an improved detachable keyboard and include an S Pen.

Google entered the 2-in-1 market after it announced the Pixel Slate in October 2018. It runs on ChromeOS and features a 12.3-inch display. It includes two USB-C ports, but it omits the 3.5mm headphone jack. The featured Pixel Keyboard and Pixelbook Pen are sold separately.

Since 2012, a number of other prominent laptop manufacturers, such as Dell, Asus, and Sony have also begun releasing their own 2-in-1s.

While the iPad Pro has optional Smart Keyboard and Apple Pencil accessories, Apple has yet to release a true 2-in-1 PC in a detachable form-factor and with a similar desktop OS, citing the quote below.

== Criticism ==
In April 2012 Apple's CEO Tim Cook, answering to the question of the researcher Anthony Sacconaghi about a possible hybrid of iPad and MacBook, compared a 2-in-1 to a combination of "a toaster and a refrigerator" that "doesn't please anyone":

I think, Tony, anything can be forced to converge. But the problem is that products are about trade-offs, and you begin to make trade-offs to the point where what you have left at the end of the day doesn't please anyone. You can converge a toaster and a refrigerator, but those things are probably not going to be pleasing to the user … you wouldn't want to put these things together because you wind up compromising in both and not pleasing either user. Some people will prefer to own both, and that's great, too. But I think to make the compromises of convergence, so — we're not going to that party. Others might. Others might from a defensive point of view, particularly. But we're going to play in both.

— Tim Cook, Apple's CEO

2-in-1s are natively supported by the Microsoft Windows, and Google ChromeOS operating systems. Various other Linux distributions also support some touch features of 2-in-1s, though they are generally unsupported by hardware vendors.

== See also ==
- All-in-one computer
- Foldable smartphone
- Tablet
