= List of dual-touchscreen devices =

The following is a list of dual-touchscreen devices. Note this list does not include unreleased devices.

Brand	Name	Release date (yyyy-mm-dd)	Display	Operating System	Type	Notes
Acer	Iconia 6120	2011-01	(2) 14 in 1366x768 LCD	Windows 7	Laptop	Touchscreens do not function properly in versions of Windows after Windows 8.1.
enTourage	eDGe	2011-11	(1) 10.1 in 1024x600 TFT (1) 9.7 in 1200x825 E-ink	Android 2.2	Tablet	
Honor	Magic V	2022-01-10	(Internal) 7.9 in 2272x1984 AMOLED (External) 6.45 in 2560x1080 AMOLED	Android 12	Foldable phablet	
Honor	Magic Vs	2022-11-23	(Internal) 7.9 in 2272x1984 AMOLED (External) 6.45 in 2560x1080 AMOLED	Android 13	Foldable phablet	
Honor	Magic V2	2023-07-12	(Internal) 7.92 in 2344x2156 AMOLED (External) 6.43 in 2376x1060 AMOLED	Android 13	Foldable phablet	
Huawei	Mate X2	2021-02-25	(Internal) 8 in 2480x2200 AMOLED (External) 6.45 in 2700x1160 AMOLED	Android 10	Foldable phablet	
Huawei	Mate X3	2023-04-08	(Internal) 7.85 in 2496x2224 AMOLED (External) 6.4 in 2504x1080 AMOLED	Android 12	Foldable phablet	
itel	A300+	2026-09-28	(Main) 6.78 HD+ in 720x1576 LCD (Secondary) 2.01 in 240x296 LCD	Android 16	Smartphone	
Kyocera Communications	Echo	2011-04-17	(2) 3.5 in 800x480 TFT	Android 2.2.1 Original Android 2.3.3 Latest	Smartphone	
Lenovo	Yoga Book C930	2018	(1) 10.8 in 2560x1600 IPS (1) 10.8 in 1920x1080 E-ink	Windows 10	Laptop	
Lenovo	Yoga Book 9i	2023	(1) 13.3 in 2880x1800 OLED (1) 13.3 in 2880x1800 OLED	Windows 11	Laptop	
LG	Wing	2020-10-15	(Main) 6.8 in 2460x1080 P-OLED (Secondary) 3.9 in 1240x1080	Android 10 Original		
Microsoft	Surface Duo	2020-09-10	(2) 5.6 in 1800x1350 AMOLED	Android 10 Original Android 12L Latest	Smartphone	
Microsoft	Surface Duo 2	2021-09-22	(2) 5.8 in 1892x1344 AMOLED	Android 11 Original Android 12L Latest	Smartphone	
NEC	Medias W N-05E	2013-04	(2) 4.3 in 960x540 TFT	Android 4.1	Smartphone	
Oppo	Find N	2021-12-17	(Internal) 7.1 in 1920x1792 AMOLED (External) 5.49 in 1972x988 AMOLED	Android 11 Original Android 13 Latest	Foldable phablet	
Oppo	Find N2	2022-12-23	(Internal) 7.1 in 1920x1792 AMOLED (External) 5.54 in 2122x1080 AMOLED	Android 13	Foldable phablet	
Samsung	Galaxy Z Fold	2019-09-06	(Internal) 7.3 in 2152x1536 AMOLED (External) 4.6 in 1680x720 AMOLED	Android 9 Original Android 12L Latest	Foldable phablet	
Samsung	Galaxy Z Fold 2	2020-09-18	(Internal) 7.6 in 2208x1768 AMOLED (External) 6.2 in 2260x816 AMOLED	Android 10 Original Android 13 Latest	Foldable phablet	
Samsung	Galaxy Z Fold 3	2021-08-27	(Internal) 7.6 in 2208x1768 AMOLED (External) 6.23 in 2268x832 AMOLED	Android 11 Original Android 13 Latest	Foldable phablet	
Samsung	Galaxy Z Fold 4	2022-08-25	(Internal) 7.6 in 2176x1812 AMOLED (External) 6.2 in 2376x904 AMOLED	Android 12L Original Android 13 Latest	Foldable phablet	
Samsung	Galaxy Z Fold 5	2023-08-11	(Internal) 7.6 in 2176x1812 AMOLED (External) 6.2 in 2316x904 AMOLED	Android 13 Original	Foldable phablet	
Sony	Tablet P	2011-12	(2) 5.5 in 1024x480 LCD	Android 3.2 Original Android 4.0.4 Latest	Tablet	
Toshiba	Libretto W100	2010-07	(2) 7 in 1024x600 LCD	Windows 7	Laptop	
Vivo	X Fold	2022-04-11	(Internal) 8.03 in 2160x1916 AMOLED (External) 6.53 in 2520x1080 AMOLED	Android 12	Foldable phablet	
Vivo	X Fold+	2022-09-26	(Internal) 8.03 in 2160x1916 AMOLED (External) 6.53 in 2520x1080 AMOLED	Android 12	Foldable phablet	
Xiaomi	Mi Mix Fold	2021-03	(Internal) 8.01 in 2480x1860 AMOLED (External) 6.52 in 2520x840 AMOLED	Android 10	Foldable phablet	
Xiaomi	Mix Fold 2	2022-08-11	(Internal) 8.02 in 2160x1914 AMOLED (External) 6.56 in 2520x1080 AMOLED	Android 12	Foldable phablet	
ZTE	Axon M	2017-10	(2) 5.2 in 1920x1080 LCD	Android 7.1.2	Smartphone	
