= Microsoft Courier =

Microsoft tablet prototype

Courier was a prototype concept by Microsoft for a dual-touchscreen tablet. The device was conceived as being a digital notebook, consisting of two 7-inch touchscreens hinged together like a book, and running a custom operating system built primarily around handwriting input and a notebook-like journal for storing notes, images, and clippings from web pages.

Reports had indicated that the system was largely developed outside of the normal development channels, and existence of the project was only known by a few key engineers. The project was considered to be a successor of Codex and InkSeine, two earlier Microsoft Research efforts. Microsoft had previously classified the project as an "incubation", which is further along than a "research" project but is not yet in the commercial pipeline.

In 2010, Microsoft confirmed that the project had ended and that they had no current plans to produce such a device. In October 2019, Microsoft unveiled an upcoming dual-screen tablet known as the Surface Neo, which has been widely-compared to Courier in terms of design and concept.

== Design ==
The tablet was reported to have two seven-inch screens with a flexible hinge to allow closure like a book. The outside of the hinge would have contained wireless signal and battery strength indicators, and a home button to interact with the system while the booklet was closed. Courier would have relied entirely on touch input and handwriting recognition, as no external keyboard would have been available. Reports indicated that it would have been powered by NVIDIA’s Tegra 250 processor and would have weighed a little over a pound.

A 3-megapixel digital camera with 4x zoom was integrated into the prototype system, and the final model might have contained an inductive charging pad for charging batteries wirelessly.

== Usage ==
The system's main purpose would have been to function as a personal notebook and day planner to track contacts, tasks, and appointments. Courier would have included applications such as Microsoft Paint and notepad to help users create and organize original content, as well as web and photo browsers, email applications, and possibly an e-reader.

=== Core operating system ===
The core operating system of the Courier was reportedly a specialized version of Microsoft Windows CE, however the Courier would not have allowed installation of native Windows applications onto the system. All Courier applications would have had to have been designed specifically for the Courier's booklet form factor. In addition, some reports had indicated that the Courier would incorporate a front-side video camera for live video conferencing (via Microsoft Messenger) on the left side of the notebook so that users could have edited documents or taken notes on the right side.

=== Infinite Journal ===
The primary interface of the Courier would have been the Infinite Journal, an electronic journal with an unlimited number of pages upon which users could have taken notes, dragged photos, sketched drawings, and stored "web clippings." Each page would have been stamped with the current time and location when each page was entered. These concepts are similar to the existing Windows Journal, which has been included in every version of Windows since XP. The mechanism for the location geotagging function might have come through an internal GPS, geolocation through IP connectivity through wireless access points, or through manual entry. Users might also have been able to highlight an infinite number of keywords to tag and index for future searching. The journal (in whole or in part) would have been able to be published online in several formats, including PDF and Microsoft PowerPoint documents.

The Infinite Journal concept reportedly originated from a desire to build Microsoft OneNote from scratch with the dual-screen booklet form factor in mind. This idea spawned from the popularity of the Franklin Covey planner products, which utilize the booklet design.

=== Smart Agenda ===
The "Smart Agenda" would have been a condensed summary of the Infinite Journal, in which hyperlinked content would bring the user to the appropriate pages of the Infinite Journal. The smart agenda would have coordinated daily activities, appointments, and tasks, as well as coordinating email and messaging.

=== Clip, Tuck, and Paste ===
An innovative feature of the Microsoft Courier would have been users' ability to "clip" content from web sites or emails, to "tuck" the clipping underneath the physical hinge of the journal, and then to flip the virtual pages until the clipping was pasted into the appropriate page. This differs from a traditional clipboard, in which copied items are not visible while on the clipboard, and are usually manipulated one at a time.

=== Touch ===
The Courier would have featured multi-touch and stylus operation. The stylus would have operated in several different modes, allowing users to easily toggle between writing, painting, and sketching. Additionally, the physical stylus would have been able to access some new editing functions. It would have contained two quick-access buttons: one would have switched between a writing pen and a marker-style input, the other would have served as a quick "undo" function. Twisting the stylus would have engaged Courier's drawing functionality, and flipping the stylus over (like a pencil) would have caused the stylus to erase content on the virtual page.

== End of development ==
On April 29, 2010, Microsoft confirmed that they will no longer support this project. The official statement was:

At any given time, across any of our business groups, there are new ideas being investigated, tested, and incubated. It's in Microsoft's DNA to continually develop and incubate new technologies to foster productivity and creativity. The "Courier" project is an example of this type of effort and its technologies will be evaluated for use in future Microsoft offerings, but we have no plans to build such a device at this time.

On The Official Microsoft Blog, Frank Shaw, the Microsoft vice president who made the statement, referenced the articles published about the cancellation of the project as "speculation" and re-quoted himself, leaving out the "but we have no plans to build such a device at this time" part.

In October 2017, it was reported that Microsoft was working on a new foldable digital ink device codenamed "Andromeda", based on the concept of the Courier. In October 2019, Microsoft unveiled an upcoming dual-screen tablet in the Surface family with strong similarities to the Courier concept, known as the Surface Neo. Microsoft emphasized its support of various "postures" to support different use cases and scenarios, including support for a stylus pen and a Bluetooth keyboard (which can attach to the bottom screen of the device to create a laptop-like experience, using the remainder of the screen as either a special toolbar or a touchpad depending on position). Microsoft concurrently unveiled a dual-touchscreen smartphone with a similar concept, the Surface Duo.

== See also ==
- Surface Duo
