= Toshiba Libretto =

Subnotebook computers

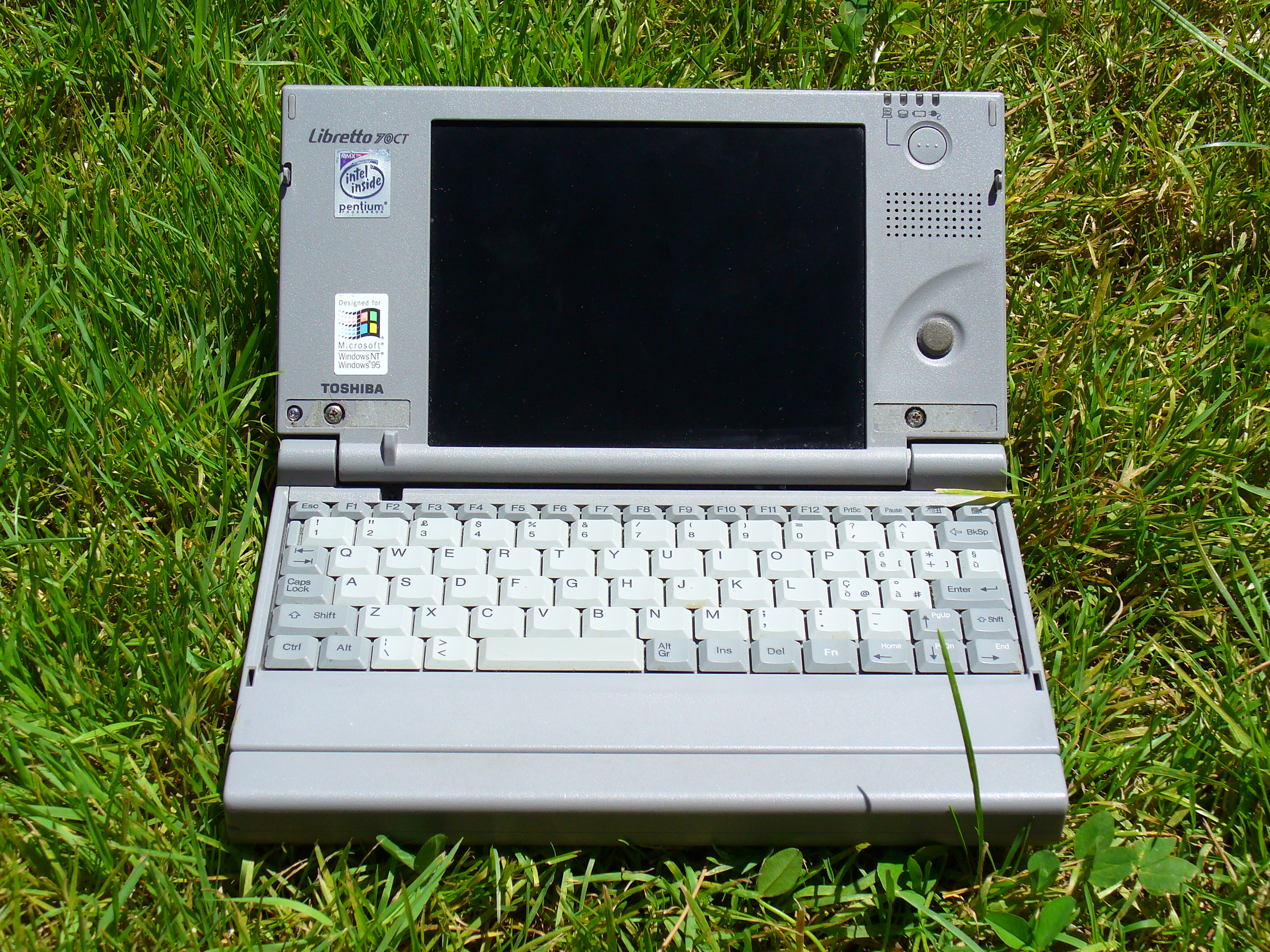
- Libretto 70CT
- Developer: Toshiba
- Manufacturer: Toshiba
- Type: Subnotebook
- Released: 1996; 30 years ago
- Lifespan: 1996–2002, 2005, 2010
- Discontinued: 2010
- Operating system: Windows
- Marketing target: Consumer

The Libretto (Italian for "booklet") is a line of subnotebook computers that was designed and produced by Toshiba. The line was distinguished by its combination of functionality and small size, squeezing a full Windows x86 PC into a device the size of a paperback book.

The first Libretto model, the Libretto 20, was released on April 17, 1996 (in Japan only), with a volume of 821 cm^{3} (50.1 cu in) and weighing just 840 g (30 oz), making it by far, the world's smallest commercially available Windows PC at the time, and a trend the Libretto range continued for many years. The original Libretto line was discontinued in Europe and the U.S. in 1999, but the production continued in Japan with the SS, FF and then the L series until 2002. The first L series Libretto, larger than the previous range, was released on 18 May 2001 and the last on 24 April 2002. Production of all Librettos ceased from 2002 until the release of the Libretto U100 in 2005. It was a further five years before the Libretto returned again in 2010 with the limited-edition W100 model, a dual-screen tablet.

== Models ==
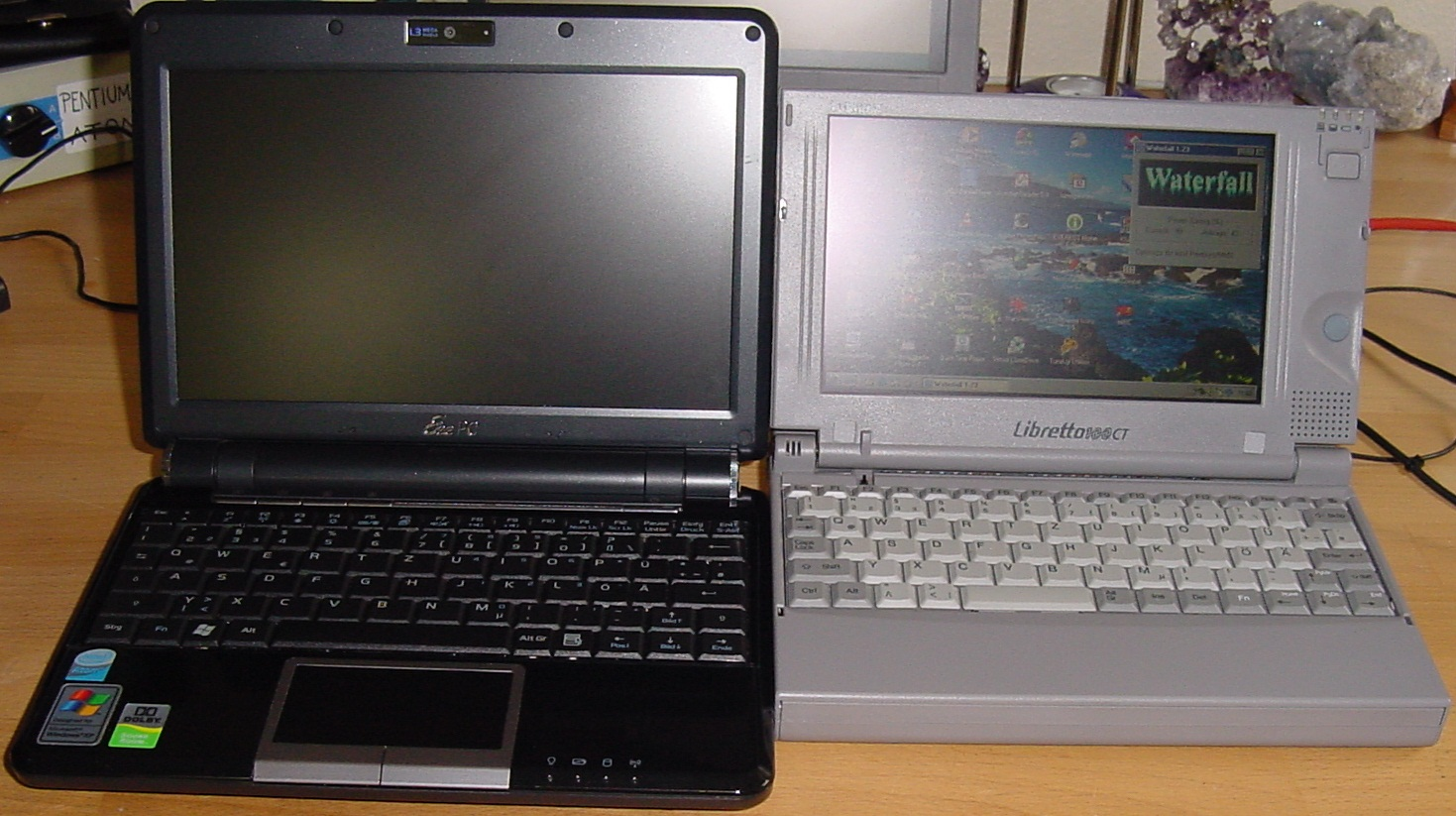
Libretto 100CT beside an Eee PC 901 (left)

There were many different models. The first Libretto models, the L20 & L30 used 486 processors from Advanced Micro Devices (AMD) and were only available in Japan (although the L30 was also assembled and marketed in South Korea under the Comos Brand name). Beginning with the Libretto 50, Toshiba used the Intel Pentium and later Pentium MMX processors. With the introduction of the L series in 2001, a move was made to the Transmeta Crusoe processor. The U100 of 2005 saw a return to Intel with the use of the Pentium M processor.

The following models were available:

Model	Specifications	Dimensions (mm)	Mass (g)
Libretto 20	AMD 486 DX4 75 MHz, 8 MB RAM (20 MB max.), 270 MB hard disk, 6.1" TFT display (released only in Japan)	210×115×34	840
Libretto 30	AMD 486 DX4 100 MHz, 8 MB RAM (20 MB max.), 500 MB hard disk, 6.1" TFT display (released only in Japan, & South Korea as COMOS Libretto 30)	210×115×34	840
Libretto M1	A rebadged Libretto 30 released by NTT DoCoMo (released only in Japan)	210×115×34	840
Libretto 50(CT)	Intel Pentium 75 MHz, 16 MB RAM (32 MB max.), 810 MB hard disk, 6.1-inch TFT display	210×115×34	850
Libretto 50M	Specification as Libretto 50 + 6.1" TFT touch-screen display specially built for the Meiji Life insurance company. Around 40,000 units were made (released only in Japan)	n/a	n/a
Libretto 60	Intel Pentium 100 MHz, 16 MB RAM (32 MB max.), 810 MB hard disk, 6.1" TFT display (released only in Japan)	210×115×34	850
Libretto M2	A rebadged Libretto 60, also known as the D2, released by NTT DoCoMo with PCMCIA Modem Card for use with the DoCoMo CDMA Network (released only in Japan)	210×115×34	850
Libretto 70(CT)	Intel Pentium 120 MHz MMX, 16 MB RAM (32 MB max.), 1.6 GB hard disk, 6.1" TFT display	210×115×34	850
Libretto 100(CT)	Intel Pentium 166 MHz MMX, 32 MB RAM (Officially 64 MB max. 96 MB max by modding SS/ff & Portege 3010 RAM Module.), 2.1 GB hard disk, 7.1" TFT display	210×132×35	950
Libretto SS1000	Intel Pentium 166 MHz MMX, 32 MB RAM (96 MB max.), 2.1 GB (6.5 mm high ) HDD, 6.1" TFT display (released only in Japan)	215×125×24.5	820
Libretto SS1010	Intel Pentium 233 MHz MMX, 64 MB RAM (96 MB max. Has 32 MB RAM on board.), 2.1 GB (6.5 mm high) HDD, 6.1" TFT display. (released only in Japan)	215×125×24.5	820
Libretto M3	Intel Pentium 133 MHz MMX, 32 MB RAM (96 MB max.), 2.1 GB hard disk, 6.1" TFT display. (released only in Japan by NTT DoCoMo)	210×115×34	850
Libretto 110(CT)	Intel Pentium 233 MHz MMX, 32 MB RAM (Officially 64 MB max. 96 MB max by modding SS/ff & Portege 3010 RAM Module.), 4.3 GB hard disk, 7.1" TFT display	210×132×35	950
Libretto ff 1050	Intel Pentium 233 MHz MMX, 32 MB RAM (Officially 96 MB max. 128 MB max once adding missing RAM chips to PCB.), 3.2 GB hard disk, 6" STN display. Optional multimedia remote (released only in Japan)	221×132×29.8	900
Libretto ff 1100	Intel Pentium 266 MHz MMX, 64 MB RAM (SO-DIMM expandable to 128 MB), 3.2 GB hard disk, 7.1" TFT display, built-in digital camera & multimedia remote controller (released only in Japan)	221×132×29.8	980
Libretto ff 1100v	As per ff1100 but with 6.4 GB hard disk (released only in Japan)	221×132×29.8	980

In 2001, Toshiba released the L series range of Librettos. This was the first major change of footprint since the range was first introduced and represented a significant improvement in performance over the previous models, however it also represented a significant increase in overall size. The L series had moved the Libretto range away from what was a UMPC, to that of an early Netbook.

The L1 had built-in USB and IEEE1394 Firewire. The L2 dropped the IEEE1394 in favor of an Ethernet port. The L5 was optionally available with built-in Wifi 802.11b. All models featured a widescreen display with the unusual resolution of 1280×600 pixels.

Like the majority of Librettos models produced, the L series were not officially available outside Japan.

Model	Specifications	Dimensions (mm)	Mass (g)
Libretto L1	Transmeta Crusoe 600 MHz, 128 MB RAM (368 MB max.), 10 GB hard disk, 10" TFT display	268×167.2×20.5	1100
Libretto L2	Transmeta Crusoe 600 MHz, 128 MB RAM (368 MB max.), 10 GB hard disk, 10" TFT display	268×167.2×20.5	1100
Libretto L3	Transmeta Crusoe 600 MHz, 128 MB RAM (368 MB max.), 20 GB hard disk, 10" TFT display	268×167.2×20.5	1100
L3 Adidas Edition	As per L3 but White with Adidas branding and matching Adidas Softcase	268×167.2×20.5	1100
Libretto L5	Transmeta Crusoe 800 MHz, 256 MB RAM (512 MB max.), 20 GB hard disk, 10" TFT display	268×167.2×20.5	1100

In 2005, Toshiba announced a new model, the Libretto U100:

Model	Specifications	Dimensions (mm)	Mass (g)
Libretto U100	Intel Pentium M 753 @ 1.2 GHz, 512 MB RAM (1 GB max.), 60 GB HDD (1.8in IDE / ATA 1.8" ZIF, the most common drive in this machine is the MK6006GAH), 7.2 in TFT active matrix LCD	210×165×29.8	980
Libretto U105	As per U100 with different bundled options	210×165×29.8	980
Libretto U100-S213	US market version. As per U100.	210×165×29.8	980

All three of the above were essentially the same machine but with different options. The U100 was available in Europe in these variants:

- 30 GB HDD (with Win XP Home)
- 60 GB HDD (with XP Pro), both versions included the DVD dock
- In Japan the clock speed was only 1.1 GHz
- In some markets the DVD dock was an optional or bundled accessory

In 2010, Toshiba announced a new Tablet Libretto model, the W100:

Model	Specifications	Dimensions (mm)	Mass (g)
Libretto W100	Intel Pentium U5400 1.2 GHz, 2 GB DDR3 RAM (2 GB max.), 62 GB SSD, two 7-inch multi-touch TFT displays with Windows 7 Home Premium	202x123x30.7	819 (with 8-cell battery)

The W100 was released in August 2010, as a limited-edition model and was only available for a short time. It was available in both English and Japanese versions. There is no VGA port on the W100, the keyboard is virtual (standard, split, or 10-key numeric). The display can be viewed in portrait or landscape mode, though portrait is limited to one direction of change. The case has metal top.
