= Surface Duo =

Dual-screen Android smartphone

Microsoft Surface Duo
- Brand: Microsoft Surface
- Type: Foldable smartphone
- First released: September 10, 2020; 6 years ago
- Successor: Surface Duo 2
- Related: Surface Neo
- Form factor: Folio
- Dimensions: 145.2 mm (5.72 in) H 93.3 mm (3.67 in) W 9.9 mm (0.39 in) D (folded)
- Operating system: Original: Android 10; Current: Android 12L
- System-on-chip: Qualcomm Snapdragon 855
- Memory: 6 GB LPDDR4X
- Storage: 128 or 256 GB
- Battery: 3577 mAh
- Front camera: 11 MP f/2.0, 1.0 μm, PDAF and 84.0° diagonal FOV
- Display: Dual 5.6 inches (140 mm) 1800×1350 AMOLED, 401 PPI
- Connectivity: 802.11ac (2.4/5GHz), Bluetooth 5.0, LTE: 4x4 MIMO, Cat.18 DL / Cat 5 UL, 5CA, LAA
- Development status: Discontinued
- Website: www.surface.com www.surface.com/business

The Surface Duo is a discontinued dual-touchscreen Android-based smartphone manufactured by Microsoft. Announced during a hardware-oriented event on October 2, 2019, and officially released on September 10, 2020, it is part of the Microsoft Surface series of touchscreen hardware devices, and the first device in the line that does not run Windows. It also marks Microsoft's first smartphone since the dissolution of Microsoft Mobile and the Windows Phone platform.

The Surface Duo received mixed reviews, with critics praising its design and battery life, but mixed on its multitasking features, software quality, and believing that its hardware (including its RAM, camera, and wireless network support) was outdated and underpowered for its class. A successor, the Surface Duo 2, was unveiled in September 2021. Microsoft released the final security update for the Surface Duo on September 10, 2023.

== Specifications ==
=== Hardware ===
The Surface Duo is a folio-styled device, with two 5.6-inch OLED displays with a 4:3 aspect ratio. When unfolded, they form an 8.1-inch surface with a 3:2 aspect ratio and total resolution of 2700×1800. The 360-degree hinge allows the device to be used in several "postures", including being fully unfolded as a flat surface, a landscape mode where the virtual keyboard occupies the entirety of the bottom screen, and the other screen folded backwards for single-screen use. It is compatible with Surface Pen styluses.

It uses a Qualcomm Snapdragon 855 system-on-chip with 6 GB of RAM. Microsoft stated that it worked with Qualcomm to optimize the device for multitasking. The device contains two batteries with a total capacity of 3577 mAh, which are split between the two halves. The Surface Duo is sold in models with 128 and 256 GB of non-expandable internal storage.

The Surface Duo includes an 11-megapixel camera; nominally front-facing, it can be used like a rear-facing camera when the other screen is folded backwards. When unveiling the Surface Duo, Microsoft avoided referring to the device as being a "phone", with chief product officer Panos Panay primarily referring to it as a "Surface device".

=== Software ===
The Surface Duo ships with Android 10 and Google Mobile Services, and is pre-loaded with both Google and Microsoft-developed apps. The two displays are designed to act like a multi-monitor configuration on a PC; individual apps can be displayed across the displays, an app on one display can open external links on the other, and supported apps can display different views on each display. Microsoft stated that it would contribute the associated APIs for these features to the upstream Android Open Source Project (AOSP), so that this functionality could be leveraged by other dual-screen and foldable smartphones.

Microsoft committed to upgrading the Surface Duo to Android 11 by the end of 2021. The update was released in February 2022. Android 12 L was released in October 2022, seven months after its release. Microsoft stated that the update would include visual elements of Windows 11 and Fluent Design System. The ARM version of Windows 11 was adapted to function on Surface Duo by a third-party developer. On September 10, 2023, Microsoft stopped releasing all updates for the device, including security patches.

== Reception ==
The Verge noted that the Surface Duo was thin and had a relatively light weight for its class, and observed that its design "encourages you to be intentional with your use of the device and to be intentional in not using it." It was felt that the dual-screen configuration of the Surface Duo made multitasking more natural and less "tacked on[to]" Android than other devices, and that apps such as Amazon Kindle and Microsoft Outlook were well-optimized to the dual-screen setup. The camera was criticized for its placement on the device and its low quality (being described as akin to a webcam and poor for a $300 phone, let alone one that cost $1,400), and the device was also panned for being underpowered for its class (including a lack of support for 5G and NFC, and an insufficient amount of RAM for a multitasking-oriented device), although noting that Microsoft had likely used the time since the 2019 announcement to optimize its software to the Snapdragon 855. In conclusion, it was felt that "there are more than a few glimmers of vision and potential in the Surface Duo", but that "the execution is bad in places, and a lot of people aren’t going to get what Microsoft is going for."

Mary Jo Foley of ZDNet described the Duo's hardware as "premium and drool-worthy", and found it to be the first Surface-branded device that was able to fulfill Microsoft's promise of "all-day" battery life, but felt that its multitasking systems were not intuitive (drawing comparisons to Windows 8, which "assume[d] users can easily figure out how to do basic things and errs on the side of providing too little information"). IFixit gave the Surface Duo a repairability score of 2/10, citing that although its displays and black glass "can be replaced without disassembling any other components", its construction contained extensive use of adhesive, and that its USB port was soldered directly to its mainboard.

== Timeline ==
Timeline of Surface devices
Sources: Microsoft Devices Blog Microsoft Surface Store Microsoft Surface for Business store

== See also ==
- Microsoft Courier
- Nokia X family
- Microsoft Lumia 650
- iPhone Duo
