= Surface Neo =

Microsoft Surface foldable device

- Codename: Centaurus
- Also known as: Microsoft Neo, Microsoft Surface Neo
- Developer: Microsoft
- Product family: Microsoft Surface
- Operating system: Windows 10X
- Related: Surface Duo
- Website: "New Surface Neo – Microsoft Surface". Archived from the original on October 1, 2020.

The Surface Neo is an unreleased dual-touchscreen 2-in-1 PC that was unveiled by Microsoft on October 2, 2019. Slated to be part of the Microsoft Surface family of devices, the Surface Neo was designed to be used in various "postures" for different use cases and multitasking scenarios involving its screens, and feature Windows 10X—a variant of Windows 10 designed exclusively for dual-screen devices. However, as of October 2025, over five years after the Surface Neo was announced, it is still unreleased, likely rendering it vaporware.

The Surface Neo was expected to be launched in late-2020, alongside a range of other Windows 10X devices from third-party manufacturers. In May 2020, Microsoft postponed the release of Windows 10X-based dual-screen devices in favor of launching it with single-screen devices instead. This did not come to fruition, and Microsoft eventually cancelled Windows 10X outright in May 2021, with aspects of 10X repurposed for the mainstream Windows 11. Its sister device, the Android-based Surface Duo, was released in September 2020.

== Background ==
Microsoft had first envisioned a dual-touchscreen device with its Courier concept, while rumors surfaced in 2017 of a similar project codenamed "Andromeda"—a foldable device which would use electronic paper displays.

During a Surface hardware event on October 2, 2019, Microsoft unveiled a pair of dual-touchscreen devices—the Android-based Surface Duo smartphone, and the Surface Neo. Codenamed "Centaurus", head of Windows Client Experiences Joe Belfiore explained that "we saw an opportunity both at Microsoft and with our partners to fill in some of the gaps in [laptop and tablet] experiences and offer something new". Microsoft unveiled an accompanying operating system known as Windows 10X (codenamed "Santorini"), and stated that the OS, as well as dual-screen devices from Microsoft and other OEM partners, would be released in late-2020.

== Specifications ==
=== Hardware ===
Microsoft did not provide any specific information on the specifications of the Surface Neo, except that all Windows 10X devices launching in 2020 would use Intel "Lakefield" processors. Prototypes of the Neo reportedly used an Intel Core i5-L16G7 processor with 8 GB of RAM, and had dual 9-inch 1440p displays.

=== Software ===
The Surface Neo was planned to run Windows 10X, an edition of Windows 10 designed exclusively for dual-touchscreen and folding devices. It featured noticeable changes to the Windows user interface, including a centered taskbar, and an updated Start menu using a grid of pinned applications (as opposed to Windows 10's existing "live tiles"). It also contained architectural differences, including having Win32 software running within a sandbox environment for security reasons, and to control power consumption (with apps automatically paused after a period of inactivity).

The OS was designed to respond to various "postures", such as spanning an application across both screens like a book, using separate applications on the two screens, standing up with a wireless external keyboard ("portable all-in-one"), or like a laptop—with the lower screen dedicated to a virtual keyboard or partially covered by a physical keyboard accessory. In both cases, the portion of the lower screen not used by the keyboard would contain the "Wonder Bar" (comparable to the "touch bar" of MacBook Pro laptops of the era), which could be used for functions such as an emoji picker, note taking, or video. It could also be used like a laptop touchpad.

Vice President of Experiences and Devices Joe Belfiore stated that Windows 10X was "evolving the core of Windows 10", and that Microsoft was "working to take the best of the applications that people need and use most — things like Mail, Calendar, and PowerPoint — and bring them over to dual screens in a way that creates flexible and rich experiences that are unique to this OS and devices".

== Aborted release ==
In May 2020, amid the COVID-19 pandemic, Microsoft changed its plans for Windows 10X; chief product officer for Microsoft Windows and Office Panos Panay announced that Microsoft and its partners planned to launch Windows 10X with only single-screen devices, stating that "we need to focus on meeting customers where they are now", and would "continue to look for the right moment, in conjunction with our OEM partners, to bring dual-screen devices to market". However, this did not occur, and Windows 10X was ultimately cancelled the following year. Aspects of the OS were eventually incorporated into Windows 11.

Microsoft released the Surface Neo's Android counterpart, the Surface Duo, in September 2020, but the Neo was quietly shelved, with no confirmation from Microsoft beyond the postponement of dual-screen devices and the cancellation of its planned operating system. Reports from testers indicated that the Neo felt cramped to use in a laptop posture due to its 9-inch displays, and that the prototype models were prone to overheating.

In a 2022 interview, Microsoft chief product officer Panos Panay stated of devices such as the Surface Neo that "Whether it’s two screens or a foldable, I do think these are realities to the future of products being made, no doubt. Or a rollable for that matter, a rollable screen. It’s maybe not something I’ve decided on, but for sure how do we serve the form factor that’s going to adapt to the person I think is the way to think about it."

== Timeline ==
Timeline of Surface devices
Sources: Microsoft Devices Blog Microsoft Surface Store Microsoft Surface for Business store
