= W100 =

W100 may refer to:

== Automobiles ==
- Dodge Power Wagon W100, a medium duty truck
- Mercedes-Benz W100, a luxury car
- Toyota Avanza (W100), a MPV

== Consumer electronics ==
- LG W100, a smartwatch
- Sony Cyber-shot DSC-W100, a digital camera
- Toshiba Libretto W100, a laptop

== Other uses ==
- Small dodecahemicosahedron
- W100, a classification in masters athletics
