= LG V50 ThinQ =

2019 Android phone manufactured by LG Electronics

LG V50 ThinQ 5G
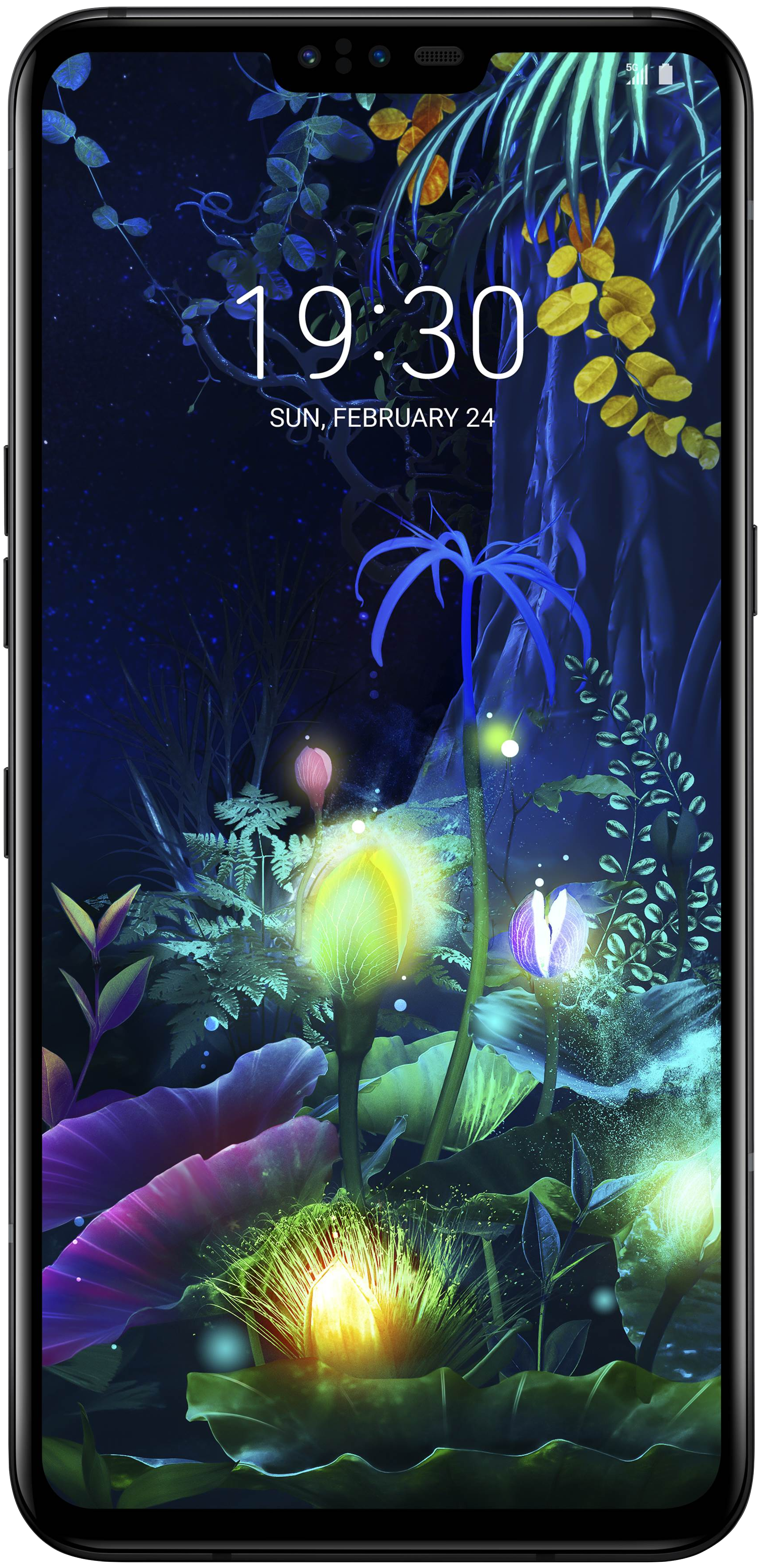
- Brand: LG Electronics
- Manufacturer: LG Electronics
- Type: Phablet
- Series: V series
- First released: 10 May 2019; 7 years ago
- Predecessor: LG V40 ThinQ
- Successor: LG V60 ThinQ
- Related: LG G8 ThinQ
- Compatible networks: 2G GSM/GPRS/EDGE – 850, 900, 1800, 1900 MHz; 2G CDMA 1xRTT – 800, 1900 MHz; 3G UMTS/HSDPA/HSUPA/HSPA+ – 850, 900, AWS (1700), 1900, 2000, 2100 MHz; 4G LTE – Bands 1–5, 7–8, 12–14, 17–20, 25–26, 28–30, 38–41, 46–71; 5G
- Form factor: Slate
- Operating system: Android 9.0 with LG UX, upgradable to Android 12
- System-on-chip: Qualcomm Snapdragon 855
- GPU: Adreno 640
- Memory: 6 GB RAM
- Storage: 128 GB
- Removable storage: microSDXC, expandable up to 512 GB
- Battery: Non-removable Li-po 4000mAh
- Rear camera: 12 MP IMX363 Exmor RS, 27mm (standard), f/1.5, 1/2.6", 1.4 μm, 3-axis OIS, dual pixel PDAF 12 MP s5k3m5, 52mm (telephoto), f/2.4, 1.0 μm, 2x optical zoom, OIS, PDAF 16 MP IMX351 Exmor RS, 16.9mm (ultrawide), f/1.9, 1/3.1", 1.0 μm, no Auto Focus
- Front camera: 8 MP, 26mm (standard), f/1.9, 1.4 μm 5 MP, 21mm (wide), f/2.2, 1.4 μm
- Display: 6.4 in (163 mm); 3120x1440 1440p P-OLED (19.5:9 aspect ratio) (538 ppi) Dolby Vision; HDR10
- Sound: Dual stereo "boombox" speaker 3.5mm headphone jack 32-bit/192kHz audio 24-bit/48kHz audio recording Active noise cancellation with dedicated mic DTS: X Surround Sound, tuned with Meridian Audio
- Connectivity: Wi-Fi 802.11a/b/g/n/ac (2.4 & 5GHz), Bluetooth 5 with aptX, 4G/LTE
- Other: IP68 resistant, MIL-STD-810G compliant, Secondary screen case support
- Website: www.lg.com/us/mobile-phones/v50-thinq-5g

The LG V50 ThinQ, commonly referred to as the LG V50, is an Android phablet smartphone manufactured by LG Electronics as part of the LG V series. It was announced in February 2019 and is the successor to the LG V40 ThinQ.

== Specifications ==
=== Design and Hardware ===
The V50 is largely identical to the V40 externally, albeit with a flush rear camera similarly to the LG G8 and a 5G logo above which lights up in different colors depending on the carrier. As with the V40 and V30, an anodized aluminum frame is used, with Gorilla Glass 5 on the front and Gorilla Glass 6 on the back. In a departure from past V-series phones, the V50 is only available in one color, New Aurora Black. The V50 uses the Snapdragon 855 processor with the Adreno 640 GPU, and supports 5G. It is available with 6 GB of LPDDR4X RAM and 128 GB of UFS storage. MicroSD card expansion is supported up to 1 TB with a single-SIM or dual-SIM setup. The display is the same as the V40's, a 6.4-inch (162.6mm) 1440p P-OLED panel with a 19.5:9 aspect ratio. The device has stereo speakers with active noise cancellation and a 3.5mm audio jack. The battery is larger at 4000mAh, and can be recharged at 18W wired over USB-C or 10W wirelessly (Qi). Biometric options include a capacitive (rear-mounted) fingerprint sensor and facial recognition. An IP68 rating is also present. To compete with folding smartphones, the device offers a case accessory known as "LG DualScreen", which contains a second, 6.2-inch 1080p display panel. It is powered using pogo pin connectors on the phone, but communicates wirelessly. The camera layout is retained from the V40 as well, with a 12 MP primary lens, a 12 MP telephoto lens and a 16 MP ultrawide lens. Optical image stabilization and phase-detection autofocus are present on the primary and telephoto sensors. The V50 can record 4K video at 30 or 60 fps, and 1080p video at 30, 60 or 240 fps. On the front of the device, dual cameras are located within the notch, an 8 MP primary lens and a 5 MP wide lens.

=== Software ===
The V50 ships with Android 9.0 "Pie" and uses LG's UX 8.

== Reception ==
At launch, the V50 received mixed reviews from critics. Digital Trends was unimpressed by the V50, concluding that "the promise of 5G may not be enough to stir interest in the uninspired LG V50 ThinQ. Chokkattu stated that "we found the image quality to be lacking when compared to competitors" and criticized the user interface as being "clunky and cluttered", but praised the second screen for having a "polished experience". Several reviewers thought the phone was too expensive, with CNET stating that "unless you have a big budget and want to be on the absolute bleeding edge of network technology, investing in such a pricey 5G phone now is just not worth it". TechRadar praised the display and camera versatility, but criticized the design, calling it dated. PC Magazine was positive of the audio quality and performance, while noting that battery life was average despite the increase in capacity. Tom's Guide had similar views, stating that having faster 5G speeds "[isn't] enough to justify its steep price, especially when you consider its poor battery life and dated design".
