= Vivo X Note =

Smartphone manufactured by Vivo

- Brand: Vivo
- Manufacturer: Vivo
- Type: Phablet
- Series: Vivo X series
- First released: April 11, 2022; 4 years ago
- Predecessor: Vivo NEX 3S
- Related: Vivo X80; Vivo X Fold
- Compatible networks: 2G / 3G / 4G LTE / 5G NR
- Form factor: Slate
- Dimensions: 168.8 mm (6.65 in) H 80.3 mm (3.16 in) W 8.4 mm (0.33 in) D
- Weight: 216 g (7.6 oz)
- Operating system: Android 12 with Origin OS Ocean
- System-on-chip: Qualcomm Snapdragon 8 Gen 1 (4 nm)
- CPU: Octa-core (1×3.00 GHz Cortex-X2 & 3×2.50 GHz Cortex-A710 & 4×1.80 GHz Cortex-A510)
- GPU: Adreno 730
- Memory: 8 GB, 12 GB RAM
- Storage: 256 GB, 512 GB
- Removable storage: None
- SIM: Nano-SIM
- Battery: 5000mAh
- Charging: Fast charging 80W
- Rear camera: 50 MP, f/1.6, (wide), 1/1.31", 1.2 μm, PDAF, Laser AF, OIS; 8 MP, f/3.4, 125mm (periscope telephoto), PDAF, OIS, 5x optical zoom 12 MP, f/2.0, 47mm (telephoto), 1/2.93", 1.2 μm, PDAF, 2x optical zoom 48 MP, f/2.2, 14mm, 114˚ (ultrawide), 1/2.0", 0.8 μm Zeiss optics, Zeiss T* lens coating, Dual-LED flash, panorama 8K@30fps, 4K@30/60fps, 1080p@30/60fps, gyro-EIS
- Front camera: 16 MP, f/2.5, (wide); 1080p@30fps
- Display: 7.0 in (180 mm); 1440 x 3080 resolution (~486 ppi density); LTPO AMOLED, 120Hz refresh rate, HDR10+
- Sound: Stereo speakers
- Connectivity: Wi-Fi 802.11 a/b/g/n/ac/6, dual-band, Wi-Fi Direct, hotspot Bluetooth 5.2, A2DP, LE, aptX HD
- Water resistance: IP68 dust/water resistant (up to 1.5m for 30 mins)

Vivo X Note is an Android-based phablet developed and manufactured by Vivo. This phone was announced on 11 April 2022.
