= Windows 10X =

Cancelled edition of Windows 10/early beta of windows 11

- Version of the Windows 10 operating system

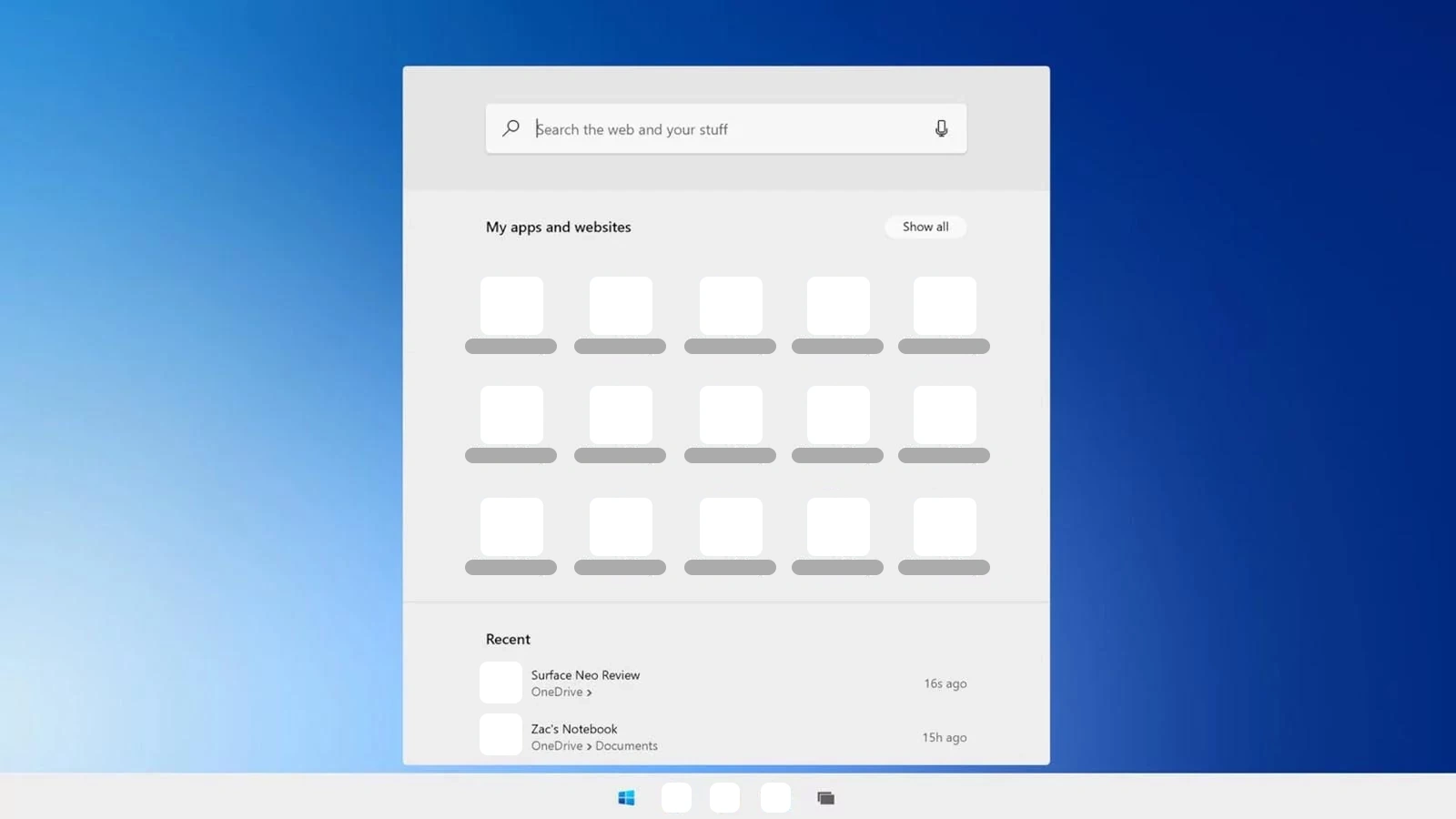
- Screenshot of Windows 10X
- Developer: Microsoft
- OS family: Microsoft Windows 10
- Working state: Scrapped
- Source model: Closed-source
- Initial release: 2020 (planned launch)
- Update method: Windows Update
- Kernel type: Hybrid (Windows NT kernel)
- Succeeded by: Windows 11 (2021)

Support status
- No support was ever issued; cancelled in 2021

Windows 10X is a cancelled edition of Windows 10, a major release of the Microsoft Windows series of operating systems. Announced by Microsoft on October 2, 2019, it was initially developed as an operating system to support dual-screen devices, such as the unreleased Surface Neo. 10X was expected to be released in 2020, but Microsoft later announced that the project had been cancelled in May 2021. Some features and design changes from 10X were integrated into the newer Windows 11. While the operating system was originally designed for dual-screen devices, Windows 10X shifted its target to single-screen devices in 2020 due to increasing demand for traditional computers from the COVID-19 pandemic.

== Features ==
=== New and changed ===
Windows 10X introduced major changes to the Windows shell, abolishing legacy components in favor of new user experiences and enhanced security, as well as some notable design changes, which were integrated into Windows 11:

- The taskbar was centered. It had 3 different sizes: small, intended for mouse-controlled desktop computers, and medium and large intended for touch computers
- The taskbar was automatically hidden and could be clicked/tapped to be shown.
- New Start menu: Microsoft redesigned the Start menu with a focus on productivity, with the search box now at the top instead of in the taskbar like in other editions of Windows 10, as well as a section of pinned apps which is the successor to the Live Tiles from other Windows 10 editions and 8.
- The Action Center had been renamed “Quick Settings” and was given a redesign. Network/Internet controls, volume controls, and power options were moved to Quick Settings. There was also an area to check notifications and control music playback from a specific app.
- Window borders were rounded.
- The out-of-the-box setup was updated to better fit the new user interface of 10X, with a more modern design as well as Cortana no longer being an integrated feature.
- The default UI used a lighter theme than a dark one.
- Windows Update improvements: The Windows Update method was improved to complete faster. Feature updates are automatically installed in the background and are supposed to reboot only when required.
- Enhanced security: 10X introduced a new security system dubbed “State Separation”; instead of installing every file (including the user’s, the system’s, the applications’, etc.) into a single, accessible partition, which allowed attackers and malware to easily access system files, 10X installed system, application and other important files into a read-only partition, while leaving the user files in a separate, accessible partition. Therefore, the users and apps can only access files in the user partition.

== Cancellation ==
In May 2021, Microsoft announced that 10X was cancelled, but new features and design changes would be integrated into other Microsoft products (such as Windows 11).

Some builds of Windows 10X were leaked before its cancellation.
