= Acer Iconia 6120 =

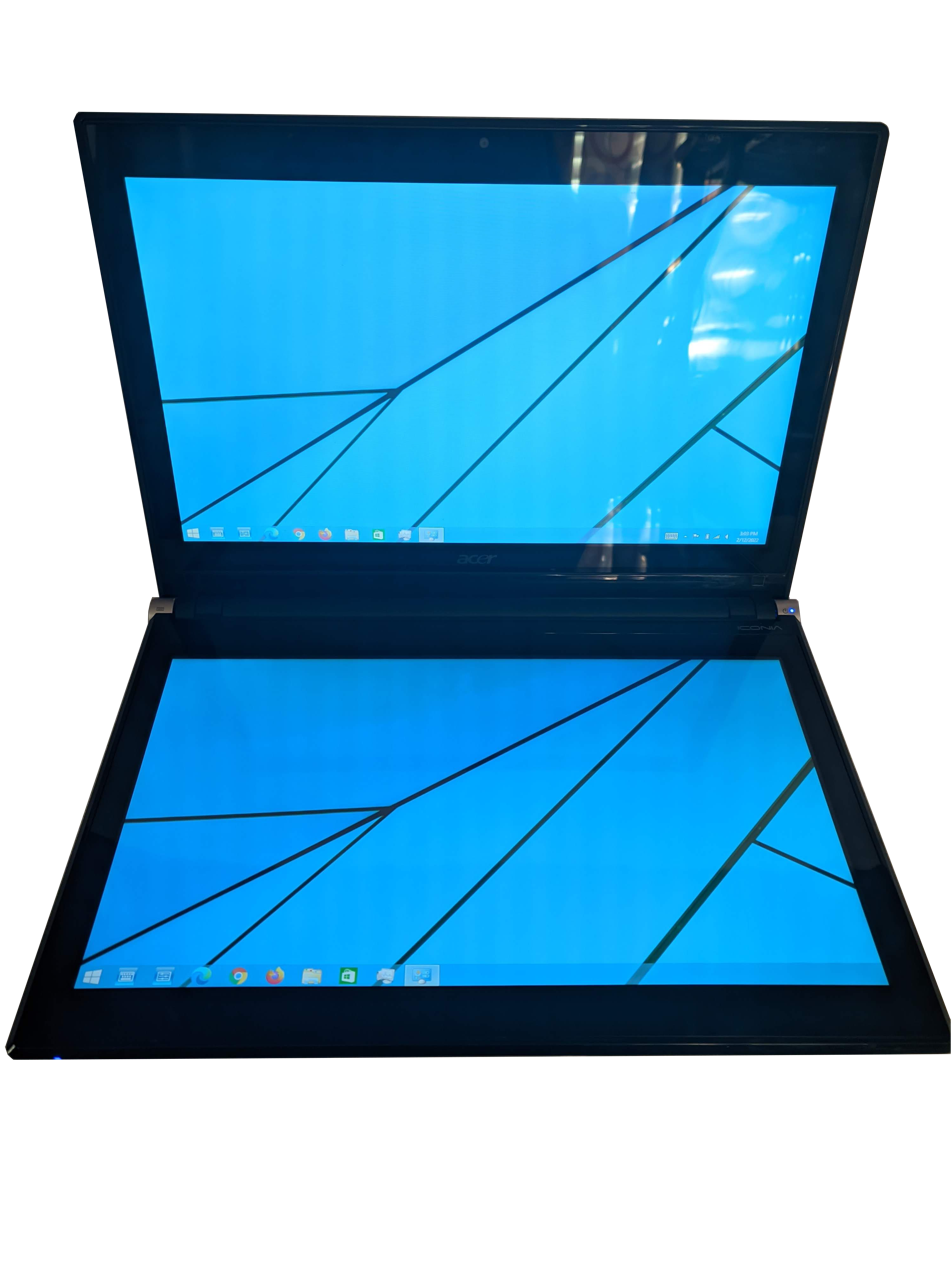
- Iconia 6120 Running Windows 8
- Product family: Iconia
- Released: January, 2011
- Introductory price: £1500
- Operating system: Windows 7 Home Premium
- CPU: Intel Core i5-480M; 2.66 up to 2.93 GHz, 3 MB cache, 35W
- Memory: 4 GB
- Storage: Sata HDD 640 GB 5,400rpm
- Display: 2x 14 inches 1366x768 (110 PPI) LCD
- Camera: 1.3 MP
- Power: Swappable Battery
- Dimensions: 13.5 in × 9.7 in × 1.2 in (343 mm × 246 mm × 30 mm)
- Weight: 6 lb (2,700 g)

The Acer Iconia Tab 6120 is a touch screen tablet computer made by Acer and unveiled on 23 November 2010. The Iconia was first announced at an Acer press conference in New York City on 23 November 2010. The device was released in January 2011 in the United States, and earlier in Europe, though the exact dates are not known. In Europe, it is priced at €1500 and £1500, while the price in the US was not set at the time of its release.

== Design and software ==
It is constructed out of a pair of 14 inches (36 cm) LCD screens, attached with a hinge in the manner of a traditional laptop, but with a screen replacing the keyboard. The device weighs 6.1 pounds (2.8 kg) and is equipped with Windows 7, and a proprietary Acer operating system for the touchscreen interface. The Iconia is also to operate Acer programs for accessing multimedia and other content, including Alive, a program for downloading content such as music, videos and application, and Clear.Fi, designed to enable content to be shared among multiple devices over the internet.

== Specifications ==
Acer Iconia is equipped with a 640GB hard drive, and has four gigabytes of RAM. Its processor is an Intel Core i5-480M unit, running at 2.67 GHz. There are two USB 2.0 ports, a single USB 3.0 port, and a HDMI-out port. A 1.3 megapixel webcam, Wi-Fi n and Bluetooth connectivity are also provided.

== Reviews ==
Initial reactions to the device were mixed, with both CNET and Engadget commenting positively on Iconia's touch-screen software, though the keyboard was criticized and some features were considered to be "perhaps an unnecessary visual gloss." The screens were said to be glossy and prone to glare, though clear in good conditions.

== Alternate Operating System ==
=== Linux ===
The integrated GPU is well-supported starting with the 3.1 version of the Linux kernel. Before that, one might need to disable the Kernel Mode Setting.

Proper support of the second screen was integrated in the 3.2-rc6 version of the Linux kernel, making it available for the 3.2 release in December 2011.

== See also ==
- Acer Tablet
- ASUS Eee Pad Transformer
- Motorola Xoom
- T-Mobile G-Slate
- Samsung Galaxy Tab 10.1
- Dual-touchscreen
