= Kyocera Echo =

Smartphone model

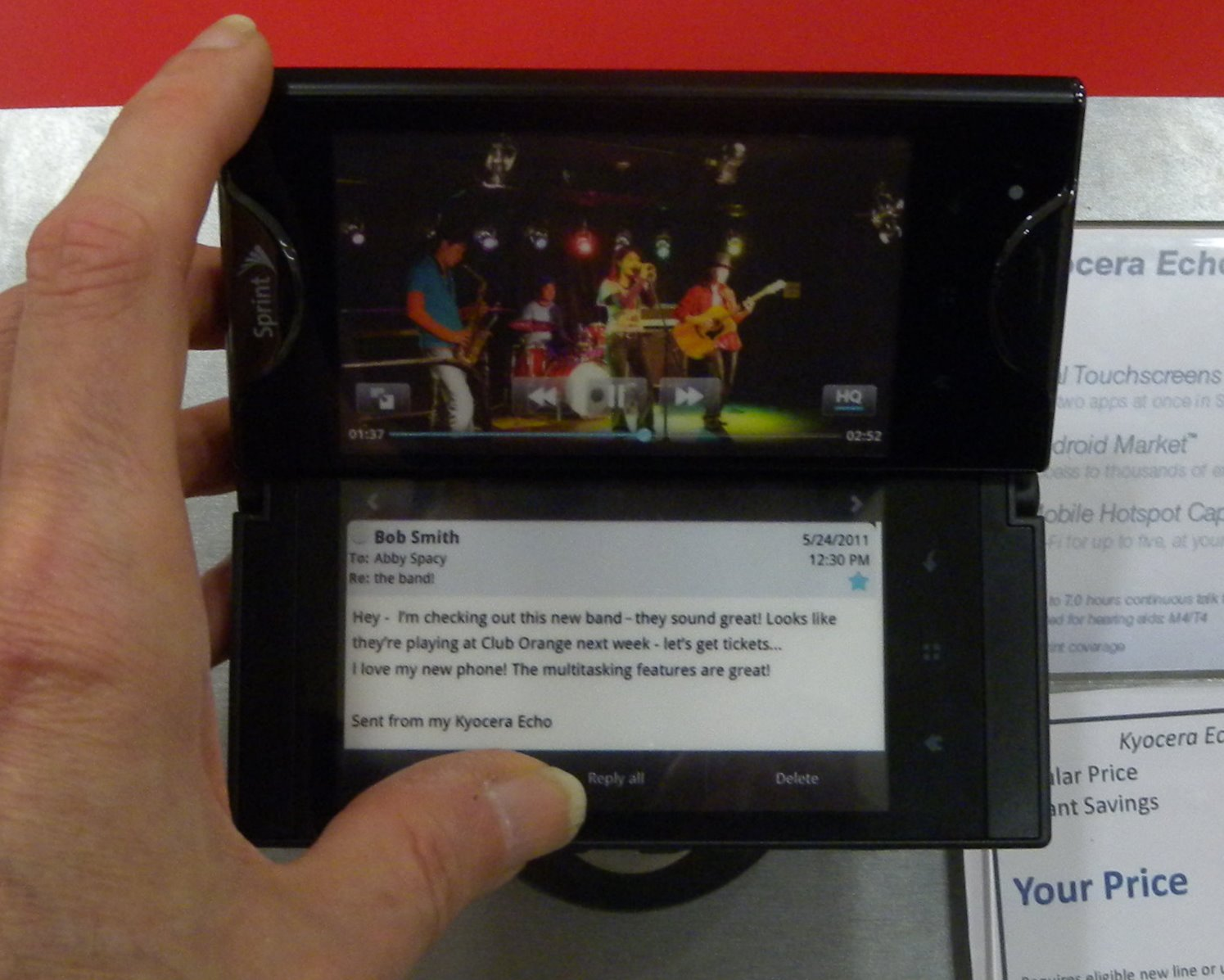
- "Simul-task" mode
- Manufacturers: Kyocera Communications, Inc.
- Type: Smartphone
- Availability by region: United States April 17, 2011 (Sprint)
- Form factor: Slate
- Dimensions: 115.0 mm (4.53 in) H 56.5 mm (2.22 in) W 17.2 mm (0.68 in) D
- Weight: 193 g (6.8 oz)
- Operating system: Original: Android 2.2.1 "Froyo" Current: Android 2.3.4 "Gingerbread"
- CPU: 1 GHz Qualcomm Snapdragon S1 QSD8650
- GPU: Adreno 200
- Memory: 8 GB microSD card; supports cards up to 32 GB
- Battery: Talk time: up to 7 hours
- Rear camera: 5-megapixel, 720p video capture
- Display: 3.5 in (89 mm), 800 x 480 px WVGA 262 K color TFT x2; 4.7 in (120 mm) total
- Connectivity: Wi-Fi (802.11 b/g) hotspot, supports up to 5 devices; 3.5 mm stereo headset jack

The Kyocera Echo (sometimes referred to as Sprint Echo) is a smartphone manufactured by Kyocera of Japan, and distributed by Sprint in the United States. It runs the Google Android operating system. It was announced by Sprint on 7 February 2011, and released for sale 17 April 2011.

It is unusual in having two 3.5-inch screens that, when juxtaposed in "tablet mode" create one 4.7-inch screen. Sprint claims it as the "first dual-screen smart phone". When using the device, the screens can be used in four modes:

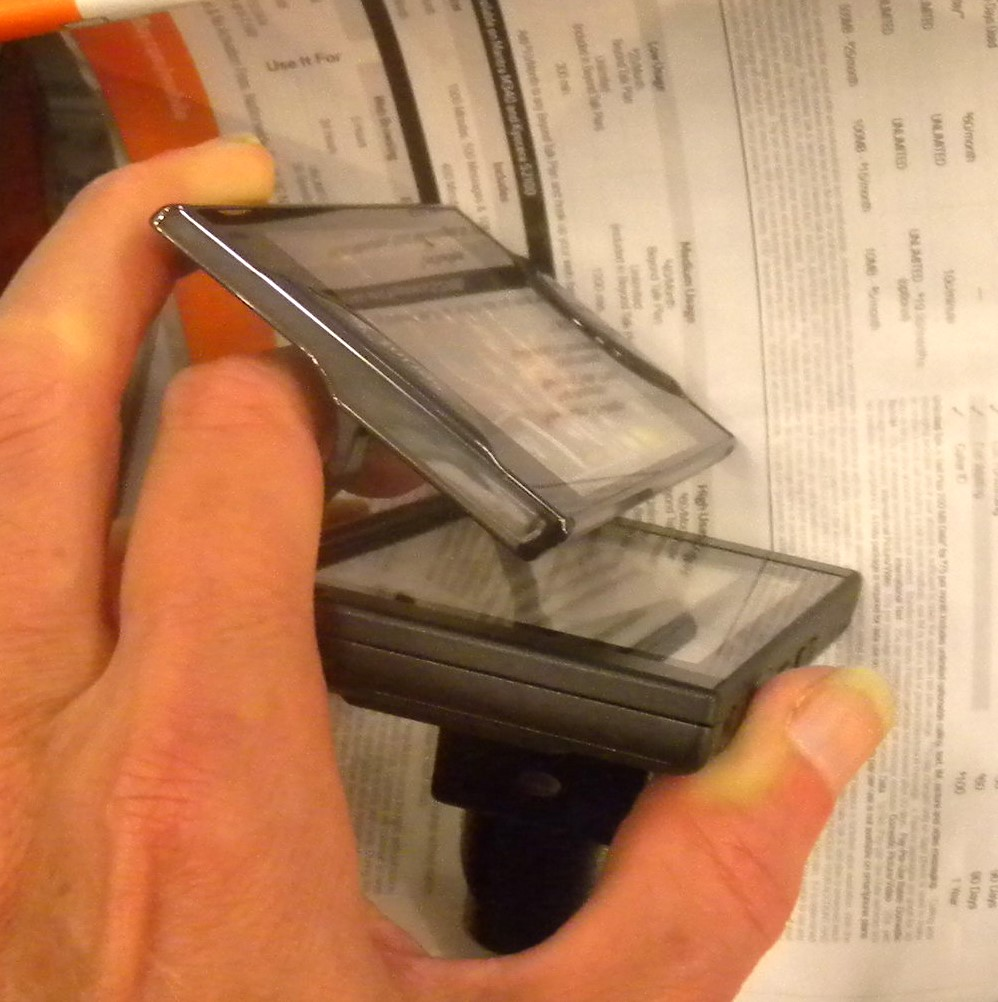
Hinge

1. Tablet mode, where the two screens form one 4.7" image.
2. Optimized mode, where each screen shows a different part of one application. For example, one can open up "optimized applications" on the device such as email, where the top screen shows a selected email message and the bottom screen shows the user inbox.
3. "Simul-Task" mode, where one application will run on the top screen while a separate application runs on the bottom screen.
4. Single-Screen mode, where the device is folded and the bottom screen is concealed, making only the top primary 3.5-inch screen usable.
