= EnTourage eDGe =

Tablet computer/e-book reader hybrid

enTourage eDGe v. 2.5
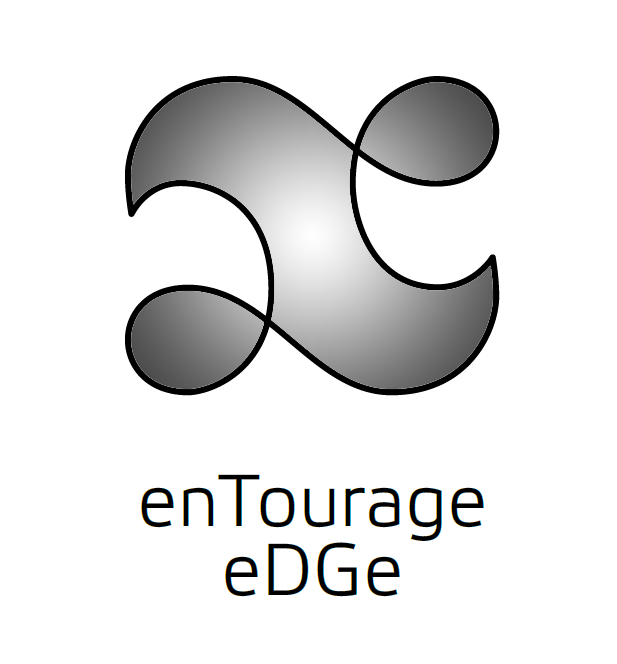

- enTourage eDGe v. 2.5
- Manufacturer: enTourage Systems, Inc.
- Type: Hybrid tablet computer, e-book
- Released: November, 2011
- Operating system: Android 2.2
- CPU: 1 GHz 32-bit Marvell PXA168
- Memory: 512 MB RAM
- Storage: (total/user-available) 4 GB/3 GB internal flash memory Formats supported: File: EPUB, PDF; Audio: MP3, WAV, 3GPP, MP4, AAC, OGG, M4A; Video: 3GP, MP4, Adobe Flash Lite (H.264)
- Display: E-paper: mono e-ink display 9.7 in diagonal 5.5 in × 8 in 825 × 1200 pixels 16-level grayscale LCD: colour TFT display 10.1 in diagonal 600 × 1024 pixels 16,777,216 colours
- Sound: 3.5 mm stereo headphone jack; built in stereo speakers
- Input: 2 full-size USB 2.0 ports; built-in microphone; 3.5 mm microphone jack
- Camera: 2 megapixels
- Connectivity: WiFi 802.11 b/g
- Power: lithium polymer battery 6 h life on LCD; 16 h life on E-Reader
- Dimensions: 10.75 × 8.25 × 1.0 in when closed
- Weight: 2.6 lb (1,200 g)

The enTourage eDGe is a dual-panel personal device, combining a tablet computer on one screen and an e-book reader on the other. Since 2011 it has been developed by Pleiades Publishing, Ltd. The device runs Google's Android OS. At present Foxconn is engaged in mass manufacturing of the enTourage eDGe v2.5. Production volume is growing in line with demand (especially in scholastics), and the device is being geared to the high requirements for modern tablets.

== Features ==
The enTourage eDGe is a dual-touchscreen device that when open looks like a book. One screen is based on e-Ink technology, and the other is a 10.1" polychromatic LCD. Both screens respond to touch, and the interactive use of a stylus. The LCD color screen is designed for multimedia display (an important advantage of the modern educational process), whereas the e-Ink screen is designed for reading and, in the corresponding mode, for taking notes, as though on paper.

The e-Ink screen used in modern e-readers works on reflected light, so is virtually harmless to the eyes, which makes it suitable for any amount of textual information. This is important for the educational process since it is possible to use electronic devices without violating health standards. Both screens are interconnected. For example, if an e-book is downloaded from the enTourage store, the book is added to the device's library and can be accessed at both the LCD and e-Ink screens. Or if a document is created on the e-Ink screen, it can be reproduced on the LCD screen.

The enTourage eDGe is equipped with a camera above the LCD screen, as well as two USB ports, which can take two flash memory drives, an external keyboard, and other compatible devices. The enTourage eDGe also comes with a stylus, which can be used for writing or interacting with both screens. Both sides of the device may be folded closed like a book, but they can also be fully folded open so that the screens are back-to-back.

== Timeline ==
- March 2010, enTourage eDGe v. 2.0 launched.
- November 2011, development of v. 2.5 begins, mass production of which starts in July 2012.
- June 2013, development of v. 4.0 begins, with launch planned for late 2014.

In a review, "Wired" magazine − The devices were marketed as enTourage eDGe – "the world’s first dualbook".

== Applications ==
In the past, the enTourage eDGe was the hardware basis for the E-OK (Electronic Educational Complex) project. E-OK's main distinguishing feature was the use of cloud technology, which ensures a full-fledged teaching-learning process, as well as additional/optional activities.

- Educational portal
- E-library
