= Vivo X Fold =

Line of Android-based foldable smartphone

Vivo X Fold Vivo X Fold+
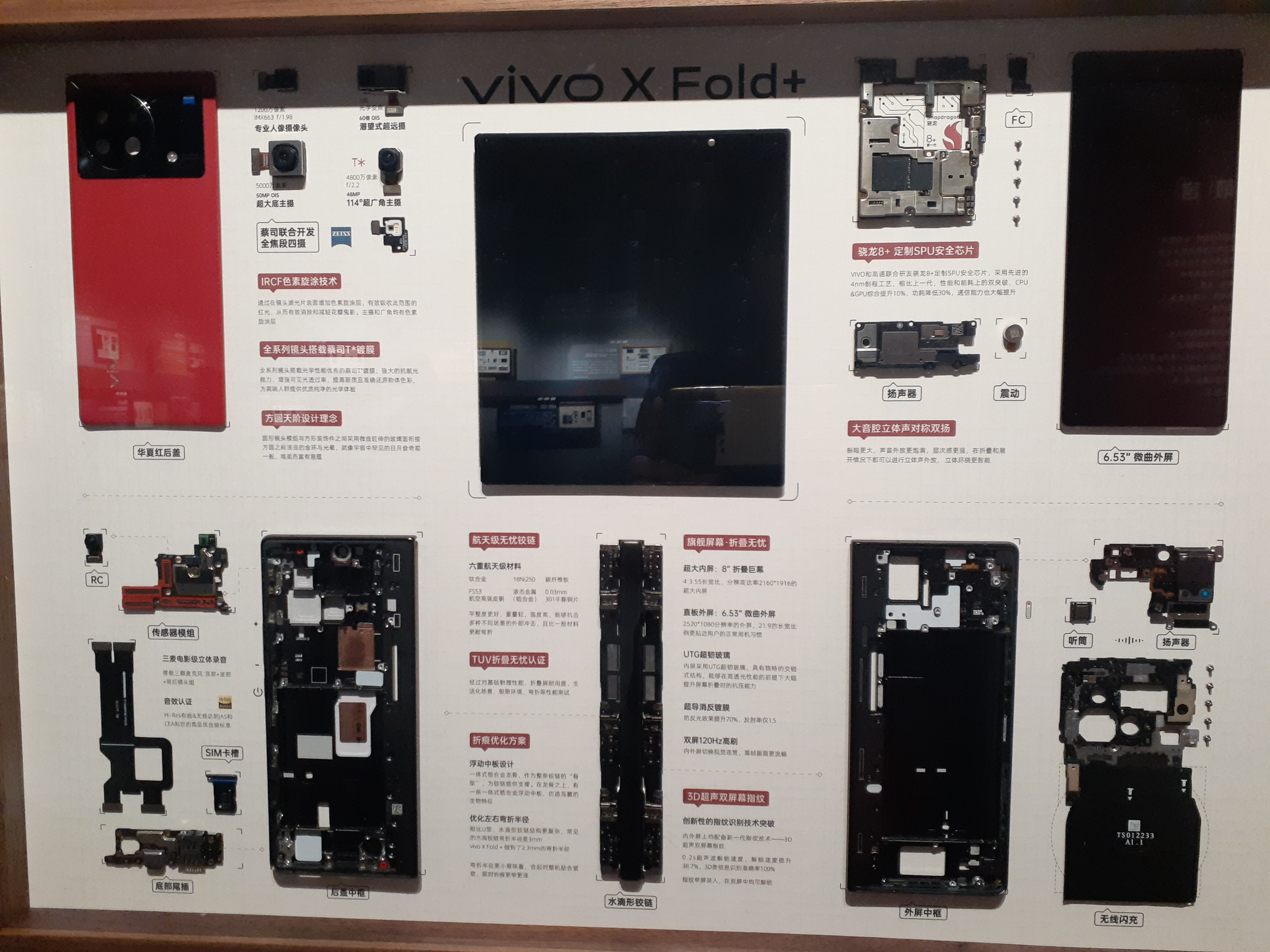
- Disassembled Vivo X Fold+
- Manufacturer: Vivo
- Type: Foldable smartphone
- Series: Vivo X series
- First released: April 11, 2022; 4 years ago
- Successor: Vivo X Fold 2
- Related: Vivo X Note
- Compatible networks: GSM / CDMA / HSPA / CDMA2000 / LTE / 5G
- Form factor: Foldable Slate
- Dimensions: Unfolded: 162 mm (6.4 in) H 144.9 mm (5.70 in) W 6.3 mm (0.25 in) D; Folded: 162 mm (6.4 in) H 74.5 mm (2.93 in) W 14.6 mm (0.57 in) D
- Weight: 311 g (11.0 oz)
- Operating system: Android 12 with Origin OS Ocean
- System-on-chip: X Fold: Qualcomm Snapdragon 8 Gen 1 (4 nm); X Fold+: Qualcomm Snapdragon 8+ Gen 1 (4 nm)
- CPU: X Fold: Octa-core (1x3.00 GHz Cortex-X2 & 3x2.50 GHz Cortex-A710 & 4x1.80 GHz Cortex-A510); X Fold+: Octa-core (1x3.19 GHz Cortex-X2 & 3x2.75 GHz Cortex-A710 & 4x1.80 GHz Cortex-A510)
- GPU: Adreno 730
- Memory: 12 GB RAM
- Storage: 256 GB, 512 GB
- Removable storage: None
- SIM: Nano-SIM
- Battery: X Fold: 4600 mAh; X Fold+: 4730 mAh
- Charging: X Fold: fast charging 66W; X Fold+: fast charging 80W; Both models: fast wirelees charging 50W, reverse wirelees charging 10W
- Rear camera: 50 MP, f/1.8, (wide), 1/1.57", 1.0 μm, Dual Pixel PDAF, Laser AF, OIS; 8 MP, f/3.4, 125mm (periscope telephoto), PDAF, OIS, 5x optical zoom 12 MP, f/2.0, 47mm (telephoto), PDAF, 2x optical zoom 48 MP, f/2.2, 14mm, 114˚ (ultrawide); Zeiss optics, Zeiss T* lens coating, Dual-LED flash, panorama 8K@30fps, 4K@30/60fps, 1080p@30/60fps, gyro-EIS
- Front camera: 16 MP, f/2.5, (wide); 1080p@30fps
- Display: 8.03 in (204 mm); 1916 x 2160 resolution (~360 ppi density); Foldable LTPO AMOLED, 120Hz refresh rate, HDR10+
- External display: 6.53 in (166 mm); 1080 x 2520 resolution, 21:9 ratio AMOLED, 120Hz refresh rate
- Sound: Stereo speakers
- Connectivity: Wi-Fi 802.11 a/b/g/n/ac/6, dual-band, Wi-Fi Direct, hotspot Bluetooth 5.2, A2DP, LE, aptX HD; A-GPS, GLONASS, BDS, GALILEO, QZSS, NavIC
- Data inputs: USB-C; Fingerprint scanner (under display, optical); Accelerometer; Gyroscope; Proximity sensor; Compass; Barometer

Vivo X Fold is an Android-based foldable smartphone developed and manufactured by Vivo. This phone announced on 11 April 2022. On 11 April 2022 was announced Vivo X Fold+ which is improved version of X Fold with more powerful GPU, bigger battery, faster charging and new red color.
