= Windows 11 =

2021 Microsoft operating system version

- Version of the Windows NT operating system

- Screenshot of Windows 11, showing the Start menu and centered taskbar, with the Search box open
- Developer: Microsoft
- Written in: C, C++, C#, Rust, Assembly
- OS family: Microsoft Windows
- Working state: Current
- Source model: Closed-source; Source-available (through Shared Source Initiative)
- Released to manufacturing: June 24, 2021; 5 years ago
- General availability: October 5, 2021; 5 years ago
- Latest release: 26H1 (10.0.28000.3501) (November 10, 2026; 7 days ago) [±] 26H2 (10.0.26300.9974) (November 10, 2026; 7 days ago) [±]
- Latest preview: Release Preview: 26H2 (10.0.26300.9974) (November 10, 2026; 7 days ago) [±]; Release Preview (26H1): (10.0.28000.3501) (November 10, 2026; 7 days ago) [±]; Beta: 26H2 (10.0.26320.9876) (November 6, 2026; 11 days ago) [±]; Beta (26H1): (10.0.28020.3445) (November 6, 2026; 11 days ago) [±]; Experimental: 26H2 (10.0.26340.9882) (November 6, 2026; 11 days ago) [±]; Experimental (26H1): (10.0.28120.3454) (November 6, 2026; 11 days ago) [±]; Experimental (Future Platforms): (10.0.29704.1000) (November 6, 2026; 11 days ago) [±]
- Marketing target: Personal computing
- Available in: 88 languages
- List of languages: Afrikaans - Afrikaans; Azərbaycanca - Azerbaijani; Bosanski - Bosnian; Català (Espanya, valencià) - Catalan (Spain, Valencian); Català (Espanya) - Catalan (Spain); Čeština - Czech; Cymraeg - Welsh; Dansk - Danish; Deutsch - German; Eesti - Estonian; English (United Kingdom) - English (United Kingdom); English (United States) - English (United States); Español (España) - Spanish (Spain); Español (México) - Spanish (Mexico); Euskara - Basque; Filipino - Filipino; Français (Canada) - French (Canada); Français (France) - French (France); Gaeilge - Irish; Gàidhlig - Scottish Gaelic; Galego - Galician; Hrvatski - Croatian; Indonesia - Indonesian; Íslenska - Icelandic; Italiano - Italian; Latviešu - Latvian; Lëtzebuergesch - Luxembourgish; Lietuvių - Lithuanian; Magyar - Hungarian; Malti - Maltese; Māori - Maori; Melayu - Malay; Nederlands - Dutch; Norsk bokmål - Norwegian Bokmål; Norsk nynorsk - Norwegian Nynorsk; O‘zbek - Uzbek; Polski - Polish; Português (Brasil) - Portuguese (Brazil); Português (Portugal) - Portuguese (Portugal); Română - Romanian; Runasimi - Quechua; Shqip - Albanian; Slovenčina - Slovak; Slovenščina - Slovenian; Srpski - Serbian (Latin); Suomi - Finnish; Svenska - Swedish; Tiếng Việt - Vietnamese; Türkçe - Turkish; Ελληνικά - Greek; Беларуская - Belarusian; Български - Bulgarian; Қазақша - Kazakh; Македонски - Macedonian; Русский - Russian; Српски (ћирилица, Босна и Херцеговина) - Serbian (Cyrillic, Bosnia & Herzegovina); Српски (ћирилица, Србија) - Serbian (Cyrillic, Serbia); Српски (ћирилица, Црна Гора) - Serbian (Cyrillic, Montenegro); Татар - Tatar; Українська - Ukrainian; ქართული - Georgian; Հայերեն - Armenian; עברית - Hebrew; ئۇيغۇرچە - Uyghur; اردو - Urdu; العربية - Arabic; فارسی - Persian; አማርኛ - Amharic; कोंकणी - Konkani; नेपाली - Nepali; मराठी - Marathi; हिन्दी - Hindi; অসমীয়া - Assamese; বাংলা - Bangla; ਪੰਜਾਬੀ - Punjabi; ગુજરાતી - Gujarati; ଓଡ଼ିଆ - Odia; தமிழ் - Tamil; తెలుగు - Telugu; ಕನ್ನಡ - Kannada; മലയാളം - Malayalam; ไทย - Thai; ລາວ - Lao; ខ្មែរ - Khmer; ᏣᎳᎩ - Cherokee; 한국어 - Korean; 中文 (简体) - Chinese (Simplified); 中文 (繁體) - Chinese (Traditional); 日本語 - Japanese
- Update method: Windows Update
- Package manager: .exe, appx, appxbundle, WinGet
- Supported platforms: x86-64, ARM64
- Kernel type: Hybrid (Windows NT kernel)
- Userland: Native API; Windows API.NET Framework; Universal Windows Platform; WebView2; WinUI; Windows Subsystem for Linux
- Default user interface: Windows shell (graphical)
- License: Proprietary commercial software
- Preceded by: Windows 10 (2015)
- Official website: Windows 11

Support status
- Supported; See § Updates and support for more details.

Windows 11 is the current major release of Microsoft's Windows NT operating system, released on October 5, 2021, as the successor to Windows 10. It is available as a free upgrade for devices running Windows 10 that meet its system requirements. The Windows Server counterpart, Windows Server 2025, was released three years later. It is the first major version of Windows without a corresponding mobile edition, following the end of support for Windows 10 Mobile, and is implemented to mobile devices with different form factors, screen sizes and CPU architectures (including tablets and handheld game consoles with smaller screen sizes) as a unified edition of Windows. As of today, it is now the only fully supported consumer-oriented version of Windows.

The operating system introduced a redesigned Windows shell influenced by elements of the canceled Windows 10X project, including a centered Start menu, a separate "Widgets" panel replacing live tiles, and new window management features. It also incorporates gaming technologies from the Xbox Series X and Series S, such as Auto HDR and DirectStorage on supported hardware. The Chromium-based Microsoft Edge remains the default web browser, replacing Internet Explorer, while Microsoft Teams is integrated into the interface. Microsoft also expanded support for third-party applications in the Microsoft Store, including limited compatibility with Android apps through a partnership with the Amazon Appstore.

Windows 11 introduced significantly higher system requirements than typical operating system upgrades, which Microsoft attributed to security considerations. The operating system requires features such as UEFI, Secure Boot, and Trusted Platform Module (TPM) version 2.0. Official support is limited to devices with an eighth-generation Intel Core or newer processor, a second-generation AMD Ryzen or newer processor, or a Qualcomm Snapdragon 850 or later system-on-chip. These restrictions exclude a substantial number of systems, prompting criticism from users and media. While installation on unsupported hardware is technically possible, Microsoft does not guarantee access to updates or support. It is the first version of Windows without a 32-bit build, running only on x86-64 and ARM64 architectures; despite this, it is still able to run 32-bit applications through the WoW64 subsystem, which 64-bit versions of Windows have been using since Windows XP.

Windows 11 received mixed reviews upon its release. Prelaunch discussion focused on its increased hardware requirements, with debate over whether these changes were primarily motivated by security improvements or to encourage users to purchase newer devices. The operating system was generally praised for its updated visual design, improved window management, and enhanced security features. However, critics pointed to changes in the user interface, such as limitations on taskbar customization and difficulties in changing default applications, as steps back from Windows 10. In June 2025, Windows 11 surpassed Windows 10 as the most installed version of Windows worldwide. As of October 2026, Windows 11 is the most used version of Windows, accounting for 74% of the worldwide market share, while its predecessor Windows 10 holds 25%, and Windows 7 holds less than 1%. Windows 11 is the most-used traditional PC operating system, with a 38% share of users.

== Development ==
At the 2015 Ignite conference, Microsoft employee Jerry Nixon stated that Windows 10 would be the "last version of Windows". The operating system was considered to be a service, with new builds and updates to be released over time. PC World argued that the widely reported comment was, however, taken out of context, noting that the official event transcript marks it only as a segue rather than a core part of the talk. It argues that Nixon was referring to the fact that he could talk freely at the event because 10 was the last version in current development.

In October 2019, Microsoft announced "Windows 10X", a future edition of Windows 10 designed exclusively for dual-touchscreen devices such as the then-upcoming Surface Neo. It featured a modified user interface designed around context-sensitive "postures" for different screen configurations and usage scenarios, and changes such as a centered taskbar and updated Start menu without Windows 10's "live tiles". Legacy Windows applications would also be required to run in "containers" to ensure performance and power optimization. Microsoft stated that it planned to release Windows 10X devices by the end of 2020.

In May 2020, during the COVID-19 pandemic, Panos Panay, Microsoft's chief product officer for Microsoft Windows and Microsoft Office, stated that "as we continue to put customers' needs at the forefront, we need to focus on meeting customers where they are now", and announced that Windows 10X would only launch on single-screen devices at first, and that Microsoft would "continue to look for the right moment, in conjunction with our OEM partners, to bring dual-screen devices to market".

In October 2020, reports emerged that Microsoft was working on a user interface refresh for Windows 10 codenamed "Sun Valley", scheduled to be included in a late-2021 feature update codenamed "Cobalt". Internal documentation stated that the aim for "Sun Valley" was to "reinvigorat[e]" the Windows user interface and make it more "fluid", with a more consistent application of WinUI, while reports suggested Microsoft planned to adapt UI elements seen in Windows 10X. In January 2021, it was reported that a job listing referring to a "sweeping visual rejuvenation of Windows" had been posted by Microsoft.

By December 2020, Microsoft had begun to implement and announce some of these visual changes and other new features on Windows 10 Insider Preview builds, such as new system icons (which also included the replacement of shell resources dating back as far as Windows 95), improvements to Task View to allow changing the wallpaper on each virtual desktop, x86-64 emulation on ARM, and adding the Auto HDR feature from Xbox Series X.

On May 18, 2021, Head of Windows Servicing and Delivery John Cable stated that Windows 10X had been canceled and that Microsoft would be "accelerating the integration of key foundational 10X technology into other parts of Windows and products at the company".

=== Announcement ===
At the Microsoft Build 2021 developer conference, CEO and chairman Satya Nadella teased about the existence of the next generation of Windows during his keynote speech. According to Nadella, he had been self-hosting it for several months. He also teased that an official announcement would come very soon. Just a week after Nadella's keynote, Microsoft started sending invitations for a dedicated Windows media event at 11:00 a.m. ET on June 24, 2021. Microsoft also posted an 11-minute video of Windows start-up sounds to YouTube on June 10, 2021, with many people speculating both the time of the Microsoft event and the duration of the Windows start-up sound video to be a reference to the name of the operating system as Windows 11.

On June 24, 2021, Windows 11 was officially announced at a virtual event hosted by Chief Product Officer Panos Panay. According to Nadella, Windows 11 is "a re-imagining of the operating system". Further details for developers such as updates to the Microsoft Store, the new Windows App SDK (code-named "Project Reunion"), new Fluent Design guidelines, and more were discussed during another developer-focused event on the same day.

=== Release and marketing ===
The Windows 11 name was accidentally released in an official Microsoft support document in June 2021. Leaked images of a purported beta build of Windows 11's desktop surfaced online later on June 15, 2021, which were followed by a leak of the aforementioned build on the same day. The screenshots and leaked build show an interface resembling that of the canceled Windows 10X, alongside a redesigned out-of-box experience (OOBE) and Windows 11 branding. Microsoft would later confirm the authenticity of the leaked beta, with Panay stating that it was an "early weird build".

At the June 24 media event, Microsoft also announced that Windows 11 would be released in "Holiday 2021". Its release will be accompanied by a free upgrade for compatible Windows 10 devices through Windows Update. On June 28, Microsoft announced the release of the first preview build and SDK of Windows 11 to Windows Insiders.

On August 31, 2021, Microsoft announced that Windows 11 was to be released on October 5, 2021. The release would be phased, with newer eligible devices to be offered the upgrade first. Since its predecessor Windows 10 was released on July 29, 2015, more than six years earlier, this is the longest time span between successive releases of Microsoft Windows operating systems, beating the time between Windows XP (released on October 25, 2001) and Windows Vista (released on January 30, 2007).

The first television commercial for Windows 11 premiered during the 2021 NFL Kickoff Game on September 9, 2021; it was intended to showcase a "feeling of immersion and fluidity", with imagery of operating system features and Xbox Game Studios' Halo Infinite. Other promotional campaigns on release day included the Burj Khalifa in Dubai being illuminated with imagery of the Windows 11 logo and default "Bloom" wallpaper (created by Barcelona-based art studio Six N. Five), and Mikey Likes It ice cream parlors in New York City distributing free cups of "Bloomberry" ice cream.

Though a support document listed October 4, 2021, as the initial release date, Microsoft officially released Windows 11 on October 5, 2021, as an opt-in, in-place upgrade through either the Windows 11 Installation Assistant application (which can perform the upgrade, or generate an ISO image or USB install media), or via Windows Update in a phased rollout; Microsoft anticipated that Windows 11 would be available via Windows Update to all eligible devices by mid-2022. New installations of Windows 10 on eligible hardware may present an option to upgrade during the OOBE. Retail copies of Windows 11 (consisting of a license key and USB flash drive) were released on May 9, 2022, and digital licenses became available via Microsoft Store on July 28, 2022. On September 20, 2023, around two years after the release date of Windows 11, Microsoft announced that users would no longer be able to use Windows 7 or Windows 8/8.1 product keys to activate Windows 10/11. As of 2024, however, some reports indicate that they still work, under certain conditions.

== Features ==
Windows 11, the first major Windows release since 2015, builds upon its predecessor by revamping the user interface to follow Microsoft's new Fluent Design guidelines. The redesign, which focuses on ease of use and flexibility, comes alongside new productivity and social features and updates to security and accessibility, addressing some of the deficiencies of Windows 10.

The Microsoft Store, which serves as a unified storefront for apps and other content, is also redesigned in Windows 11. Microsoft now allows developers to distribute Win32, progressive web applications, and other packaging technologies in the Microsoft Store, alongside Universal Windows Platform apps. Microsoft also announced plans to allow third-party application stores (such as Epic Games Store) to distribute their clients on Microsoft Store. Windows 11 supports x86-64 software emulation on ARM-based platforms.

The collaboration platform Microsoft Teams is integrated into the Windows 11 user interface, and is accessible via the taskbar. Skype will no longer be bundled with the OS by default. In early 2023, the Phone Link app gained limited support for iMessage.

Microsoft claims performance improvements such as smaller update sizes, faster web browsing in "any browser", faster wake time from sleep mode, and faster Windows Hello authentication.

Windows 11 ships with the Chromium-based Microsoft Edge web browser (for compatibility with Google Chrome web browser), and does not include or support Internet Explorer. Its rendering engine MSHTML (Trident) is still included with the operating system for backwards compatibility reasons, and Edge can be configured with Group Policy to render whitelisted websites in "IE Mode" (which still uses IE's rendering engine MSHTML, instead of Blink layout engine). Windows 11 is the first version of Windows since the original retail release of Windows 95 to not ship with Internet Explorer. To comply with the Digital Markets Act, Microsoft is allowing users in the European Economic Area to remove the Microsoft Edge browser, Microsoft Bing search engine, and advertisements to comply with users' interests.

The updated Xbox app, along with the Auto HDR and DirectStorage technologies introduced by the Xbox Series X and Series S, were integrated into Windows 11; the latter requiring a graphics card supporting DirectX 12 and an NVMe solid-state drive.

=== User interface ===
A redesigned user interface is present frequently throughout the operating system, building upon the Fluent Design System; translucency, shadows, a new color palette, and a rounded geometry are prevalent throughout the UI. A prevalent aspect of the design is an appearance known as "Mica", described as an "opaque, dynamic material that incorporates theme and desktop wallpaper to paint the background of long-lived windows such as apps and settings". Much of the interface and start menu takes heavy inspiration from the now-canceled Windows 10X. The Segoe UI font used since Windows Vista has been updated to a variable version, improving its ability to scale between different display resolutions.

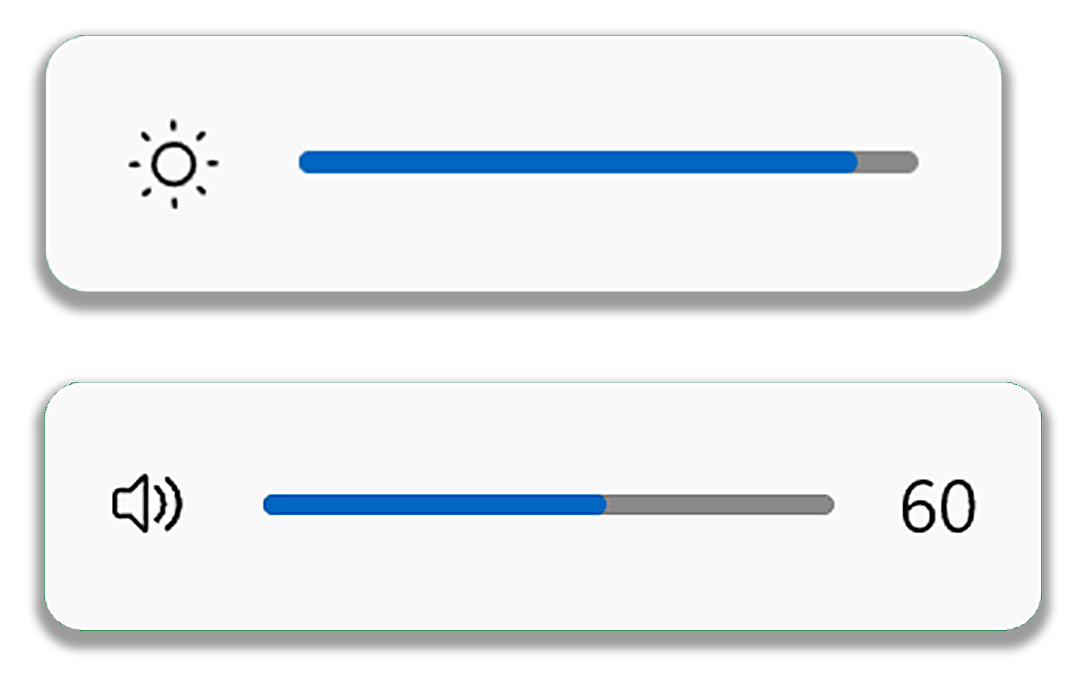
The flyout for the volume and brightness control in Windows 11 version 22H2 onwards

The taskbar's buttons are center-aligned by default, and it is permanently pinned to the bottom edge of the screen; prior to version 26H2, it cannot be moved to the top, left, or right edges of the screen as in previous versions of Windows without manual changes to the registry. The notifications sidebar is now accessed by clicking the date and time, with other Quick Actions toggles, as well as volume, brightness, and media playback controls, moved to a new settings pop-up displayed by clicking on the system tray. The "Widgets" button on the taskbar displays a panel with Microsoft Start, a news aggregator with personalized stories and content (expanding upon the "news and interests" panel introduced in later builds of Windows 10). Microsoft Teams is similarly integrated with the taskbar, with a pop-up showing a list of recent conversations.

The Start menu has been significantly redesigned, replacing the "live tiles" used by Windows 8.x and 10 with a grid of "pinned" applications, and a list of recent applications and documents. File Explorer was updated to replace its ribbon toolbar with a more traditional toolbar, while its context menus have been redesigned to move some tasks (such as copy and paste) to a toolbar along the top of the menu, and hide other operations under an overflow menu.

The redesigned Task View in Windows 11, featuring a separate wallpaper support for individual desktops

Task View, a feature introduced in Windows 10, features a refreshed design, and supports giving separate wallpapers to each virtual desktop. The window snapping functionality has been enhanced with two additional features; hovering over a window's maximize button displays predetermined "Snap Layouts" for tiling multiple windows onto a display, and tiled arrangement of windows can be minimized and restored from the taskbar as a "snap group". When a display is disconnected in a multi-monitor configuration, the windows that were previously on that display will be minimized rather than automatically moved to the main display. If the same display is reconnected, the windows are restored to their prior location.

In June 2025, Microsoft unveiled Xbox mode, a new interface designed primarily for handheld gaming PCs; similarly to SteamOS, it boots directly into the Xbox app and bypasses the Windows desktop entirely, reducing resource consumption and providing a more console-like interface. The task switcher and lock screen also have optimizations for gamepad input. The new mode was a timed exclusive to the ROG Xbox Ally, and become generally available in April 2026 in selected territories.

=== Windows Subsystem for Android ===
On October 21, 2021, Windows Subsystem for Android (WSA) became available to Beta channel builds of Windows 11 for users in the United States, which allowed users to install and run Android apps on their devices. Users could install Android apps through any source using the APK file format. An Amazon Appstore client for Microsoft Store was also available. The Windows Subsystem for Android and Amazon Appstore became available to Release channel users in the United States on February 15, 2022, in Windows 11 Release build 22000.527. On March 5, 2024, Microsoft announced deprecation of WSA with support ending on March 5, 2025.

WSA was based on the Intel Bridge runtime compiler; Intel stated that the technology was not dependent on its CPUs, and would also be supported on x86-64 and ARM CPUs from other vendors.

=== Setup ===
Home and Pro (since version 22H2) edition installation requires internet connection and Microsoft account login (only if for personal use on Pro) is mandatory unless manually bypassed to create a local user. However, Microsoft has since blocked one of the last remaining easy bypass methods that allowed local account creation during initial setup, complicating the bypass process further. All other editions are excluded from this requirement.

=== System security ===
As part of the minimum system requirements, Windows 11 only runs on devices with a Trusted Platform Module 2.0 security coprocessor, albeit with some exceptions, see § System requirements for details. According to Microsoft, the TPM 2.0 coprocessor is a "critical building block" for protection against firmware and hardware attacks. In addition, Microsoft now requires devices with Windows 11 to include virtualization-based security (VBS), hypervisor-protected code integrity (HVCI), and Secure Boot built-in and enabled by default. The operating system also features hardware-enforced stack protection for supported Intel and AMD processors for protection against zero-day exploits.

Like its predecessor, Windows 11 also supports multi-factor authentication and biometric authentication through Windows Hello.

=== Artificial intelligence ===
In subsequent updates, Microsoft added several features based on artificial intelligence (AI), like live captions, background noise removal in videoconferencing, webcam auto-framing that follows the user's movements, and AI-powered Bing Chat in the taskbar's search field. Following the integration of GPT-4 in Microsoft's other products, the company announced that by summer 2023, the newly released Microsoft Copilot would add GPT-4 integration to the Windows taskbar.

On May 20, 2024, Microsoft officially announced Recall, a feature that uses a hardware AI accelerator to locally store snapshots of the user's activity (including content transcribed using live captions), and which allows users to search through them. This feature is exclusive to devices certified under the "Copilot+ PC" branding. Following concerns over the security implications of Recall, Microsoft announced in June 2024 that it would delay the release of the feature to allow for testing and feedback via the Windows Insider program. In July 2025, Microsoft released Copilot Vision, a tool which scans a user's screen and uses Copilot to analyze the contents. In March 2026, Microsoft indicated in a blog post that they would reduce "unnecessary" presence of Copilot in certain basic apps.

== Editions ==
Windows 11 is available in two main editions; the Home edition, which is intended for consumer users, and the Pro edition, which contains additional networking and security features (such as BitLocker), as well as the ability to join a domain. Windows 11 Home may be restricted by default to verified software obtained from Microsoft Store ("S Mode"). Windows 11 Home requires an Internet connection and a Microsoft account in order to complete first-time setup. This restriction is also applied to Windows 11 Pro since version 22H2 as it was announced in February 2022, although a Microsoft account is not required if it is not for personal use.

Windows 11 SE was announced on November 9, 2021, as an edition exclusively for low-end devices sold in the education market; it is intended as a successor to Windows 10 S, and also competes primarily with ChromeOS. It is designed to be managed via Microsoft Intune. Based on feedback from educators, Windows 11 SE has multiple UI differences and limitations, including Snap Layouts not containing layouts for more than two applications at once, all applications opening maximized by default, and Widgets being removed. It is bundled with applications such as Microsoft Office for Microsoft 365, Minecraft Education Edition, and Flipgrid, while OneDrive is used to save files by default. Windows 11 SE does not include Microsoft Store; third-party software is provisioned or installed by administrators. To target organizations migrating from Google Chrome, Microsoft Edge is configured by default to enable the installation of extensions from the Chrome Web Store. In July 2025, Microsoft announced that it will drop support for Windows 11 SE in October 2026 after the 2024 Update.

=== Other editions ===
Other editions include Pro Education, Pro for Workstations, Education, Enterprise, Enterprise multi-session, IoT Enterprise, Enterprise LTSC, IoT Enterprise LTSC, Home Single Language, and Team; along with regional variations. These editions remain fundamentally the same as their Windows 10 edition counterparts.

Two new edition variants called IoT Enterprise Subscription and IoT Enterprise Subscription LTSC have been introduced in version 24H2.

As with other versions of Windows since Windows XP, Microsoft has also distributed special editions of Windows 11 designated as "N" and "KN" to comply with the antitrust laws within the European Union and South Korea respectively. These editions removed the built-in Media Players but users have encouraged to download the third party media software; DirectX components such as DXVA and Media Foundation still reserved.

== Supported languages ==
Before the launch of Windows 11, OEMs (as well as mobile operators) and businesses were offered two options for device imaging: Component-Based Servicing lp.cab files (for the languages to be preloaded on the first boot) and Local Experience Pack .appx files (for the languages available for download on supported PCs). The 38 fully-localized Language Pack (LP) languages were available as both lp.cab and .appx packages, while the remaining 72 partially-localized Language Interface Pack (LIP) languages were only available as .appx packages.

With Windows 11, that process has changed. Five new LP languages were added — Catalan, Basque, Galician, Indonesian, and Vietnamese — bringing the total number of LP languages to 43. Furthermore, these 43 languages can only be imaged using lp.cab packages. This is to ensure a fully supported language-imaging and cumulative update experience.

The remaining 67 LIP languages that are LXP-based will move to a self-service model, and can only be added by Windows users themselves via the Microsoft Store and Windows Settings apps, not during the Windows imaging process. Any user, not just admins, can now add both the display language and its features, which can help users in business environments, but these exact language options for LPs and LIPs (available from the start or available as optional downloads) still depend on the PC manufacturer and market of purchase (as well as the mobile operator for PCs that support cellular connectivity), like with older Windows versions since Windows Phone 7.

== Updates and support ==
Like Windows 10, Windows 11 follows Microsoft's Modern Lifecycle Policy. Each annual feature update has its own support lifecycle: two years for the Home and Pro editions, and three years for the Education and Enterprise editions. Microsoft has stated that Windows 11 provides no lifecycle guarantee if it has been installed on a machine that does not meet its minimum hardware requirements.

Windows 11 receives annual major updates, though Microsoft sometimes adds major features in mid-cycle releases. Starting in 2022, in the Enterprise and Education editions, major features added in yearly releases will be turned off by default until the next yearly release, though these features can be manually enabled as a group policy.

=== Preview releases ===
The Windows Insider program carries over from Windows 10, with prerelease builds divided into "Dev" (unstable builds used to test features for future feature updates), "Beta" (test builds for the next feature update; relatively stable in comparison to Dev channel), and "Release Preview" (prerelease builds for final testing of upcoming feature updates) channels.

=== Versions ===
Overview of Windows 11 versions
Name	Version	Codename	Build	CPU μarch	Release date	End of support by edition			
Name	Version	Codename	Build	CPU μarch	Release date	GAC		LTSC	
Name	Version	Codename	Build	CPU μarch	Release date	Home, Pro, SE, Pro Education, Pro for Workstations	Education, Enterprise, IoT Enterprise	Mainstream	Extended
Windows 11	21H2	Sun Valley	22000	x64, ARM	October 5, 2021	October 10, 2023	October 8, 2024	—N/a	
Windows 11 2022 Update	22H2	Sun Valley 2	22621	x64, ARM	September 20, 2022	October 8, 2024	October 14, 2025	—N/a	
Windows 11 2023 Update	23H2	Sun Valley 3	22631	x64, ARM	October 31, 2023	November 11, 2025	November 10, 2026	—N/a	
Windows 11 2024 Update	24H2	Hudson Valley	26100	x64, ARM	October 1, 2024 (Note: Generally available for Copilot+ PCs from June 15, 2024.)	October 13, 2026	October 12, 2027	October 9, 2029	October 10, 2034
Windows 11 2025 Update	25H2	—N/a	26200	x64, ARM	September 30, 2025	October 12, 2027	October 10, 2028	—N/a	
Windows 11, version 26H1 (Note: Only available to devices with certain ARM processors.)	26H1	—N/a	28000	ARM	February 10, 2026	March 14, 2028	March 13, 2029	—N/a	
Windows 11 2026 Update	26H2	—N/a	26300	x64, ARM	September 29, 2026	October 10, 2028	October 9, 2029	—N/a	
Legend: Unsupported Supported Latest version Preview version

=== Known issues ===
Version 24H2, notably, has a longer than usual list of known issues. Some require updated drivers or (free) software updates to fix, while others have yet to be fixed as of March 2025. E.g., broken biometrics and camera support on a limited number of devices, and some older games and applications not functioning properly or not working at all; e.g., Asphalt 8 and Dirac audio improvement software (if cridspapo.dll is utilized).

On August 11, 2026, Windows 11 launched security update KB5121003. This update, while fixing hundreds of known vulnerabilities, also made the OS vulnerable to crashing. Known issues include system crashes, errors when logging in, drivers not operating as intended, and issues with games with specific drivers (ARC Raiders and The Finals are particularly of note) causing the entire computer to crash.

== System requirements ==
Hardware requirements for Windows 11 (excludes IoT Enterprise editions)
Component	Minimum
Processor	A compatible 64-bit processor (x86-64 or ARM64) with at least 1 GHz clock rate and at least 2 processor cores (Note: Processor must either appear on one of the official Windows 11 lists of approved processors, or have its compatibility verified via the Microsoft PC Health Check app to be considered officially supported, and thus be entitled to receive updates.)
Memory (RAM)	At least 4 GB
Storage space	At least 64 GB
System firmware	Unified Extensible Firmware Interface (UEFI)
Security	Secure Boot (recommended and required to be available, but does not need to be enabled)
Security	Trusted Platform Module (TPM) version 2.0
Graphics card	Compatible with DirectX 12 or later with WDDM 2.0 driver
Display	High definition (720p) display that is greater than 9" diagonally, 8 bits per color channel (Note: Optional on IoT Enterprise editions)
Internet connection and Microsoft accounts	Internet connection and Microsoft account required to complete first-time setup on Home and Pro (for personal use) editions.
Optical disc drive for its installer	Any optical disc drive capable of reading DVD-ROM DL (Double layer DVD-ROM) media.
External storage for its installer	Any external storage with at least 8 GB.

Additional requirements for optional functionality
Feature	Requirements
5G support	5G-capable modem
Auto HDR	HDR-capable monitor
Biometric authentication and Windows Hello	Illuminated infrared camera or fingerprint reader
BitLocker to Go	USB flash drive (available in Windows 11 Pro and higher editions)
Hyper-V	Second Level Address Translation (SLAT) (available in Windows 11 Pro and higher editions)
DirectStorage	NVMe Solid-state drive
DirectX 12 Ultimate	Available with supported games and graphics cards
Spatial sound	Supporting hardware and software
Two-factor authentication	Use of PIN, biometric authentication, or a phone with Wi-Fi or Bluetooth capabilities
Speech recognition	Microphone
Wi-Fi 6E support	New WLAN IHV hardware and driver, Wi-Fi 6E-capable AP/router
Windows Projection	Wi-Fi adapter that supports Wi-Fi Direct, WDDM 2.0

=== Official ===
The basic system requirements of Windows 11 differ significantly from Windows 10. Windows 11 only supports 64-bit systems such as those using an x86-64 or ARM64 processor; IA-32 and ARM32 processors are no longer supported. Thus, Windows 11 is the first consumer version of Windows without 32-bit processors (although Windows Server 2008 R2 is the first version of Windows Server without them). The minimum RAM and storage requirements were also increased; Windows 11 now requires at least 4 GB of RAM and 64 GB of storage. Also for the first time, TPM 2.0 is now required, however, Original equipment manufacturers (OEM) can still ship computers without TPM 2.0 enabled upon Microsoft's approval. S mode is only supported for the Home edition of Windows 11.

In addition, for the first time, Microsoft enforces a processor model check before installation (although not on all editions, e.g., some IoT editions are excluded), where the processor model is checked against a Microsoft whitelist. As of March 2025, the officially supported lists of processors includes eighth generation Intel Core CPUs (Coffee Lake) and later, AMD Zen+ CPUs/APUs and later (which include the "AF" revisions of Ryzen 1000 CPUs, which are underclocked Zen+ CPUs that supplant Ryzen 1000 parts that could no longer be manufactured due to a change in process), and Qualcomm Snapdragon 850 and later. The Intel compatibility list also includes the Intel Core i7-7820HQ, a seventh-generation processor used by the Surface Studio 2, although only on devices that shipped with DCH-based drivers.

The processor compatibility lists Microsoft provides are cumulative, e.g., all processors listed as compatible with version 21H2 are also compatible with version 24H2. However, newer version lists (post version 21H2) may omit older processor models, as these lists are primarily intended for use by OEMs, for newly manufactured devices. Regardless, as of February 2025, Microsoft now recommends that consumers simply ignore these lists and instead verify processor compatibility via the Microsoft PC Health Check app. This change was due to previous consumer confusion, initially perpetuated by erroneous reports from some news outlets.

On May 20, 2024, Microsoft announced "Copilot+ PC"—a brand of Windows 11 devices that are designed to support enhanced artificial intelligence features. Copilot+ PCs require an on-board AI accelerator, at least 256 GB of storage, and at least 16 GB of RAM. The first wave of Copilot+ PCs run the Qualcomm Snapdragon X Elite system-on-chip. x86-64-based Copilot+ PCs began to be announced later in the year, which are based on AMD Ryzen AI and Intel Core Ultra CPUs.

=== Unofficial ===
Devices with unsupported 64-bit processors are not blocked from installing or running Windows 11; however, a clean install or upgrade using ISO installation media must be performed as Windows Update will not offer an upgrade from Windows 10. Additionally, users must also accept an on-screen disclaimer stating that they will not be entitled to receive updates, and that damage caused by using Windows 11 on an unsupported configuration are not covered by the manufacturer's warranty.

In addition, various unofficial methods to bypass other Windows 11 official requirements, such as, but not limited to, TPM 2.0 exist; furthermore there also exists an official bypass method provided directly by Microsoft (whereas the installation itself remains unofficially supported).

In April 2024, Windows Insider version 24H2 builds began to have a dependency of the SSE4.2 and POPCNT CPU instructions (corresponding to the x86-64 v2 microarchitecture level), increasing the unofficial minimum compatibility to Bulldozer microarchitecture-based processors like the AMD FX (2011) processors and first-generation Intel Core i (2008) processors. Intel Core 2 (like the Core 2 Duo and Core 2 Quad), AMD K10 CPUs (such as Phenom II and Athlon II) and older are no longer supported. Finally, version 24H2 now requires ARMv8.1, dropping unofficial support for ARMv8.0, e.g., the Snapdragon 835 and older are no longer supported.

Independent testing has showed that RAM should be more than 8GB as Windows 11 does not work well with 8GB of RAM or less.

=== Firmware compatibility ===
Legacy BIOS is no longer officially supported; a UEFI system and a Trusted Platform Module (TPM) 2.0 security coprocessor is now officially required. The TPM requirement in particular has led to confusion as many motherboards do not have TPM support, or require a compatible TPM to be physically installed onto the motherboard. Many newer CPUs also include a TPM implemented at the CPU level (with AMD referring to this as "fTPM", and Intel referring to it as "Platform Trust Technology" [PTT]), which might be disabled by default and require changing settings in the computer's UEFI firmware, or a UEFI firmware update that changes the default settings to reflect these requirements.

ARM64 version of Windows 11 requires the UEFI firmware with ACPI protocol.

Starting with version 24H2, IoT Enterprise editions have officially reintroduced legacy BIOS support and eliminated the requirement for a TPM.

=== Third-party software ===
Some third-party software may refuse to run on configurations of Windows 11 that do not comply with the hardware security requirement. After the release of Windows 11, Riot Games' kernel-level anti-cheat system Vanguard—used in Valorant and since May 2024 by League of Legends—began to enforce the operating system security requirements, and will not allow the games to be run on the OS if secure boot and a TPM 2.0-compliant coprocessor are not enabled.

=== IoT Enterprise editions ===
Hardware requirements for Windows 11 IoT Enterprise editions
Component	Minimum
Processor	A 64-bit processor (x86-64 v2 or ARMv8.1) with at least 1 GHz clock rate and at least 2 processor cores.
Memory (RAM)	LTSC: At least 2 GB; Non-LTSC: At least 4 GB
Storage space	LTSC: At least 16 GB; Non-LTSC: At least 64 GB
System firmware	Basic Input/Output System (BIOS)
Security	Optional
Graphics card	Compatible with DirectX 10/Not required
Display	Optional
Internet connection and Microsoft accounts	Not required

While IoT Enterprise editions have always had slightly reduced official requirements compared to other Windows 11 editions, notably starting with version 24H2, minimum requirements were further reduced and now differ significantly. These updated 24H2 requirements were announced on May 22, 2024, for both LTSC and non-LTSC editions.

For the first time since Windows 11 release, Microsoft has officially eliminated a TPM and UEFI minimum requirement for all systems running these editions and dropped the minimum DirectX version down to 10 (version 12 was previously required on 23H2). Finally, the IoT Enterprise LTSC edition further drops the minimum required RAM to 2 GB and storage space to 16 GB.

== Tracking ==
Microsoft Windows 11 uses a persistent device identifier for tracking and diagnostic purposes.

== Reception ==
=== Prerelease ===
Reception of Windows 11 upon its reveal was positive, with critics praising the new design and productivity features. However, Microsoft was criticized for creating confusion over the minimum system requirements for Windows 11. The increased system requirements (compared to those of Windows 10) initially published by Microsoft meant that up to 60% of existing Windows 10 PCs were unable to upgrade to Windows 11, which has faced concerns that this will contribute to electronic waste.

Microsoft has not specifically acknowledged this when discussing the cutoff, it was also acknowledged that the sixth and seventh generation of Intel Core processors were prominently afflicted by CPU-level security vulnerabilities such as Meltdown and Spectre, and that newer CPUs manufactured since then had increased mitigations against the flaws.

Speaking to IT news outlet CRN, a dozen solution providers all felt that they "believe Windows 11 will be a meaningful step up in security, and they agree with Microsoft's strategy of putting security first."

Stephen Kleynhans, the Research Vice President of Gartner, an American research firm, felt that Microsoft was "looking at the entire stack from the hardware up through the applications and the user experience and trying to make the entire stack work better and more securely.

=== Launch ===
Andrew Cunningham of Ars Technica gave a mixed but overall cautiously positive review of Windows 11 upon its release. He praised the improvements to its visual design (describing the new "Mica" appearance as reminiscent of the visual appearance of iOS and macOS, and arguing that Microsoft had "[made] a serious effort" at making the user-facing aspects of Windows 11 more consistent visually. He also praised window management, performance (assessed as being equivalent to if not better than Windows 10), other "beneficial tweaks". Criticism was raised towards Widgets' lack of support for third-party content, thus limiting it to Microsoft services only, regressions in taskbar functionality and customization. He also noted the inability to easily select default applications for common tasks such as web browsing, as it requires the user to select the browser application for each file type individually. Apart from the user interface, system requirements and Microsoft's unclear justification for its processor compatibility criteria remained a major sticking point for him. While some of the system requirements have brought greater public attention to hardware security features present on modern PCs, he argued that these could already be employed on Windows 10, albeit optionally. Cunningham concluded that "as I've dug into [Windows 11] and learned its ins and outs for this review, I've warmed to it more", but argued that the OS was facing similar "public perception" issues to Windows Vista and Windows 8. However, he noted that 11 did not have as many performance issues or bugs as Vista had upon its release, nor was as "disjointed" as 8, and recommended that users who were unsure about the upgrade should stay on Windows 10 in anticipation of future updates to 11.

Tom Warren of The Verge described Windows 11 as being akin to a house in the middle of renovations, but that "actually using Windows 11 for the past few months hasn't felt as controversial as I had expected"—praising its updated user interface as being more modern and reminiscent of iOS and ChromeOS, the new start menu for feeling less cluttered than the Windows 10 iteration, updates to some of its stock applications, and Snap Assist. Warren noted that he rarely used the Widgets panel or Microsoft Teams, citing that he preferred the weather display that later versions of Windows 10 offered, and did not use Teams to communicate with his friends and family. He also acknowledged the expansion of the Microsoft Store to include more "traditional" desktop applications. However, he felt that Windows 11 still felt like a work in progress, noting UI inconsistencies (such as dark mode and new context menu designs not being uniform across all dialogues and applications, and the UWP Settings app still falling back upon legacy Control Panel applets for certain settings), regressions to the taskbar (including the inability to move it, drag files onto taskbar buttons to focus the corresponding application, and the clock only shown on the primary display in multi-monitor configurations), and promised features (such as dynamic refresh rate support and a universal microphone mute button) not being present on the initial release. Overall, he concluded that "I wouldn't rush out to upgrade to Windows 11, but I also wouldn't avoid it. After all, Windows 11 still feels familiar and underneath all the UI changes, it's the same Windows we've had for decades."

Mark Hatchman of PC World was more critical of Windows 11, arguing that it "sacrifices productivity for personality, but without cohesion", commenting upon changes such as the inability to use local "offline" accounts on Windows 11 Home, regressions to the taskbar, a "functionally worse" start menu, Microsoft Teams integration having privacy implications and being a ploy to coerce users into switching to the service, File Explorer obscuring common functions under unclear icons, forcing users to scroll through many options to discourage changing the default web browser from Microsoft Edge, and that the OS "anecdotally feels less responsive, slower, and heavier than Windows 10". He concluded that Windows 11 "feels practical and productive, but less so than its predecessor in many aspects", while its best features were either "hidden deeper within", required specific hardware (DirectStorage, Auto HDR) or were not available on launch (Android app support).

=== Gaming performance ===
Critics have also noted that as of 2024, Windows 11 was slower for gaming than Windows 10. Some games, such as Cyberpunk 2077 and A Plague Tale: Requiem, ran 10% faster on Windows 10 than on Windows 11. This was a reversal of early profiling which suggested an advantage for Windows 11. Adoption briefly overtook Windows 10 among Steam users in early 2025, only for this to be dramatically reversed that March with a 10% rise in Windows 10 users. This may be related to consumer changes in China.

The poor performance of Windows 11 for gaming has been highlighted as an issue for handheld gaming computers with the launch of the ROG Xbox Ally. Valve's SteamOS performs faster, has a more cohesive interface, and a larger install base thanks to the success of the Steam Deck. Notably, the ROG Ally consistently performs better if users replace Windows 11 with SteamOS. The difference was more noticeable on the ROG Xbox Ally, where replacing Windows 11 with Bazzite can increase framerates by 32% for Kingdom Come Deliverance 2.

=== Market share ===
Windows 11 was slow to be adopted, with Microsoft relying on "annoying" ads and pop-ups to convince Windows 10 users to upgrade. PC Mag listed reasons that people were avoiding the upgrade, commenting that "Windows 10 does everything just as well, and in some cases even better."

Adoption remained slow until early 2025, ahead of the end-of-life for Windows 10. Windows 11 did not overtake Windows 10's market share until July 2025, approximately four years after launch and only three months before Windows 10's end-of-life. The shift in mid 2025 was largely driven by enterprise upgrades rather than individual consumers. As of July 2025, Windows 11 stood at 50.24% share. The hardware requirements for Windows 11, and the large number of incompatible devices still in use meant that there was also an increase in Linux use over the period, reaching 5% of desktop market share.

Adoption among PC gamers was similarly slow, but on balance faster than with other kinds of users. According to Valve Corporation's hardware and software survey, the market-share of Windows 11 among the user-base of Steam (the leading digital distribution platform for computer games) started overtaking that of Windows 10 by August 2024. As of September 2025, a month ahead of Windows 10's end-of-life, Windows 11's share among Steam users sits at 66 percent of Windows systems, and 63 percent of all systems.

== See also ==
- List of operating systems
- Android 12
- Windows 10
- iOS 15
- macOS Monterey

== Notes ==
Preceded by Windows 10	Windows 11; 2021	Succeeded by TBA
