= Dual-touchscreen =

Digital display setup

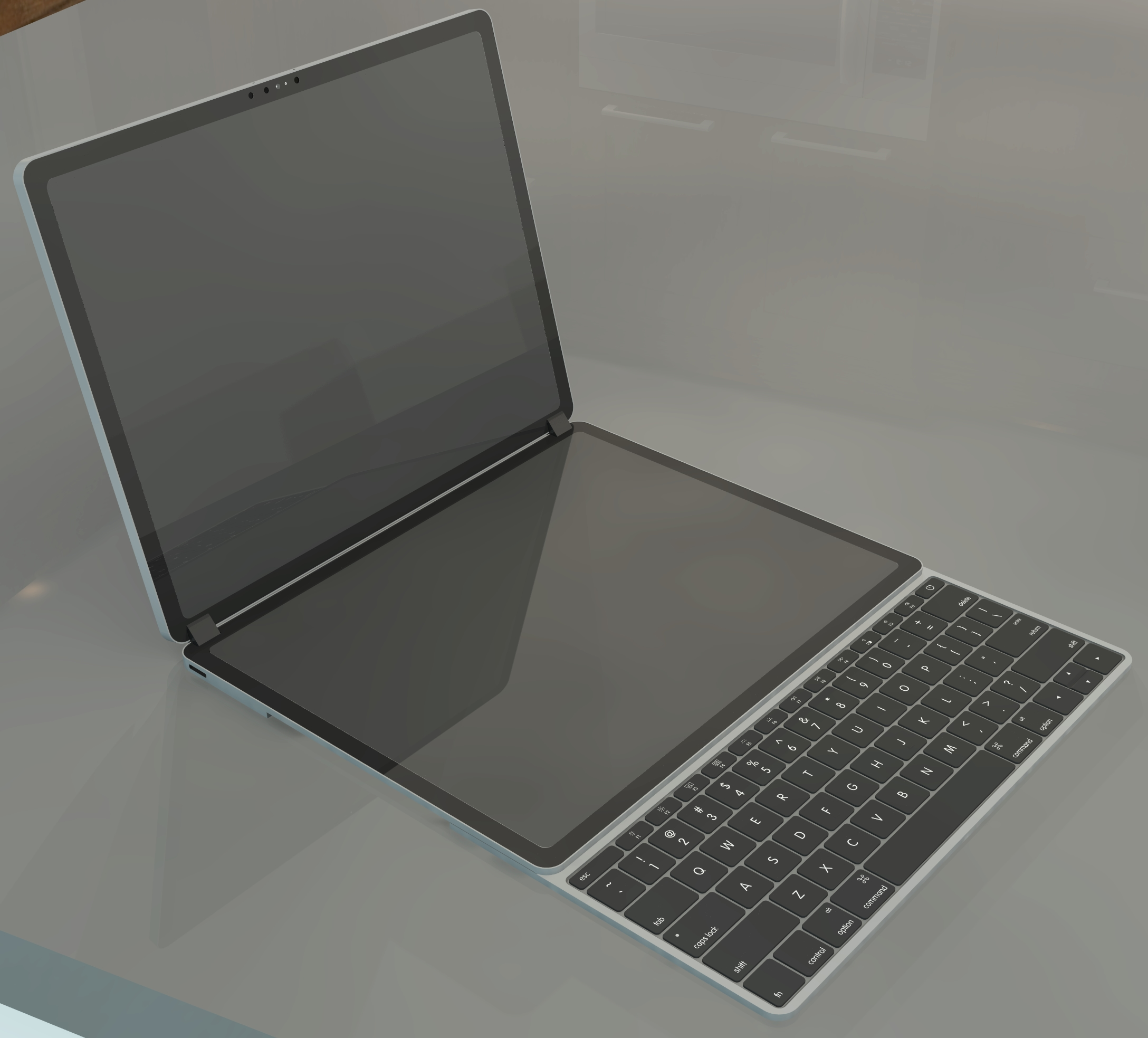
Foldable dual touch screen device with slide out keyboard

A dual-touchscreen is a computer or phone display setup which uses two screens, either or both of which could be touch-capable, to display both elements of the computer's graphical user interface and virtualized implementations of common input devices, including virtual keyboards. Usually, in a dual-touchscreen computer or computing device, the most persistent GUI elements and functions are displayed on one, hand-accessible touchscreen (changing with the software application in use) alongside the virtual keyboard, while the other, more optically-centric display is used for those user interface elements which are either less or never accessed by user-generated behaviors.

This approach is similar to that of the Nintendo DS handheld game console's construction, in which user-generated actions are initialized on the lower resistive touchscreen while the resulting graphical displays are executed in the upper screen. The same approach was adopted on its successor unit, the Nintendo 3DS and a similar concept was created for Nintendo's eleventh home console, the Wii U, with its controller's resistive touchscreen used in the same fashion as the lower part of the DS/3DS, and the secondary screen connected to the console.

== Use in products ==
Samsung foldable smartphones

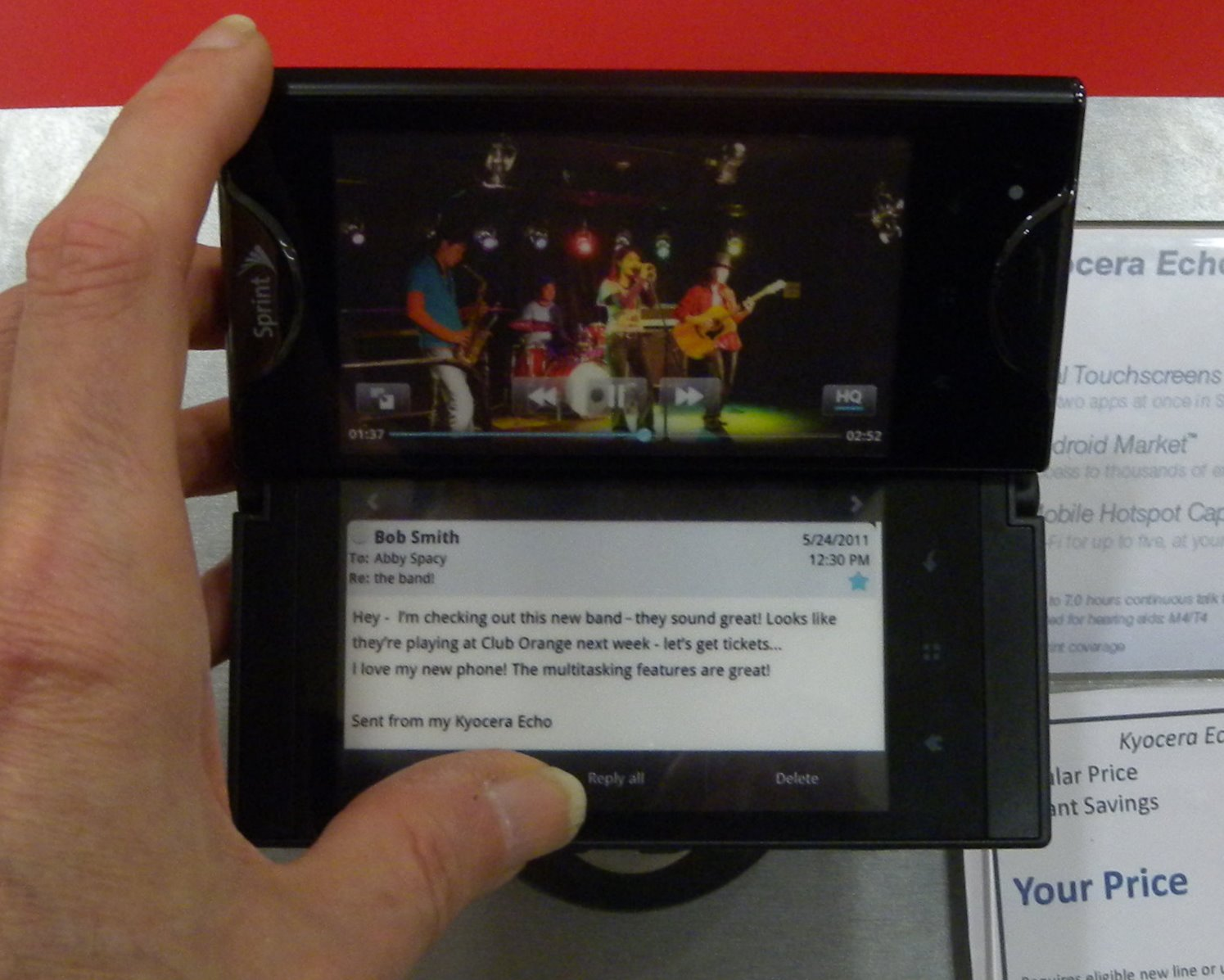
Kyocera Echo

- In 2004, Italian design firm V12 Design designed a prototype dual-touchscreen laptop known as the Canova.
- In 2007, Pennsylvania-based company Estari released its 2-VU laptop, initially for the United States military before a public release.
- In 2008, the OLPC XO-2 was announced to use a dual-touchscreen setup.
- In May 2009, The Asus Flipbook was first demonstrated, at CeBIT as a dual-touchscreen laptop with the ability to optionally display user interface elements in both screens both horizontally and vertically; the concept design was renamed as the Asus "Eee Reader", rebranded as an e-book reader, and scheduled for launch in Q4 2009. The device was finally renamed as "Eee Book" and scheduled for a June 2010 release at Computex in Taipei.
- In March 2010, the EnTourage eDGe was released, also directed more as e-reader than as computer. One of the two touchscreens is monochrome E Ink, the other is color liquid crystal display (LCD).
- In January 2010, Micro-Star International (MSI) showed a prototype of a dual-touchscreen netbook at Consumer Electronics Show (CES).
- In June 2010, Toshiba released the Libretto W100 dual-touchscreen notebook running Windows 7.
- In January 2011, NEC announced the LT-W Cloud Communicator, a slate with dual touchscreens that unfolds like a book and runs Android 2.1.
- In March 2011, Acer released the Iconia 6120 dual-screen touchbook notebook running Windows 7.
- In April 2011, Kyocera International released the Kyocera Echo smartphone running Android 2.2 Froyo.
- In April 2011, Sony announced the code-named S2, since renamed Sony Tablet P, running Android 3.1 Honeycomb, and scheduled for release in autumn 2011.
- In April 2013, NEC released the Medias W N-05E smartphone running Android 4.1 Jelly Bean.
- In October 2017, ZTE announced the ZTE Axon M smartphone running Android 7.1 Nougat.
- In 2018, Lenovo released the Yoga Book C930, featuring one IPS display and one E Ink display.
- In February 2019, LG announced an optional second screen for the LG V50.
- In March 2019, Samsung Electronics announced a dual-touchscreen foldable smartphone: the Samsung Galaxy Fold.
- In October 2019, Microsoft announced two dual-screen devices: the Surface Duo and Surface Neo. The Surface Duo launched on 10 September 2020.
- In October 2020, LG released the LG Wing running Android 10.
- In September 2021, Microsoft released the Surface Duo 2 running Android 11.
- In January 2023, Lenovo announced the Yoga Book 9i dual-touchscreen notebook running Windows 11.
- In January 2024, Asus announced the ZenBook Duo dual-touchscreen notebook running Windows 11.
- In September 2026, Apple announced the iPhone Duo, a passport-shaped dual-touchscreen foldable smartphone running iOS.

== See also ==
- Flexible display
- Foldable smartphone
- List of dual-touchscreen devices
- Second screen
- Pen computing
