= Toshiba Libretto W100 =

- Product family: Libretto
- Released: July 2010
- Introductory price: $1,099.99
- Operating system: Windows 7 Home Premium
- CPU: Intel Pentium U5400; 1.20 GHz, Cache, 18W
- Memory: 2 GB (DDR3)
- Storage: 64 GB SSD
- Removable storage: MicroSD
- Display: 2x 7 inches 1024 x 600 LCD
- Camera: 1.0 MP
- Connectivity: Wi-Fi (802.11 b/g/n), Bluetooth 2.1+EDR5
- Power: (18 W·h) 4-cell Battery (36 W·h) 8-cell Battery
- Dimensions: 7.95 in × 4.84 in × 1.2 in (202 mm × 123 mm × 30 mm)
- Weight: 1.8 lb (820 g)
- Website: toshiba.com at the Wayback Machine (archived 2010-08-08)

The Toshiba Libretto W100 is a dual-touchscreen computer from the Toshiba Libretto series.

== History ==
The W100 was released for the 25th anniversary of Toshiba in the laptop industry. It was released in July 2010.

== Specifications ==
- Windows 7
- Two capacitive touchscreens
- Intel Pentium U5400

== Reception ==
Engadget noted that the software was unstable in an early model. Techradar noted that the model is "on the chunky side". Popular Mechanics noted the clever design. ZDnet noted the high price tag.

== Further developments ==
Later in 2010, Acer also developed a laptop with two touchscreens.
