= Panos Panay (technology executive) =

American businessman

Panos Panay MBA BSC
- Born: Panos Costa Panay; United States
- Education: California State University, Northridge
- Known for: Surface, Chief Product Officer at Microsoft

Panos Costa Panay (Greek: Πάνος Κώστα Παναή) is a Greek American business executive. He leads Amazon’s consumer electronics business, which includes Alexa, Echo, Kindle, Fire TV, Fire tablets, Ring, eero, Blink, and the Amazon Appstore—as well as future looking initiatives such as Zoox autonomous vehicles, and Project Kuiper, which seeks to increase global broadband access with a constellation of satellites. He is the creator of the Microsoft Surface line of premium devices and the Windows 11 operating system. He was the chief product officer of Microsoft, where he oversaw the company's Windows and Devices division. He led the vision and strategy for Windows + Devices, which included the development and design of Windows and Windows 365, the development, design, supply chain, and manufacturing of Microsoft hardware, including Microsoft Surface and Mixed Reality devices, as well as the creation of EDU products and features. He announced that he was leaving Microsoft on September 18, 2023.

Panay introduced Windows 11 on the Windows Experience Blog on June 24, 2021, and launched the Microsoft Surface line of devices on October 26, 2012.

== Personal life ==
Panay received an M.B.A. from Pepperdine University and a B.Sc. from California State University, Northridge.

He is of Greek-Cypriot descent. His first cousin, Panos (Andreas) Panay, is a music entrepreneur. He has a son named Costas.

== Career ==
Before Microsoft, Panay was responsible for electromechanical devices at NMB Technologies (a subsidiary of MinebeaMitsumi) in Michigan from 2000 to 2004.

After joining Microsoft in the PC Hardware organization Panay is credited with creating the Surface line of premium devices in 2012 and Windows 11 in 2021.

At Microsoft, Panos Panay's title was executive vice president and chief product officer. He led the vision and strategy for Windows + Devices, which included the development and design of Windows and Windows 365, the development, design, supply chain, and manufacturing of Microsoft hardware, including Microsoft Surface and Mixed Reality devices, as well as the creation of EDU products and features. Since joining Microsoft in 2004, Panay has become known as a creative visionary in product-making. He created the Surface product line of premium devices in 2012.

Panay led the Microsoft team that developed the dual-screen Surface Duo phone, announced in October 2019 and released in September 2020. In 2020 he took over leadership of the Windows operating system at the company and created a new version of Windows - Windows 11 - in 2021. In late August 2021, he was promoted to become an executive vice president and joined the senior leadership team that advises CEO Satya Nadella.

On September 18, 2023, after 19 years of working at Microsoft, Panay announced he was leaving the company via X (Twitter) without announcing a specific plan for his future. He joined Amazon in October 2023.
