= Bicomponent fiber =

Two-component fiber

Bicomponent fiber is made of two materials, utilizing desired properties of each material. Such fibers can be created by extrusion spinning.

One or both materials may remain in the finished product, or one material may be dissolved, leaving only one material remaining. For example, DuPont created the highly coiled elastic fiber called cantrese having two different nylon polymers side-by-side.

== Formats ==
Formats of bicomponent fibers include:

Side-by-side

Extrusions are side-by-side within a single filament

Core-sheath

Extrusions with one material surrounding another

Segmented

Segmented like sections of a pie

Islands-in-the-sea

Islands-in-the-sea extrusions are also called matrix-fibril, because fibrils of one polymer are distributed in the matrix of another polymer. The matrix is known as the "sea", and the fibrils are known as islands. The matrix is a soluble material that is washed away by a suitable solvent at some point in the manufacturing process. What remains at the microscopic level are bundles of thin parallel fibers, resulting in a fabric that is very soft and flexible.

== Applications ==
Islands-in-the-sea can be melt blown to produce fabric such as Alcantara.

== See also ==
- PTFE fiber
