= Alcantara (material) =

Suede-like synthetic textile

- Product type: Material
- Produced by: Alcantara S.p.A.
- Country: Japan; Italy
- Introduced: 1970s
- Related brands: Ultrasuede
- Website: www.alcantara.com

Alcantara
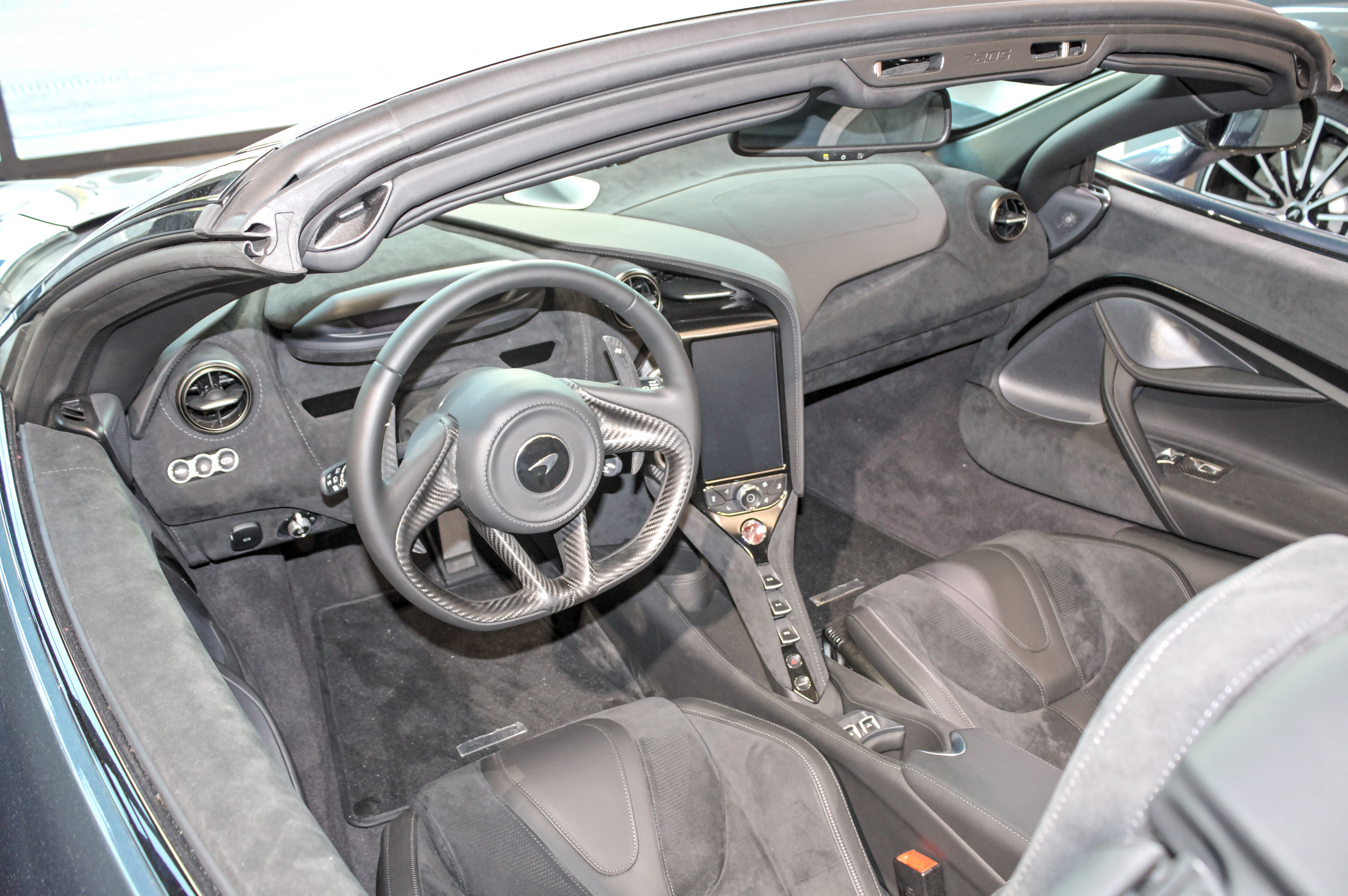
- Grey Alcantara in the interior of a McLaren 720S
- Material: 69% polyester and 31% polyurethane
- Production process: spinning process, chemical
- Introduced: 1970s
- Manufacturer: Alcantara S.p.A.

Alcantara is the brand name of a synthetic textile with a soft, suede-like microfibre pile, noted for its durability. Alcantara was developed in the 1970s by Miyoshi Okamoto and initially manufactured by the Italian company Alcantara. The term has an Arabic root (Arabic: القنطرة, romanized: al-qantara) and means "the bridge".

Alcantara is produced by combining an advanced spinning process (producing very low denier bicomponent "islands-in-the-sea" fiber) and chemical and textile production processes (needle punching, buffing, impregnation, extraction, finishing, dyeing, etc.) which interact with each other.

Alcantara is commonly seen in automotive applications, as a substitute for leather and vinyl in vehicle interior trim. It is also used in the design, fashion, consumer electronics and marine industries.

== History ==
The material was developed in the early 1970s by Miyoshi Okamoto, a scientist working for the Japanese chemical company Toray Industries. It was based on the same technology as another product from the same company named Ultrasuede. In 1972, a joint venture between Italian chemical company ENI and Toray formed ANTOR S.p.A. (renamed IGANTO S.p.A. shortly after in 1973, then finally Alcantara S.p.A. in 1981) in order to manufacture and distribute the material. The company is owned since 1995 by Toray and Mitsui.

== Composition ==
Alcantara is composed of about 68% polyester and 32% polyurethane, giving increased durability and stain resistance. The appearance and tactile feel of the material are similar to those of suede, and it may be erroneously identified as such.

Some versions are designated as flame retardant in order to meet certain fire standards for both furnishings and automobile applications.

== Uses ==
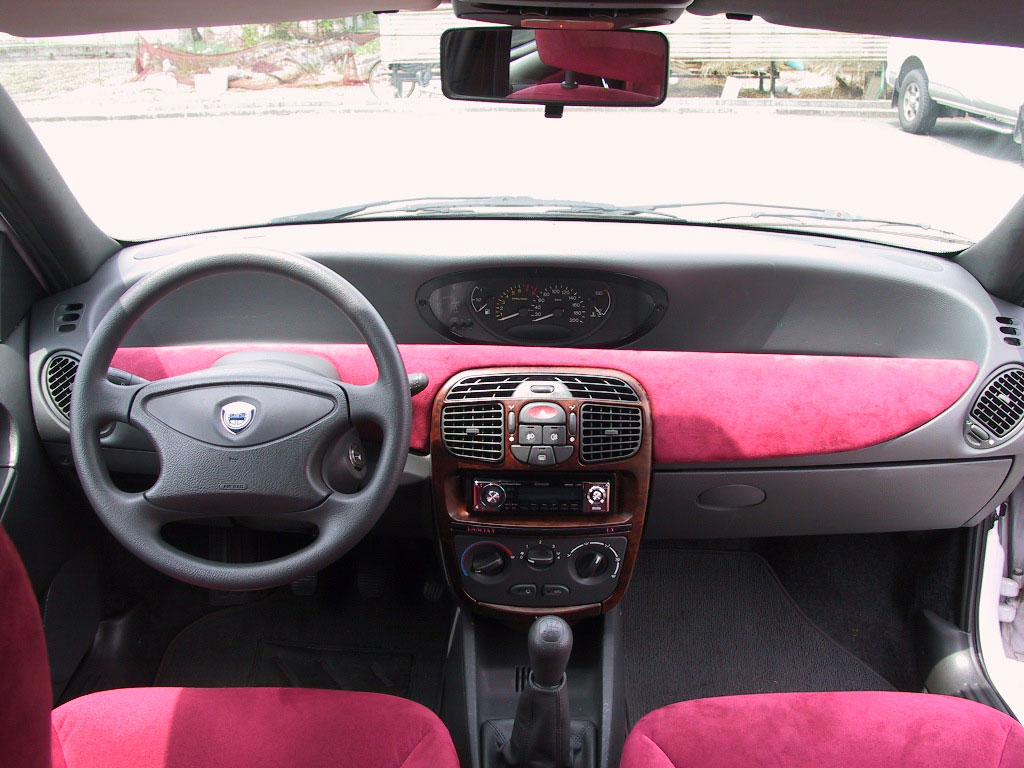
Pink Alcantara in the Lancia Y

Alcantara applications include furniture, clothing, jewelry, safety helmets and automobiles. In the latter it is used in seating, dashboard trim and headliners by many high-end OEM automotive suppliers. It is commonly used as steering wheel covering in many performance oriented vehicles. Louis Vuitton uses Alcantara linings in many of its bags. It appears in the collaboration with Takashi Murakami under the creative direction of fashion designer Marc Jacobs, wherein the white Multicolor Monogram bags have a bright fuchsia Alcantara lining.

Alcantara is used as a flame-retardant driver seat covering material for Formula One race cars, including the Williams Formula One 2011 FW33 car. Alcantara has a velvety texture and is soft to the touch, making it ideal for use in high-end phone cases, wallets, and other small accessories. It is also used as a covering material for high-end headphones, including the Sennheiser HD800, the Sennheiser Momentum On-Ear, and Bose QuietComfort 35 as well as for other consumer products, such as Microsoft's Alcantara keyboard cover for Surface Pro (2017) and Surface Go, Microsoft's Surface Laptop keyboard and Samsung's Galaxy S8, S8+, S9, S9+ and Note 8 smartphone covers. Alcantara is also used in the SpaceX Crew Dragon capsule. Overall, these factors and Alcantara's unique texture and luxurious feel make it a sought-after material in the fashion industry.
