= Lancia Ypsilon =

Supermini car

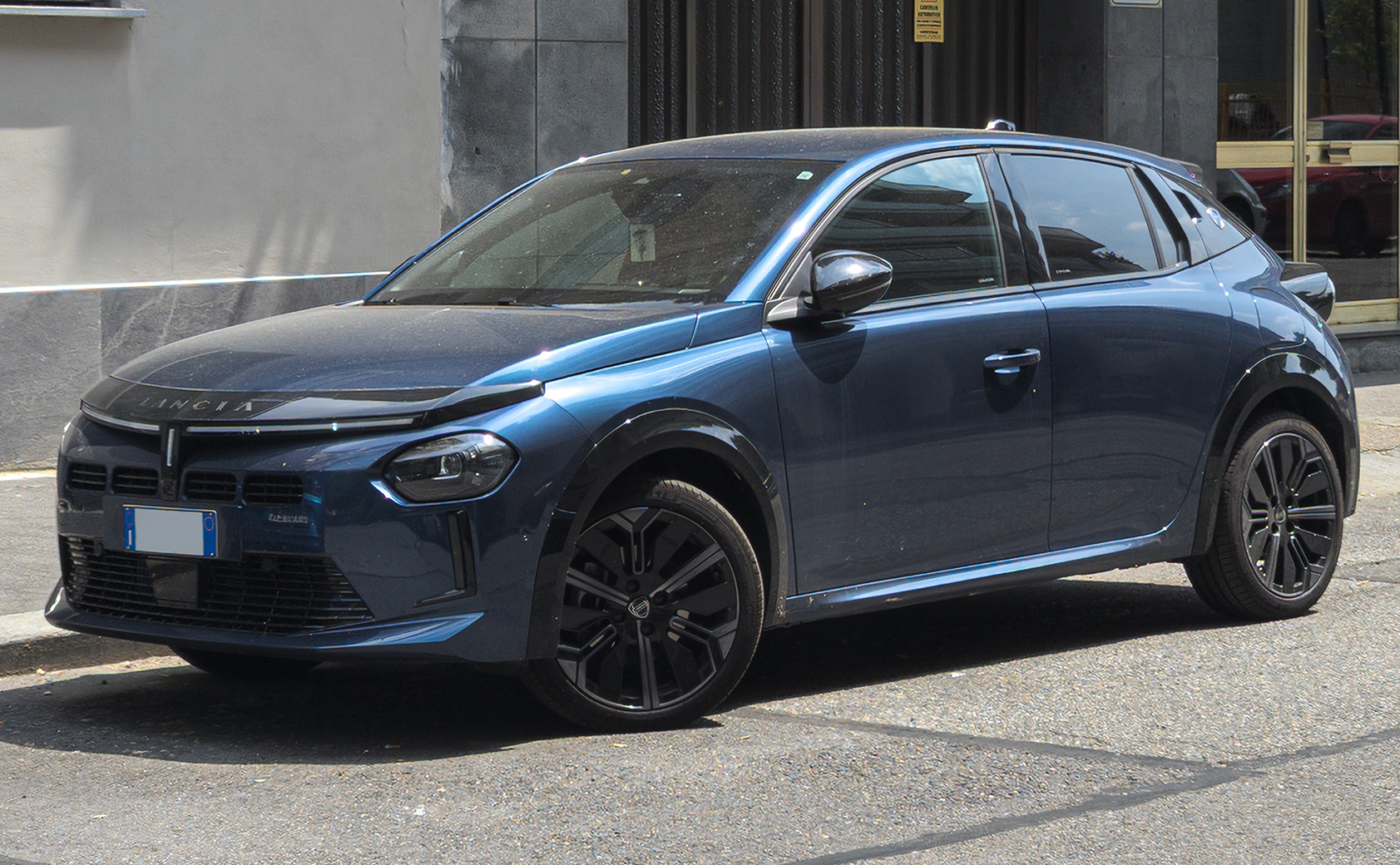

Overview
- Manufacturer: Lancia (Note: Fiat Auto (1995–2007); Fiat Group Automobiles (2007–2014); Fiat Chrysler Automobiles (2014–2021); Stellantis (2021–present))
- Also called: Chrysler Ypsilon (Ireland, Japan and UK)
- Production: 1995–present

Body and chassis
- Class: Supermini (B)
- Layout: Front-engine, front-wheel-drive

Chronology
- Predecessor: Autobianchi Y10

The Lancia Ypsilon is a supermini car manufactured and marketed by Lancia, currently in its fourth generation and as of 2024, the marque's only model. The Ypsilon was released in 1995, as a larger and more expensive replacement to the Y10. Between 1995 and 2005, Lancia produced more than 870,000 Ypsilons in the Melfi plant in the Potenza region.

The third generation Ypsilon, sharing its platform with the Fiat 500, was marketed also as the Chrysler Ypsilon in the United Kingdom, Ireland and Japan. Fiat Group discontinued the Chrysler variant in 2015, having marketed 2,000 units in 2014. It is also no longer sold in Japan, with the discontinuation of both the Lancia Voyager and Lancia Thema branding on Chrysler-built vehicles in 2015.

Despite relative obscurity worldwide and in Europe, the Lancia Ypsilon is a popular offering in Italy. Between 1995 and 2019, Lancia sold over 1.6 million Y and Ypsilon examples in Italy alone. In 2023, despite its age, it had the first highest market share in the B-segment in the country.

== First generation (1995) ==
First generation
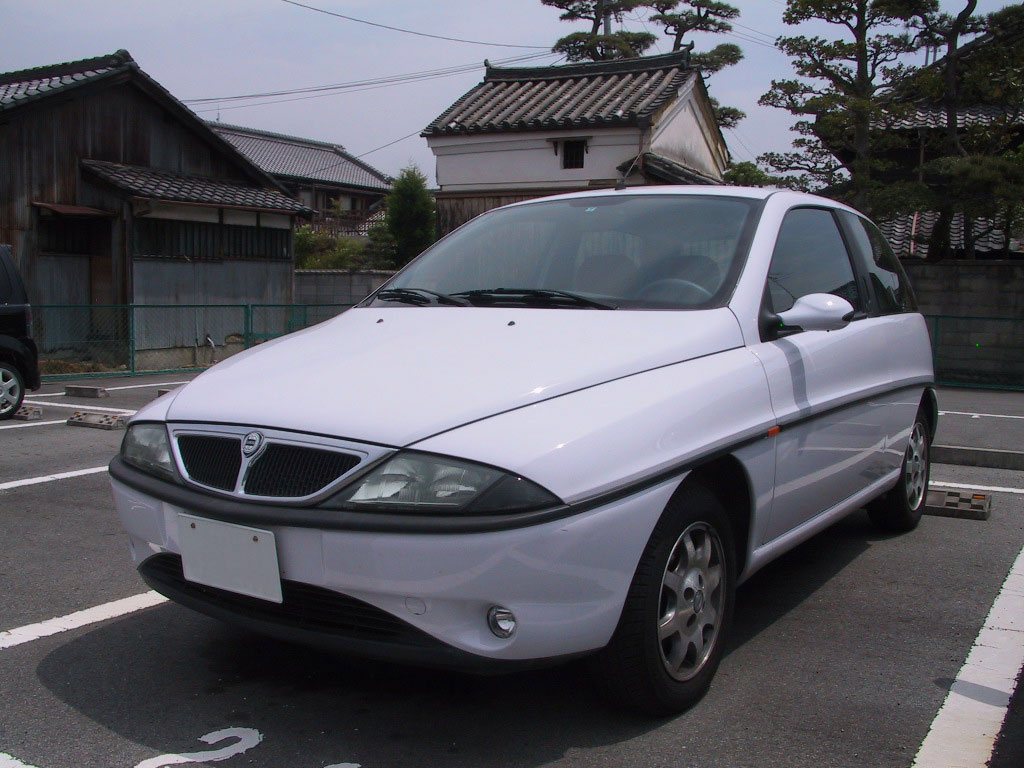

Overview
- Model code: Type 840
- Production: June 1995–2003
- Assembly: Italy: Melfi
- Designer: Enrico Fumia at Centro Stile Lancia

Body and chassis
- Body style: 3-door hatchback
- Related: Fiat Punto (176)

Powertrain
- Engine: petrol: 1.1 L Fire 8V I4; 1.2 L Fire 8/16V I4; 1.4 L Fiat Family B 12V I4
- Transmission: 5/6-speed manual ECVT automatic

Dimensions
- Wheelbase: 2,380 mm (93.7 in)
- Length: 3,723 mm (146.6 in) (1996–2000); 3,740 mm (147.2 in) (2000–2003)
- Width: 1,690 mm (66.5 in)
- Height: 1,435 mm (56.5 in)

=== 1995–2000 ===
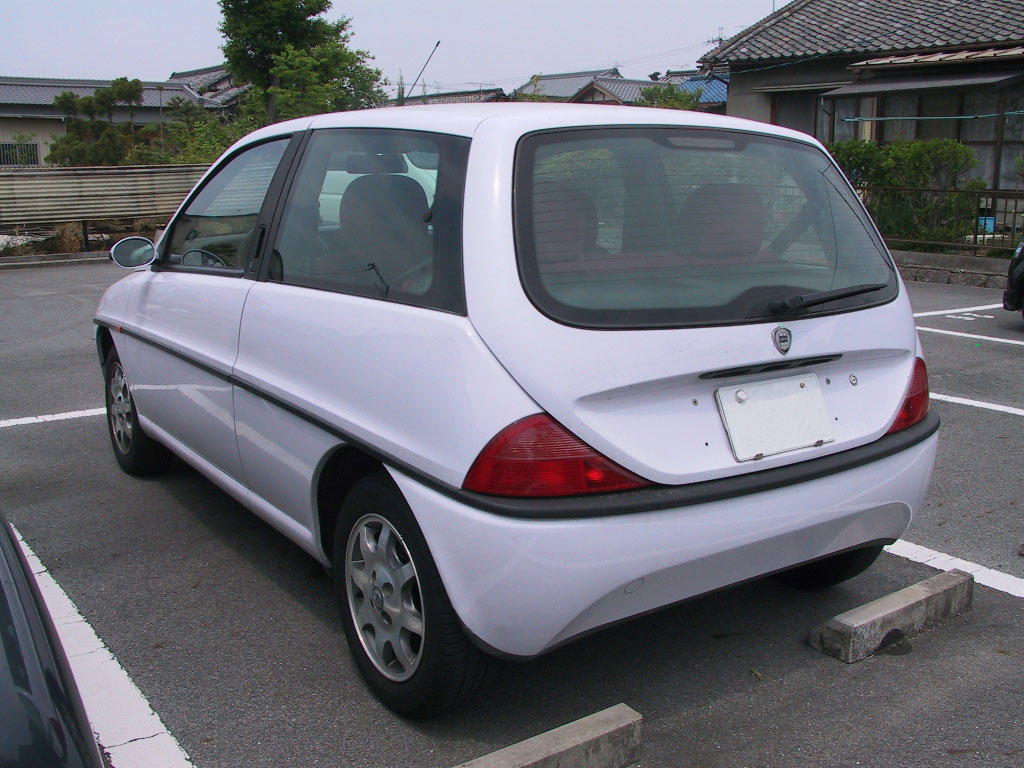
pre-facelift Lancia Ypsilon rear

The Lancia Ypsilon or Y (Type 840) was designed by Enrico Fumia in 1992. It was developed over 24 months at a cost of around 400 billion Italian lira and was presented in Rome in January 1996. The arches defined the car, repeating themselves on all sides of the car. The length is 3.72 m, 33 cm longer than the Y10. The Lancia Y was built on the same platform of the Fiat Punto series 176 (the same platform as the Barchetta), with a shortened wheelbase and an all-independent suspension setup: MacPherson struts at the front, trailing arms at the rear.

The main features of the Lancia Y include five seats, a soft plastic dashboard, and accessories, and options, including body colors in 100 shades from the Lancia Kaleidoscope catalog. Another design property that distinguished the Y was the instrument cluster in the center of the dashboard, which was adopted by the Musa and Ypsilon later in 2003.

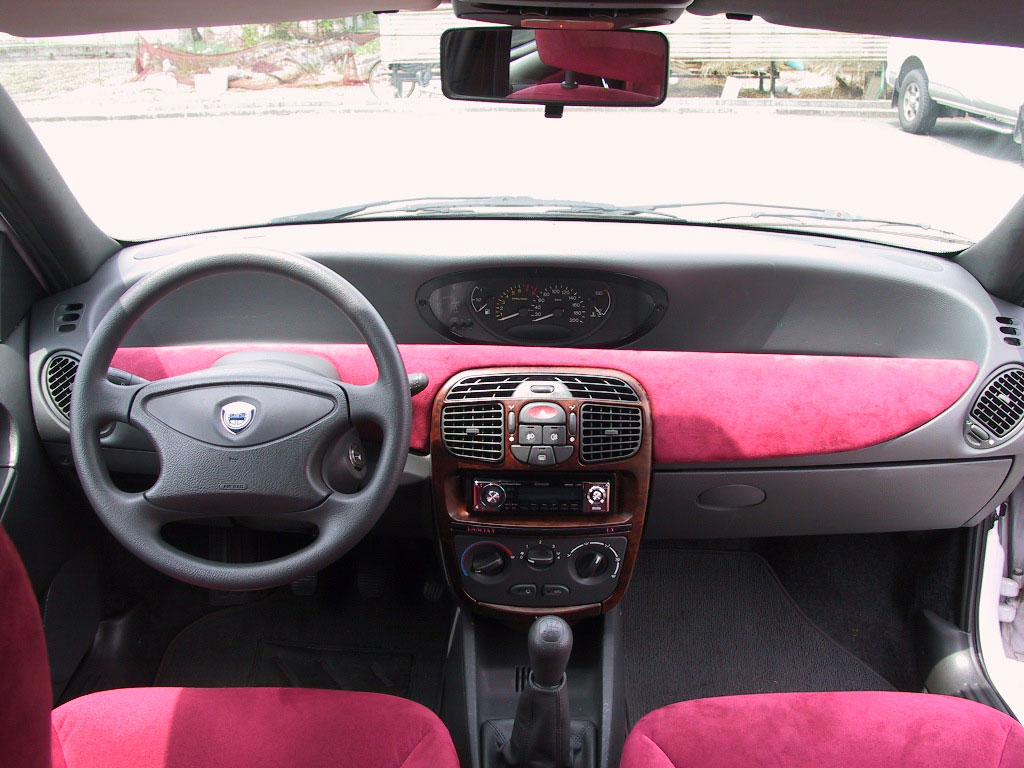
Lancia Y interior in Alcantara

Initially, the range featured three trim levels: LE, LS, and LX. A Cosmopolitan special edition of 600 pieces was later added. It was created through collaboration with the magazine, based on the LX trim. It was sold in the European market outside of Italy.

Air conditioning was standard on the LX and an option on the LS. The LX also offered an enhanced instrument cluster with a rev counter and a larger display that also displayed the outside temperature.

The engines were part of the FIRE series that debuted in the Y10 in 1985 and later was used in other Fiat and Lancia vehicles. They were available in displacements of 1,108 and 1,242cc with eight valves in an overhead camshaft arrangement. The top-of-the-line 1.4 12 valve "Pratola Serra" engine with 59 kW (80 PS) was carried over from the Fiat Bravo/Brava. Given the limited success of the Pratola Serra engine, it was soon replaced by the first so-called SuperFIRE engine, featuring four valves per cylinder and multipoint fuel injection. The Lancia Y was the first car to receive this evolution of the FIRE.

The 1,242cc SuperFIRE developed 63 kW (86 PS) at 6,000 rpm and a maximum torque of 113 Nm at 4,500 rpm. This engine remained available on the 2013 Lancia Ypsilon, 2013 Ford Ka, and the Fiat 500.

The Elefantino Rosso (English: Tiny Red Elephant, which was the symbol of the historic Lancia HF sports cars that won numerous rally competitions) was the sports version of the Lancia Y and the sister car to the Fiat Punto Sporting. It featured an interior in grey Alcantara, seats also in grey Alcantara and accentuated with dark grey fabric insets that echo the exterior color of the car, a center console, 15" wheels and rear-view mirrors in a titanium look, the steering wheel and gearshift in grey leather with red stitching, air conditioning, a shorter gearbox ratio for quicker acceleration from 0–100 km/h and in 5th gear, a lowered and stiffened suspension with bigger roll bars and more direct power steering. It reached a top speed of 177 km/h and was the only car in the lineup to receive 15" wheels with 195/50R15 tires. For those who desired a more discreet, comfortable, and luxurious ride, the LX (with an Alcantara and walnut veneer interior) and LS were also available with SuperFIRE. They were able to reach the same top speed as the "Pratola Serra" versions. The 1.2 8V was available with an automatic ECVT transmission.

Lancia had pulled out of RHD markets two years prior to the Y's launch. Thus, no RHD version was developed.

The Italian magazine Quattroruote test drove the "Ypsilon 16V LX" beyond its usual city use and praised its excellent power reserves while offering the comforts of a car worthy of a higher price. The model was an immediate success selling over 42,000 units in the first two months.

=== 2000–2003 ===
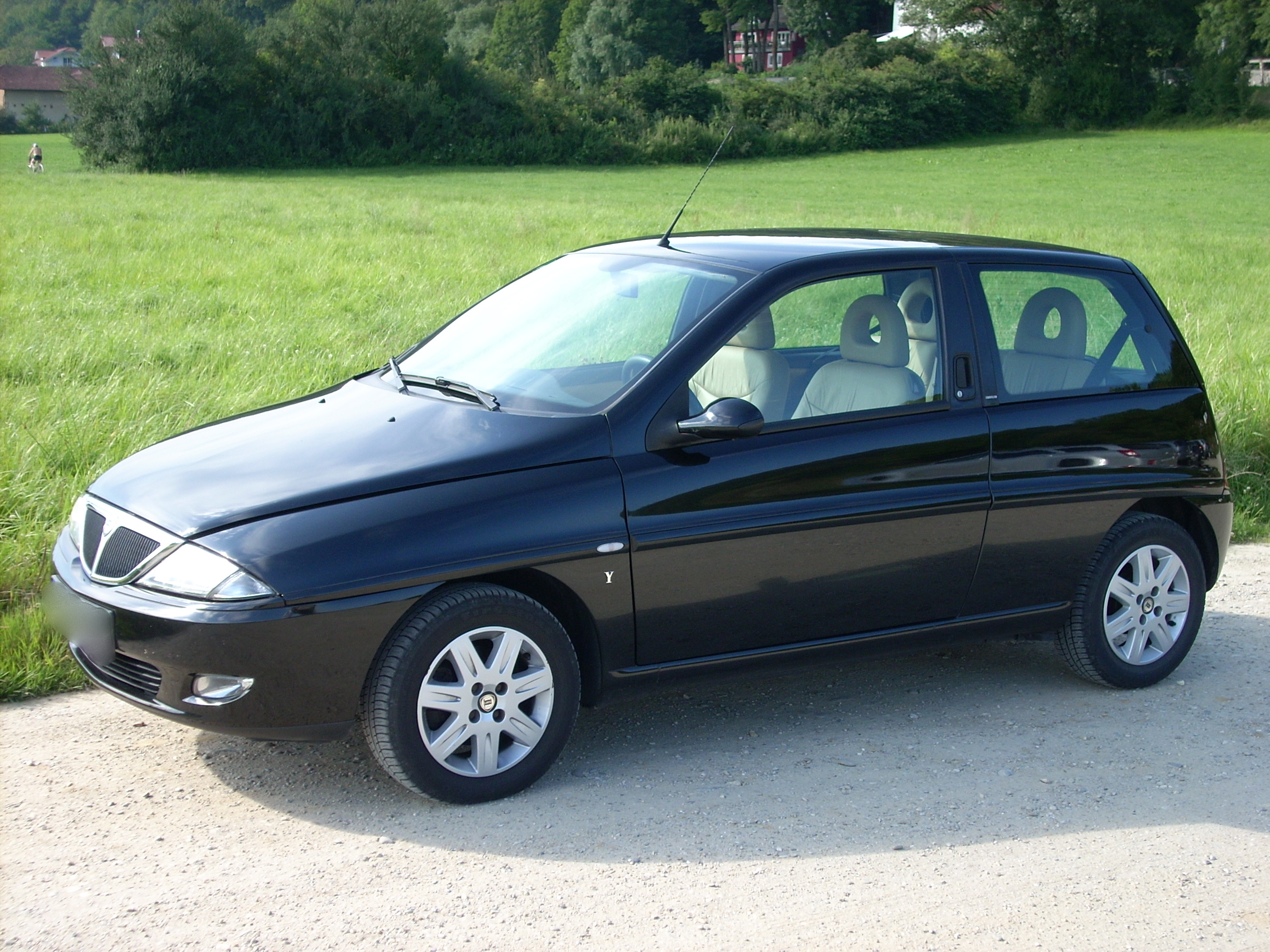
2000 Lancia Y facelift

In October 2000, the exterior and interior were restyled. The external changes included a new, larger grille, new bumpers, new taillights, new wheel cover designs, new fog lights. The side moldings of the car became much smoother and body-colored. The most significant internal change was the headrests (instead of drilled solids) and new seats and new steering wheel (similar to that of the Lancia Lybra). The material was no longer available with "soft touch", reflective security was removed from the doors, the climate control button was replaced with a lever, and the instrument panel was made more readable and modern, especially in the use of the LED display. The length of the car increased slightly from 3.72 metres to 3.74 metres.

The LX and Red Elephant versions, which cost €15,060 list, came with the standard including driver and passenger airbags, air conditioning, ABS, power steering, Blaupunkt radio/navigation system with 6 speakers, split rear seat with headrests, the Alcantara interior, outdoor temperature display, electrically operated door mirrors painted in body color, the helm station and instrument panel were red instead of green, central locking with remote control, power windows, adjustable seat and steering wheel, leather interior with red stitching on the Red Elephant, fog lamps and alloy wheels with 185/60 R 14 tires for the LX and 195/50 R15 for the Red Elephant.

The following years were marketed by other special versions: DoDo, Vanity and Unica. 16v versions reduce their output of 6 PS (4 kW) due to new Euro 3 pollution standards. Emissions were reduced with a more linear delivery, while maintaining, and sometimes even increasing, consumption.

Lancia reduced power from 60 PS on the 1242 cc, due to the addition of the sequential multipoint fuel injection system, costing power.

It also removed the 55 PS (40 kW; 54 hp) engine 1108 option, as it had not yet been adapted to the new Euro 3 directive, leaving the 60 PS (44 kW; 59 hp) 1.2 8v and 1.2 16v 80 PS (59 kW; 79 hp).

In September 2003, after nearly nine years of career and just above 804,600 units sold, its successor, the Lancia Ypsilon debuted, replacing it completely the following year.

=== Engines ===
Version	Availability	Displacement	Power	Torque	0–100 km/h (0-62 mph) (seconds)	"Highest permitted" top speed (km/h)	Combined Fuel economy (L/100 km)	CO_{2} emissions (g/100 km)
1.1 FIRE 8V	1996–2000	1108 cm^{3}	40 kW (54 PS; 54 hp) at 5,500 rpm	86 N⋅m (63 lbf⋅ft) at 3,250 rpm	15	150 km/h (93 mph)	6.3	150
1.2 FIRE 8V	1996–2000	1242 cm^{3}	44 kW (60 PS; 59 hp) at 5,500 rpm	98 N⋅m (72 lbf⋅ft) at 3,000 rpm	13.3 (13.5) (6-speed)	160 km/h (99 mph) (169 km/h (105 mph)) (6-speed)	6.7 (6.6) (6-speed)	158 (156) (6-speed)
1.4 Pratola Serra 12V	1996–1997	1370 cm^{3}	59 kW (80 PS; 79 hp) at 6,000 rpm	112 N⋅m (83 lbf⋅ft) at 4,000 rpm	12.4	170 km/h (106 mph)	7.8	185
1.2 FIRE 16V	1997–2000	1242 cm^{3}	63 kW (86 PS; 84 hp) at 6,000 rpm	113 N⋅m (83 lbf⋅ft) at 4,500 rpm	10.9	177 km/h (110 mph)	6.6	157
1.2 FIRE Elefantino Rosso 16V	1997–2000	1242 cm^{3}	63 kW (86 PS; 84 hp) at 6,000 rpm	113 N⋅m (83 lbf⋅ft) at 4,500 rpm	10.9	177 km/h (110 mph)	7	166
1.2 FIRE 8V	2001–2003	1242 cm^{3}	44 kW (60 PS; 59 hp) at 5,000 rpm	102 N⋅m (75 lbf⋅ft) at 2,500 rpm	14.1	158 km/h (98 mph)	5.7	136
1.2 FIRE 16V	2001–2003	1242 cm^{3}	59 kW (80 PS; 79 hp) at 5,000 rpm	114 N⋅m (84 lbf⋅ft) at 4,000 rpm	11.2	174 km/h (108 mph)	6	144

=== All versions ===
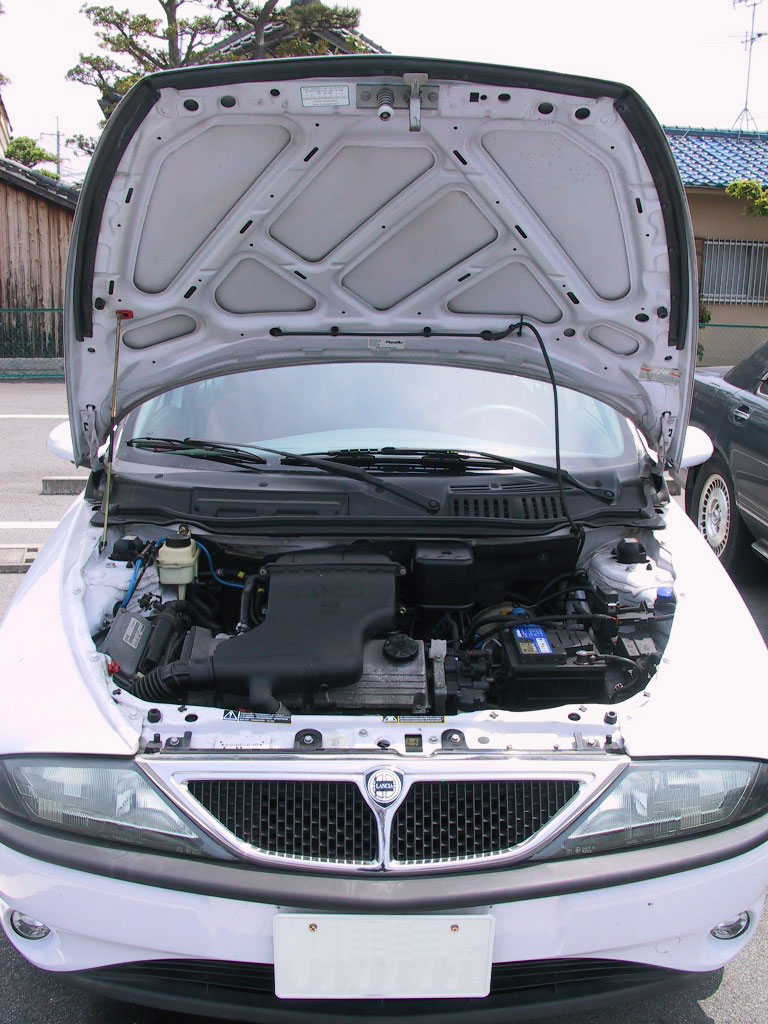
Lancia Y with 1.4 12V engine

- Lancia Y LE (1996)
- Lancia Y LS (1996)
- Lancia Y LX (1996)
- Lancia Y Elefantino Blu (1997)
- Lancia Y Elefantino Rosso (1997)
- Lancia Y Cosmopolitan (1998)
- Lancia Y Marie Claire (2000)
- Lancia Y DoDo (2001)
- Lancia Y Vanity (2001)
- Lancia Y Unica (2002)
- Lancia Y Caprice

=== Safety ===
The Y was awarded 2 stars in the Euro NCAP crash test for adult protection and Euro NCAP 2-star certification for pedestrian safety.

- Adult occupant =
- Pedestrian =

== Second generation (2003) ==
Second generation
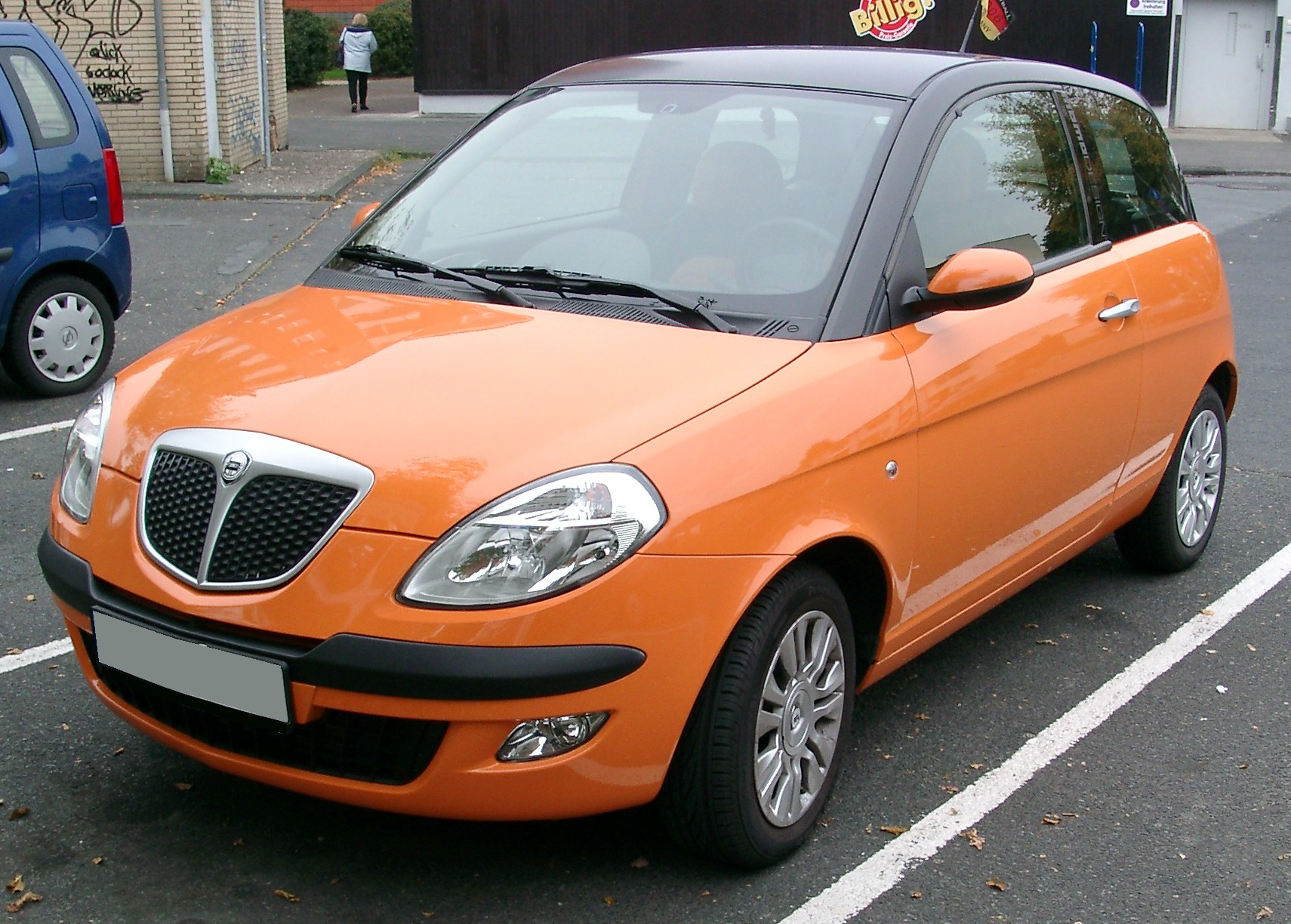

Overview
- Model code: Type 843
- Production: 2002–2011
- Assembly: Italy: Termini Imerese; Melfi
- Designer: Mike Robinson at Centro Stile Lancia

Body and chassis
- Body style: 3-door hatchback
- Platform: Fiat B
- Related: Lancia Musa; Fiat Punto (188); Fiat Idea; Zastava 10

Powertrain
- Engine: 1.2 L Fire I4 (petrol); 1.4 L Fire I4 (petrol); 1.4 L Fire EcoChic I4 (LPG); 1.3 L Multijet I4 (diesel)
- Transmission: 5-speed manual 6-speed manual 5-speed D.F.N. automated manual

Dimensions
- Wheelbase: 2,388 mm (94.0 in)
- Length: 3,778 mm (148.7 in) (2003–2006); 3,810 mm (150.0 in) (2006–2011)
- Width: 1,704 mm (67.1 in)
- Height: 1,530 mm (60.2 in)

=== 2003–2006 ===
The Ypsilon (Type 843) was Introduced in 2003 to access the Lancia range. It was designed to meet the needs of a young audience, and over time found sales, especially to women. It became the best-selling car of the Lancia range with an annual production of about 60,000 units. It was initially assembled at the Fiat plant in Melfi. In June 2005 production was moved to Sicily at the plant in Termini Imerese Palermo. The car uses a three-door body about 3.78 meters long, with the design inspired by the historic Lancia Ardea.

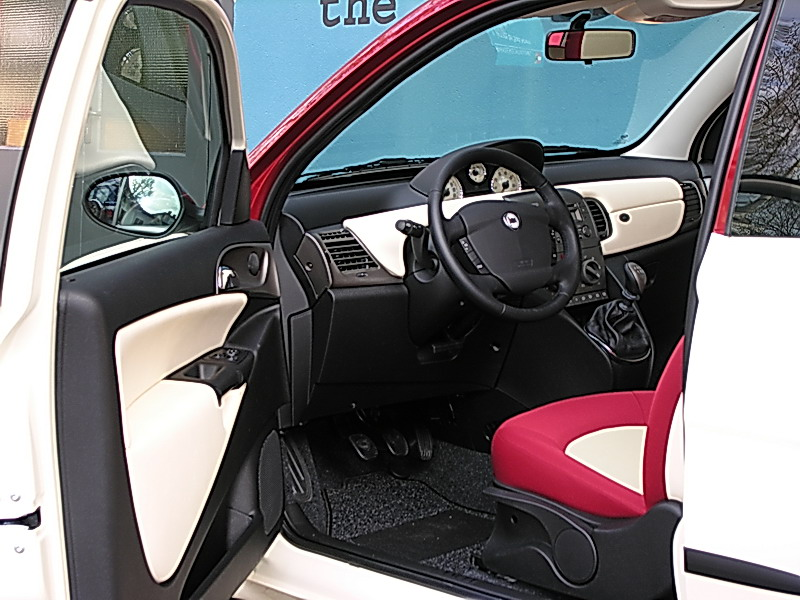
2003 Ypsilon inside

The front is characterized by a large chrome grille with lobes at the top. The lighting is placed at the ends of the front arch. The bumpers are characterized by the presence of an unpainted longitudinal fascia applied above the air intakes in which the fog lamps (in the top versions) are located at either end. A prominent rib runs along the sides. The tail has vertically oriented headlamps that culminate in the bumper and are integrated into the fenders. The rear tailgate has a small size that limits visibility, embellished by chromed fascia above the license plate.

The frame used a shortened wheelbase version of the B platform debuted with the Fiat Punto (188) and adopted also by the Fiat Idea and Lancia Musa. The engine is transverse front-mounted, with front-wheel drive. The front independent suspensions are MacPherson struts with stabilizer bar, with steel arms, while at the rear there is a semi-independent torsion beam suspension. The braking system makes use of ventilated discs at the front while classic drums are available at the rear, only for the Sport Momo Design versions the company has made available the four-disc braking system with stiffened set-up and suspension. All versions included Anti-lock Braking System (ABS) with Electronic Brake Distribution (EBD) and an electric power steering system that stiffens gradually, but among the options are combined electronic stability control and traction.

The interior is covered with plastic inserts on door panels and instrument panel is covered with AIRtex fabric, leather or Alcantara depending on the model. Two-tone upholstery and plastic inserts mimic aluminium. The upholstery is available in four different materials: "Glamour", AIRtex, alcantara, and leather. It offers large storage space in front of the driver and passenger. The air conditioning and radio controls were located in the central area, including the optional navigation system.

=== 2006–2010 ===
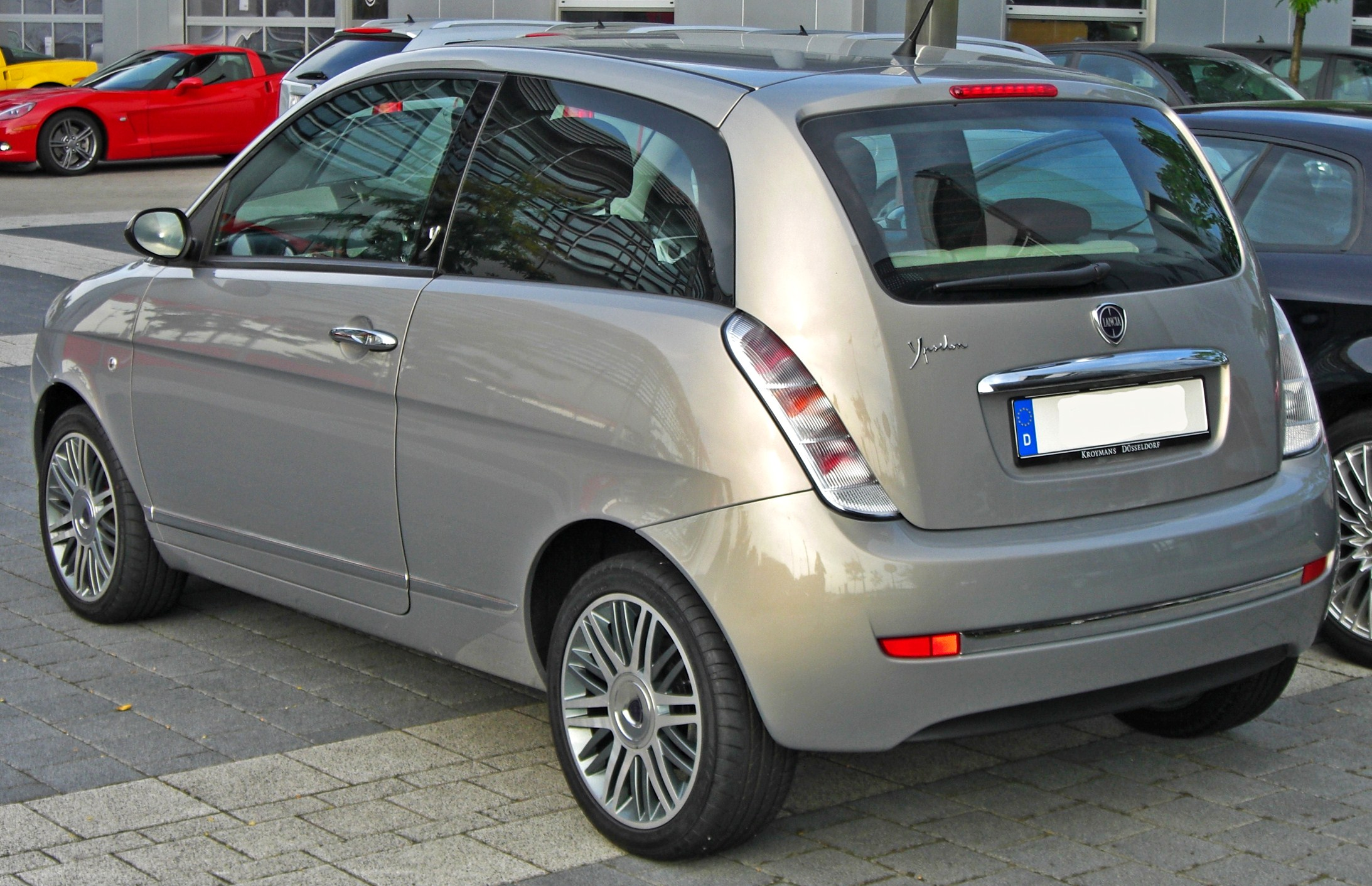
2006 Ypsilon facelift rear

In Autumn 2006 the Ypsilon received a touch-up that affected the engines and internals. It had a new front grille, more rounded bumpers with enlarged air intakes, and ice-effect rear light clusters. There are five versions: Argento, Passion, Oro Bianco, Oro Giallo e Platino. New fabrics for the seats came with new combinations of colours, and the dashboard trim is either lacquered silver or dark gray. The car has a new 1.3 Multijet 16v engine of 75, 90, or 105 horses. It also offered Blue&Me hands-free kit (Bluetooth with USB port), new colours, and new wheels.

The new Ypsilon can be equipped with Electronic Stability Control and hill holder for an extra charge, and has a grip of 0.93 g, although the roll is accentuated due to the soft suspension calibration. The shift lever is in a raised position and the rear seats come with split and sliding available in two versions (3 or 2 seats). The 2008 model introduced a DPF particulate filter as standard on all diesel engines except the 105 horsepower 1.3 Multijet diesel with the automated manual transmission D.F.N. (Dolce Far Niente).

=== 2010–2011 ===
In 2010, the exterior mirrors increased in size and darkened headlamps appeared. In 2011 Lancia introduced the final version called Ypsilon Unyca.

Production of the second generation Lancia Ypsilon ended on 23 November 2011 because Fiat Group closed the Termini Imerese factory where the Ypsilon was assembled. The third generation of Lancia Ypsilon was produced at Tychy in Poland.

=== Special edition ===
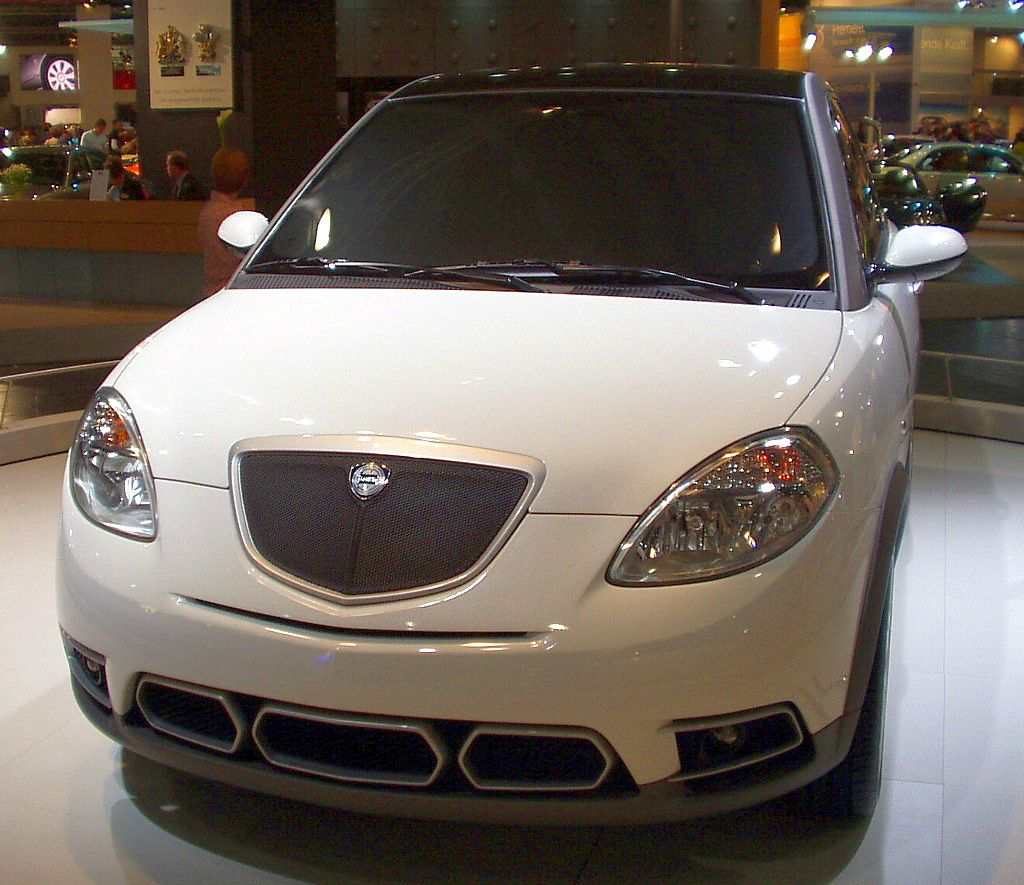
2005 Lancia Ypsilon Sport Zagato

The Ypsilon was produced in two body colours version (called B-colore), which recalls Lancia tradition. The best-selling Ypsilons were the Passion, the Momo Design and Sport Momo Design characterized by the double body-colour, distinguished between the top (side mirrors, roof and rear hatch) and the rest of the fairing, as well as some sporty details (alloy wheels, interior). It derives directly from a concept called Ypsilon Sport, presented at the Geneva Motor Show in 2005 and developed in collaboration with Zagato Design Centre. It differs from the concept version by its 1.4 Fire 95 PS gasoline and 1.3 Multijet diesel engines with 75, 90 and 105 PS, four-disc braking system with lowered suspension, tires and some "sporty" design features such as burnished and diamond wheels of Sport design, burnished chrome trim, and leather and Alcantara interiors by Momo Design.

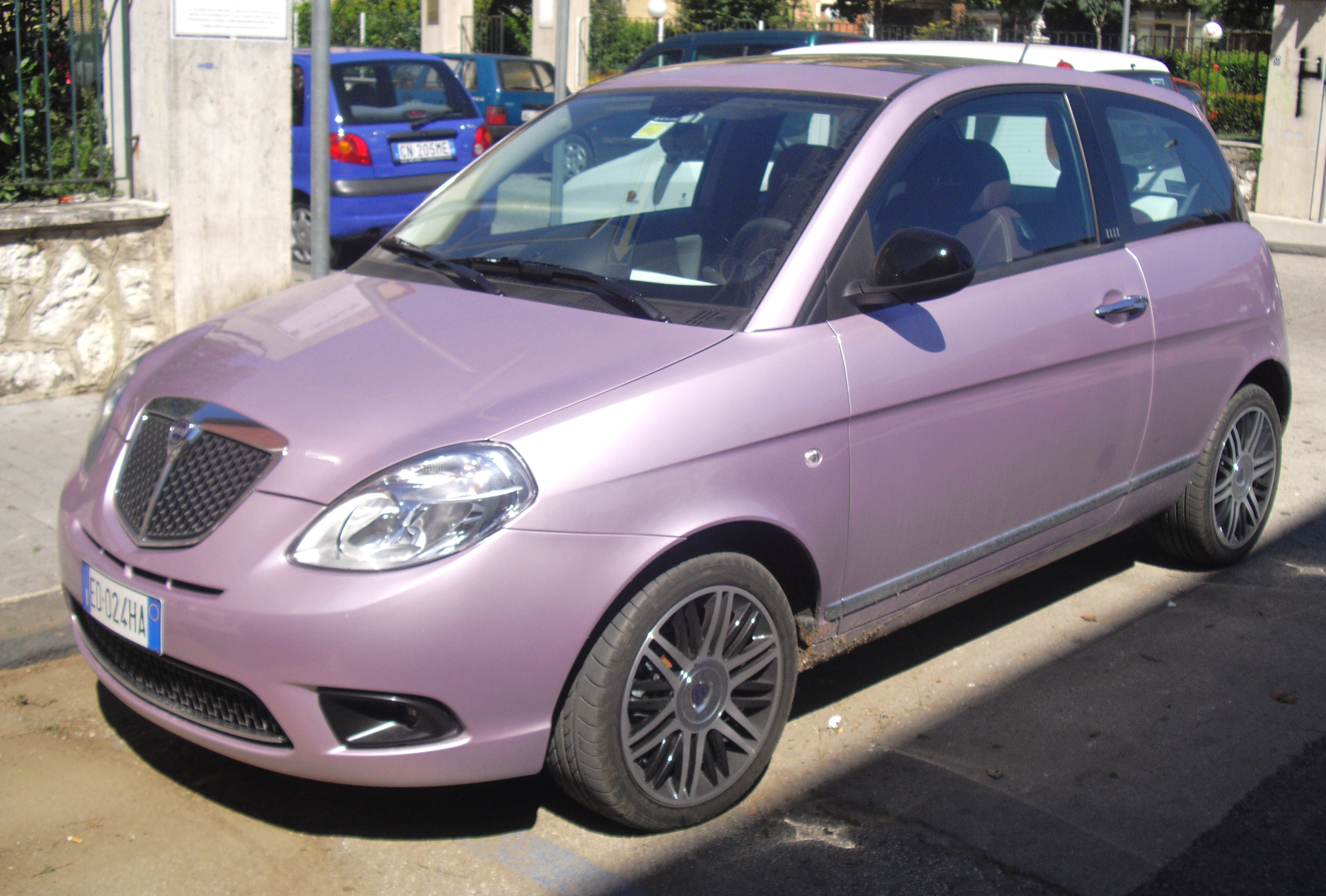
2010 Lancia Ypsilon Elle

In May 2008, as in 2006, the limited edition makeover ModaMilano returned with colour changes (TOP color Borromini Grey), bi-colour multi-spoke wheels, chrome trim and leather-covered dashboard instrument dome.

Since 2009, the Ypsilon Versus was a limited edition of just 1,000, designed by Versace, with Bronzino Bronze bodywork, dedicated interior and greenhouse, and 16-inch Sport darkened wheels. The Paris 2009 concept car was presented as Ypsilon Elle, carried out in collaboration with the women's magazine. Elle was characterized by special pink bodywork and interior trim. Also in 2009, the Ypsilon E-Collection arrived, characterized by low environmental impact engines with reduced carbon dioxide emissions dioxide and B-colore body paint.

By 2011, the full range met the Euro 5 emission standard. It offered a new interior trim and color palette. New "Monocular" headlamps with darkened inner dish and new rearview mirrors painted in gloss black appeared. Also in 2011, the Ypsilon Unyca debuted.

=== Engines ===
The engine range included a four-cylinder 1.2 Fire, expanded from 60 PS to 69 PS in October 2010. The 1.2 version was joined by a 16-valve, 80 PS (59 kW; 79 hp), replaced in 2006 by a 1.4 Fire 8 valve 78 PS (57 kW; 77 hp). The 1.4 engine was produced in 95 PS 16-valve version, while the 78 PS (57 kW; 77 hp) 1.4 8 valve was produced beginning in 2009 in version EcoChic powered by LPG or petrol.

The 1.3 Multijet diesel engine was produced from 2003 to 2006. It varied from 70 PS (51 kW; 69 hp) to 75 PS (55 kW; 74 hp). It was subsequently expanded to offer 90 and 105. The Multijet with D.P.F. had reduced emissions and fuel consumption.

==== Petrol ====
- 1.2 8V 60 PS (44 kW; 59 hp)
- 1.2 16V 80 PS (59 kW; 79 hp) (1st series)
- 1.4 8V 78 PS (57 kW; 77 hp) (2nd series)
- 1.4 16V 95 PS (70 kW; 94 hp)

==== Diesel ====
- 1.3 16V Multijet 69 PS (51 kW; 68 hp) (1st series)
- 1.3 16V Multijet 75 PS (55 kW; 74 hp) – 90 PS (66 kW; 89 hp) (2nd series), 105 PS (77 kW; 104 hp) (MomoDesign)

=== All versions ===
- Lancia Ypsilon Argento (2003)
- Lancia Ypsilon Oro (2003)
- Lancia Ypsilon Platino (2003)
- Lancia Ypsilon Passion (2003)
- Lancia Ypsilon B-Colore (2004)
- Lancia Ypsilon Black & Ivory (2004) (only in Switzerland)
- Lancia Ypsilon Glamour (2004) (only in Switzerland)
- Lancia Ypsilon MomoDesign (2005)
- Lancia Ypsilon Sport Zagato (2005) (prototype on the Geneva International Motor Show, never in production)
- Lancia Ypsilon Sport MomoDesign (2007)
- Lancia Ypsilon ModaMilano (2006 + 2008)
- Lancia Ypsilon Versus (2009)
- Lancia Ypsilon Elle (2010)
- Lancia Ypsilon Unyca (2011)
- Lancia Ypsilon Diva (2011) (only in Italy)

== Third generation (2011) ==
Third generation
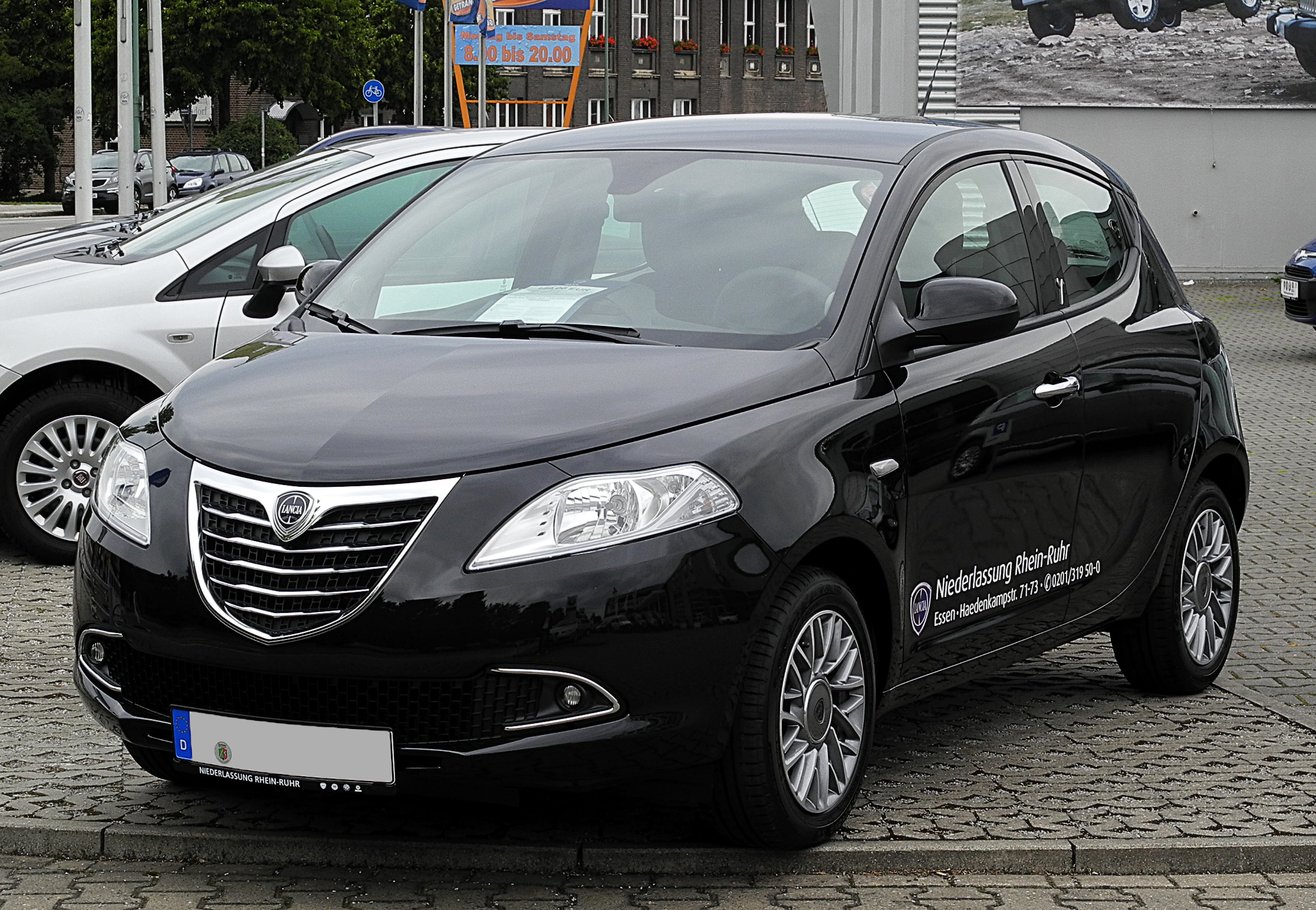

Overview
- Model code: Type 846
- Also called: Chrysler Ypsilon (Ireland, Japan and UK, 2011–2015)
- Production: 2011–2024
- Assembly: Poland: Tychy (FCA Poland)
- Designer: Alberto Dilillo at Centro Stile Lancia

Body and chassis
- Body style: 5-door hatchback
- Platform: Fiat Mini
- Related: Fiat Panda; Fiat 500; Ford Ka

Powertrain
- Engine: Petrol: 0.9 L TwinAir I2; 1.0 L GSE FireFly I3 mild hybrid; 1.2 L Fire I4; Petrol/CNG: 0.9 L TwinAir EcoChic I2; Petrol/LPG: 1.2 L Fire EcoChic I4; Diesel: 1.3 L Multijet I4
- Transmission: 5-speed C510 manual; 6-speed C610 manual; 5-speed C510 D.F.N. automated manual

Dimensions
- Wheelbase: 2,390 mm (94.1 in)
- Length: 3,840 mm (151.2 in)
- Width: 1,675 mm (65.9 in)
- Height: 1,510 mm (59.4 in)

The third generation was introduced at the Geneva Motor Show in 2011.

The first drawings of Type 846 were developed in late 2006 and early 2007 by the Lancia Style Centre, directed by Alberto Dilillo, before the Fiat/Chrysler alliance. The final model included only a few changes from the original, especially in the grille that recalls the style of most Chrysler models, with horizontal slats replacing the two lobes with vertical slats. From 2014 on, it was the sole model available in Lancia's range.

The third series of Ypsilon adopted a five-door body with rear door handles recessed into the door's trailing edge.

The third generation shares the Fiat Mini platform with the Fiat 500 and Panda. Production was moved to Fiat's Tychy plant, reaching 100,000 units per year at full capacity. The front suspension continued with independent wheel MacPherson struts at the front and the semi-independent torsion beam with a stabilizer bar at the rear.

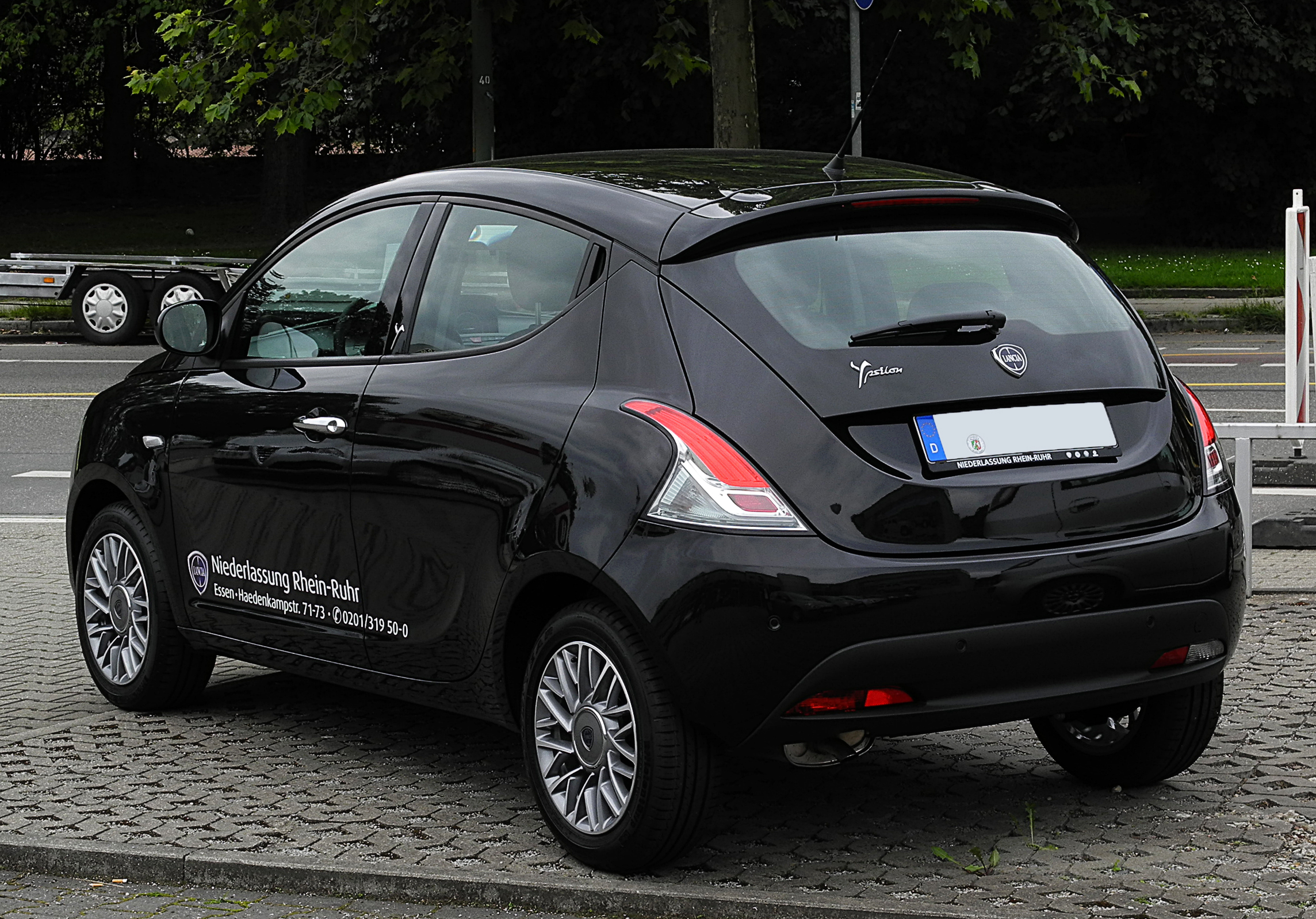
Lancia Ypsilon (Type 846) rear styling

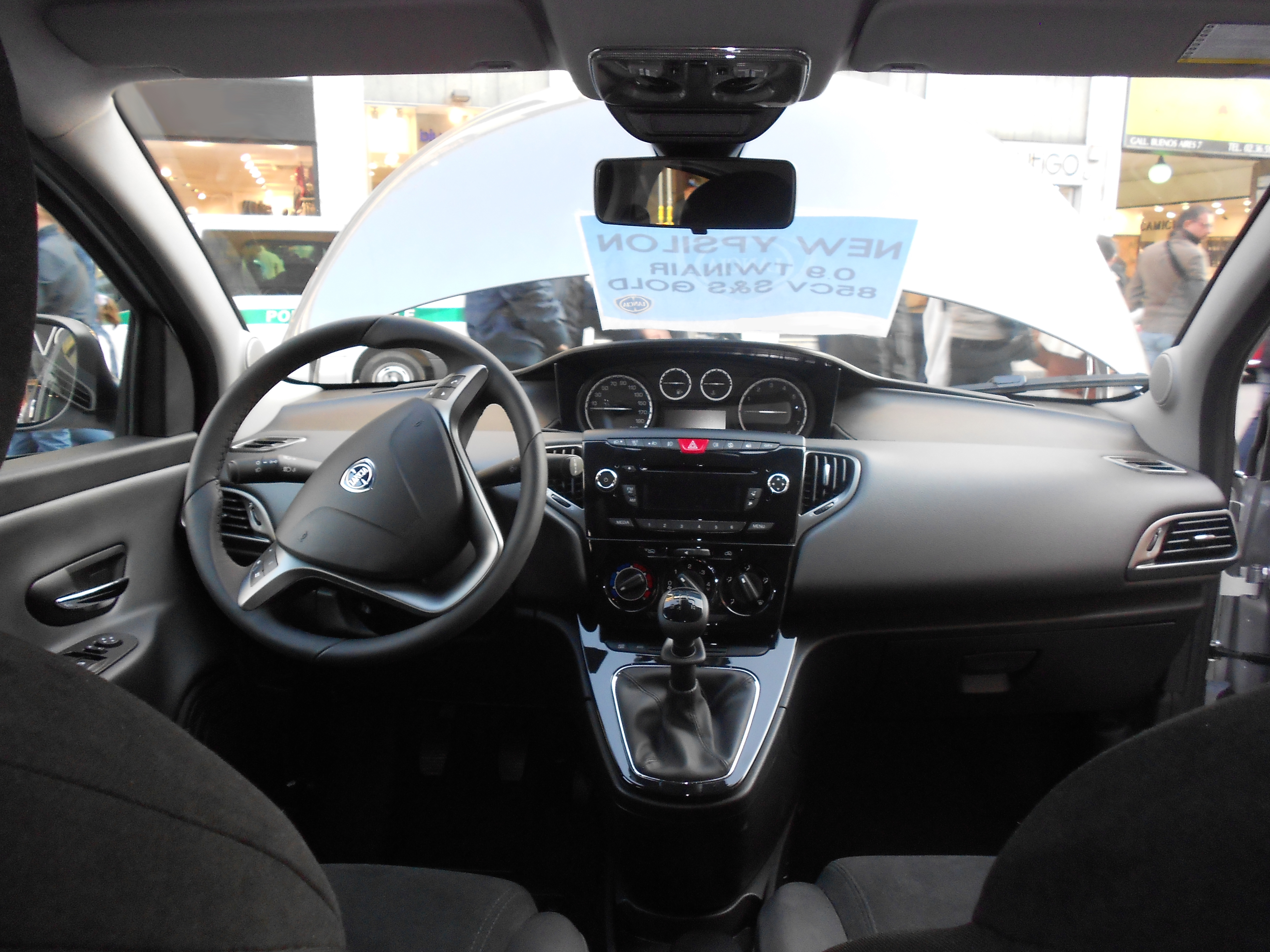
Lancia Ypsilon (Type 846) inside

The Ypsilon Type 846 received investment of €500,000,000 (150 for development, 40 for the industrial structure and the remainder for production). The body is 3.84 meters long with a wheelbase of 2.39 meters. The cabin is approved for 5 seats. At the launch up to 600 possible customization combinations with 16 exterior colors (including 4 Bi-color version).

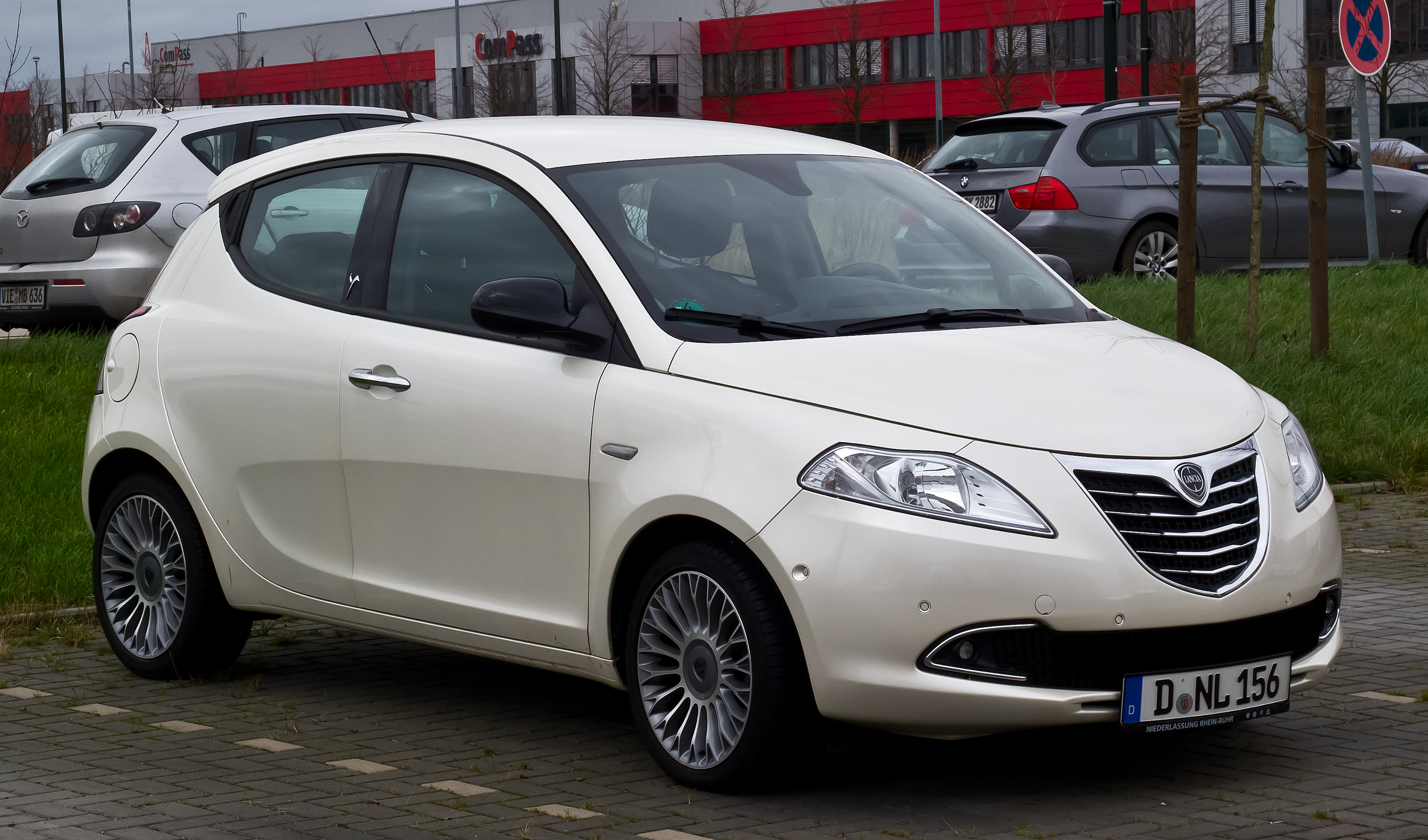
2012 Lancia in Düsseldorf, Germany

Accessories included an automatic parking system, marketed as Magic Parking, bi-xenon headlights and LED rear lights in addition to available automatic Start & Stop.

All models were equipped with standard four airbags and stability and traction control (ESP and ASR) with Hill Holder, and ABS with EBD. European versions included Silver, Gold and Platinum option packages. Type 846 continued to feature center-dash instrumentation.

Type 846 included a right-hand-drive variant for the UK and Ireland, where it was sold as the Chrysler Ypsilon. It is sold in Morocco and Israel through the Fiat dealer network. In 2012 it began selling in Japan under the Chrysler brand at Yanase Co., Ltd. Japanese dealerships. It wasn't exported to the US in order to avoid competition with the Fiat 500, which is produced at Chrysler's Toluca plant in Mexico.

=== Special edition ===
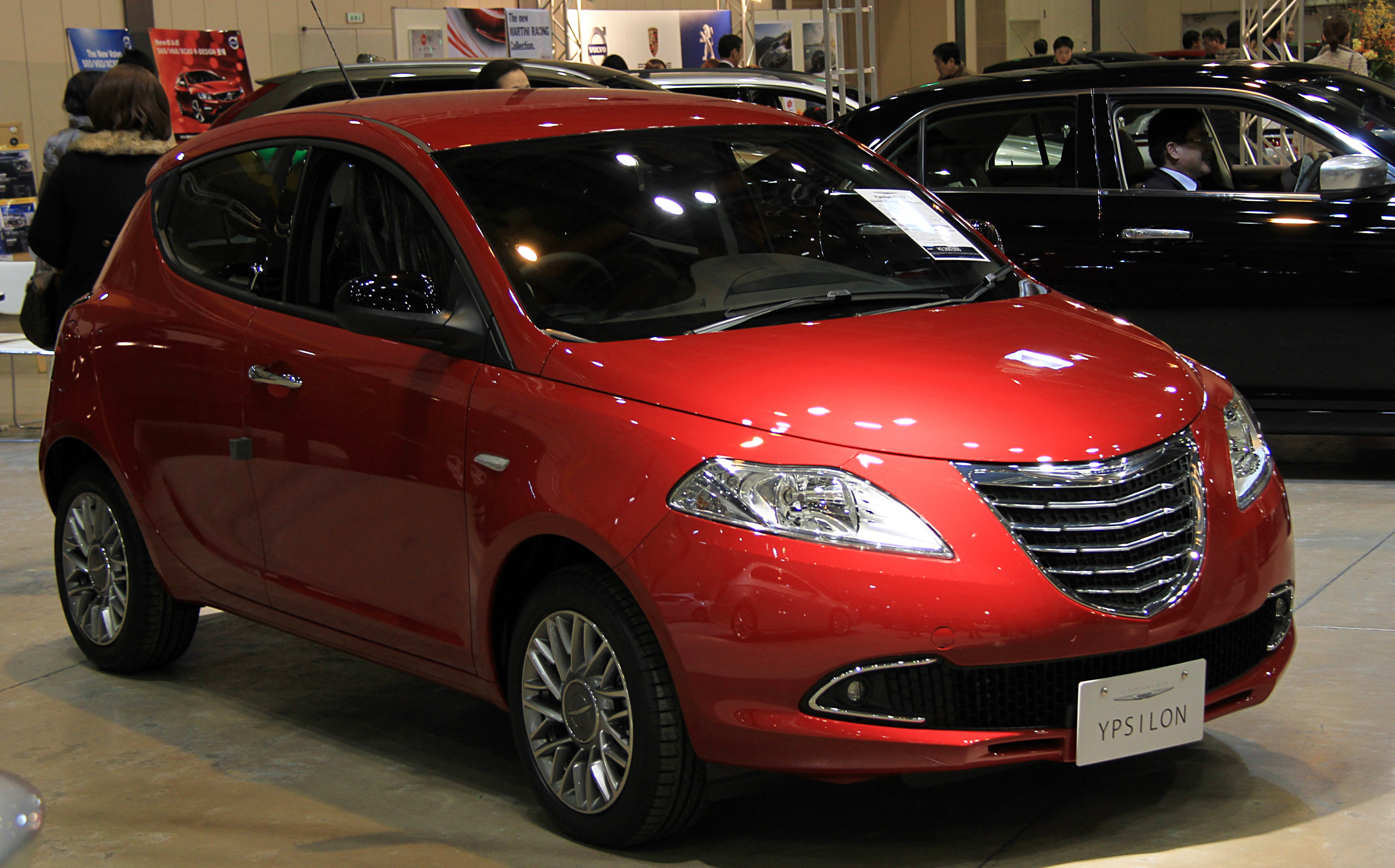
Chrysler Ypsilon in Japan

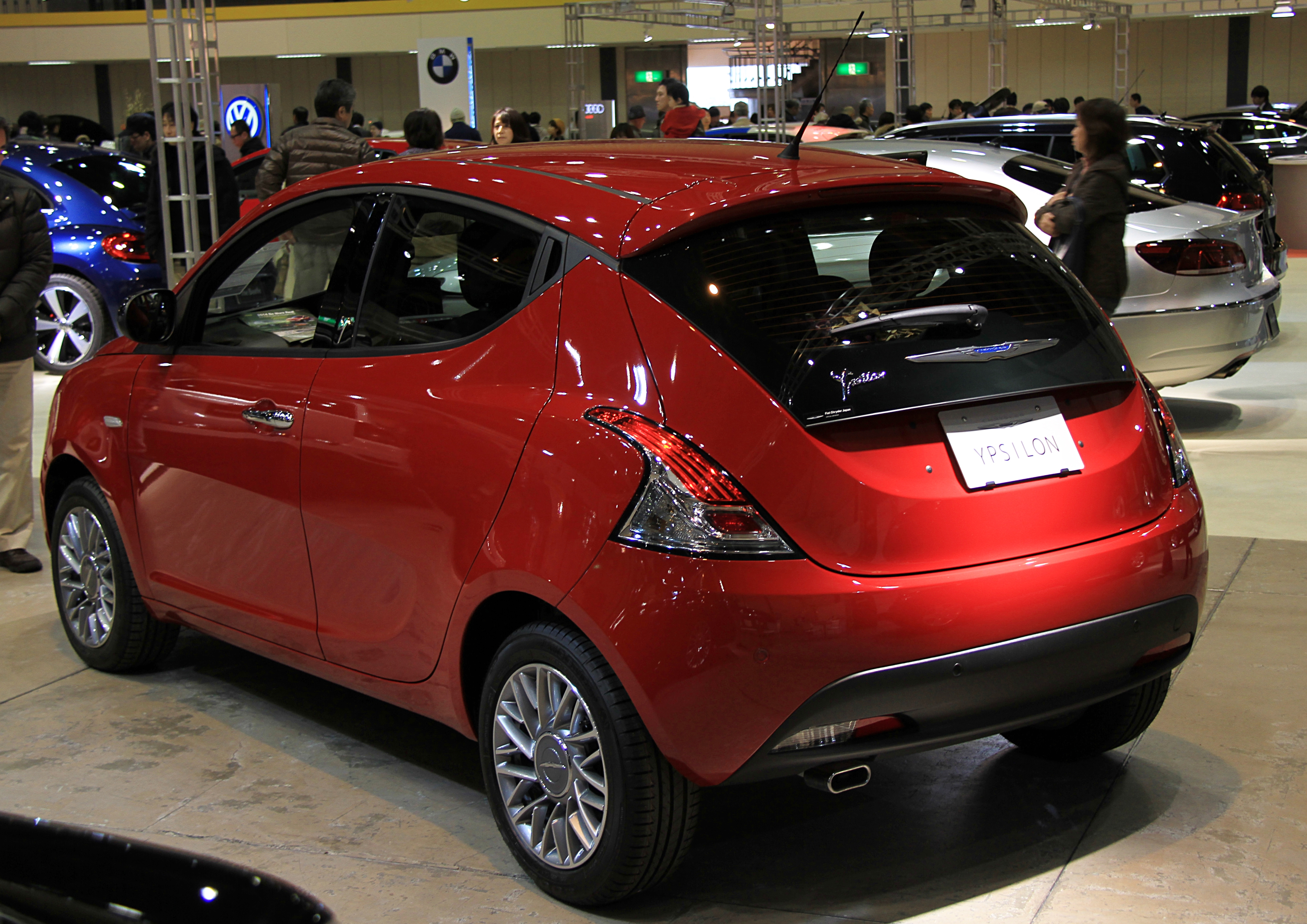
Chrysler Ypsilon in Japan (Rear)

At the 2011 Frankfurt Motor Show, Lancia debuted Ypsilon Diamond concept cars, which anticipated the release of a luxury model. The Diamond features two-tone paint with a top layer called "eco-chrome" covering pillars, roof, hood, and mirrors. The lower part of the body is painted in Chiffon Blanc (a shimmering white). The interior is fully lined in leather and Alcantara with two-tone seats covered in Galuchat black bronze leather. Head restraints display the Y logo. The outside of the seats, dashboard and some door details are covered with Nubuck light-colored leather with shift knob made of transparent acrylic to get the diamond effect. The Ypsilon Diamond has remained a concept car only.

At the Bologna Motor Show in December 2011 Lancia presented the Ypsilon Black&Red, with special equipment proposed for young buyers, including special paint and hi-fi audio. Offered in 4 paint styles (Rosso Argilla, Nero Vulcano, Rosso Fiamma, and the bi-color Rosso Argilla with roof and hood in Nero Vulcano) the interior offers the same color as the body with alternation of black and red. The Ypsilon Black&Red is sold in most markets (including UK and Ireland) with 1.2 Fire petrol engine, 0.9 TwinAir Turbo and 1.3 Multijet diesel.

=== Engines ===
The engine range consists of the 1.2 L eight-valve Fire petrol capable of 69 PS (51 kW; 68 hp), already present on the previous version and coupled to a 5-speed manual gearbox. A new option is the 0.9 L TwinAir two-cylinder with turbocharger capable of 85 PS (63 kW; 84 hp) and with Multiair. The 0.9 L TwinAir has emissions of 99 g/km of CO_{2} in the version with 5-speed manual transmission while the version with a DFN (Dolce Far Niente) automatic 5-speed transmission has emissions down to 97 g/km of CO_{2}. The Ypsilon 0.9 L TwinAir has a claimed consumption of 23.8-24.4 km/L. The diesel engine is the 1.3 L Multijet 16 valve 95 PS (70 kW; 94 hp) with a DPF capable of emitting 99 g/km of CO_{2} and is mated to a 5-speed manual transmission. The diesel version has a claimed consumption of 26.3 km/L.

==== Petrol ====
- 1.2 8V 69 PS (51 kW; 68 hp) (from 2011 to August 2020)
- 1.2 8V GPL 69 PS (51 kW; 68 hp) (Liquefied Petroleum Gas + petrol, from June 2011 to September 2024)
- 0.9 TwinAir 85 PS (63 kW; 84 hp) (from 2011 to August 2018)
- 0.9 TwinAir CNG 80 PS (59 kW; 79 hp) (Compressed Natural Gas + petrol, from January 2013 to January 2023)

==== Diesel ====
- 1.3 16V Multijet 95 PS (70 kW; 94 hp) (from 2011 to August 2018)

==== Hybrid ====
- 1.0 12V GSE FireFly BSG 69 PS (51 kW; 68 hp) (from March 2020 to September 2024)

=== 2015 facelift ===
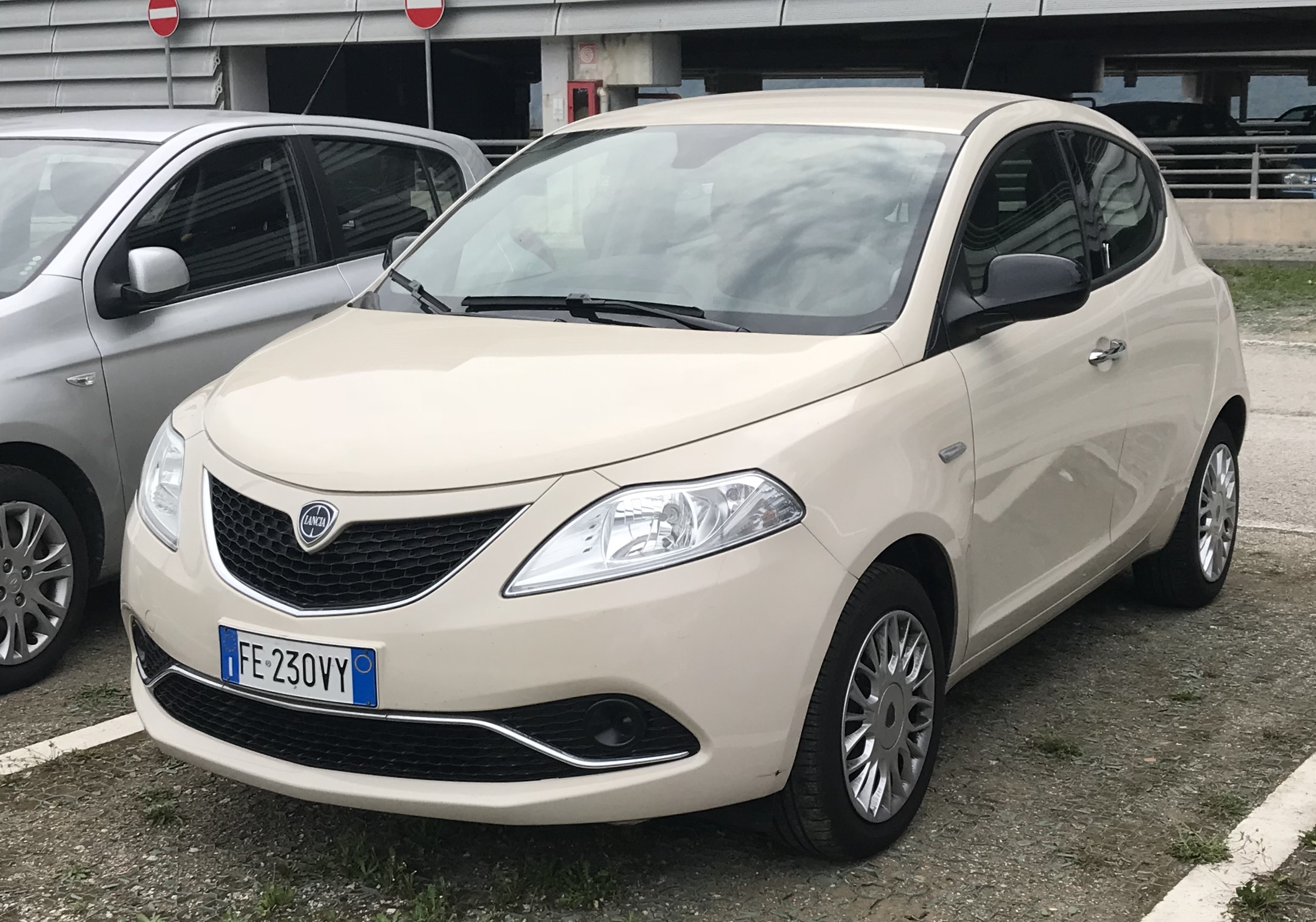
2018 Lancia Ypsilon 1.2 facelift

Premiered at Frankfurt International Salon, the new Ypsilon brings a redesigned front end with a different lower bumper, featuring a horizontal bar, and new, wider, grille. Available will be two new colours: Blu di Blu, a classic Lancia tone, and Ivory Chic aimed at modern trends. All engines meet Euro 6 emission standards with Ecochic versions including LPG or methane fuelled. Inside, the UConnect infotainment system with a 5-inch LCD touch screen debuts, while the basic versions introduce a new DAB radio. New seat covers also make their debut. In September 2018 the engines were re-homologated according to Euro 6D-Temp regulations in the new WLTP cycle. The 1.3 Multijet diesel engine goes out of production following low sales.

=== Ypsilon EcoChic Hybrid ===
In March 2020 Lancia introduces the Ypsilon EcoChic Hybrid powered by the GSE FireFly 1.0 L, three-cylinder gasoline engine with an output of 70 metric horsepower (51 kW; 69 hp), coupled to a 12-volt BSG (belt-integrated starter generator) electric motor.

The 3.6 kW (5 hp) electric motor draws power from a small 0.13 kWh lithium battery and the vehicle should reduce fuel consumption and emission by as much as 24 percent when compared to its non-hybrid counterpart. The Ypsilon Hybrid has a new 6-speed manual transmission and is homologated Euro 6D-Final.

=== All versions ===
- Lancia Ypsilon Silver (2011)
- Lancia Ypsilon Gold (2011)
- Lancia Ypsilon Platinum (2011)
- Lancia Ypsilon Ecochic LPG (In Italy: Ecochic GPL) (2011)
- Lancia Ypsilon Black&Red (2011)
- Lancia Ypsilon Black&Grey (2011)
- Lancia Ypsilon Ecochic CNG (In Italy: Ecochic Metano) (2013)
- Lancia Ypsilon Elefantino (Pink Elefantino) (2013)
- Lancia Ypsilon S Momodesign (2013)
- Lancia Ypsilon Park in Style (2013)
- Lancia Ypsilon Elefantino (Lime, Coconut, Watermelon Elefantino) (2014)
- Lancia Ypsilon Elle (2014)
- Lancia Ypsilon 30th Anniversary (2015)
- Lancia Ypsilon Mya (2016)
- Lancia Ypsilon Unyca (2017)
- Lancia Ypsilon Elefantino Blu (2018)
- Lancia Ypsilon Black and Noir (2019)
- Lancia Ypsilon Monogram (2019)
- Lancia Ypsilon Hybrid EcoChic Silver (2020)
- Lancia Ypsilon Hybrid EcoChic Gold (2020)
- Lancia Ypsilon Hybrid EcoChic Maryne (2020)
- Lancia Ypsilon Alberta Ferretti (2021)

=== Safety ===
The Ypsilon was awarded 2 stars in the Euro NCAP crash test in 2015.

=== 2021 facelift ===
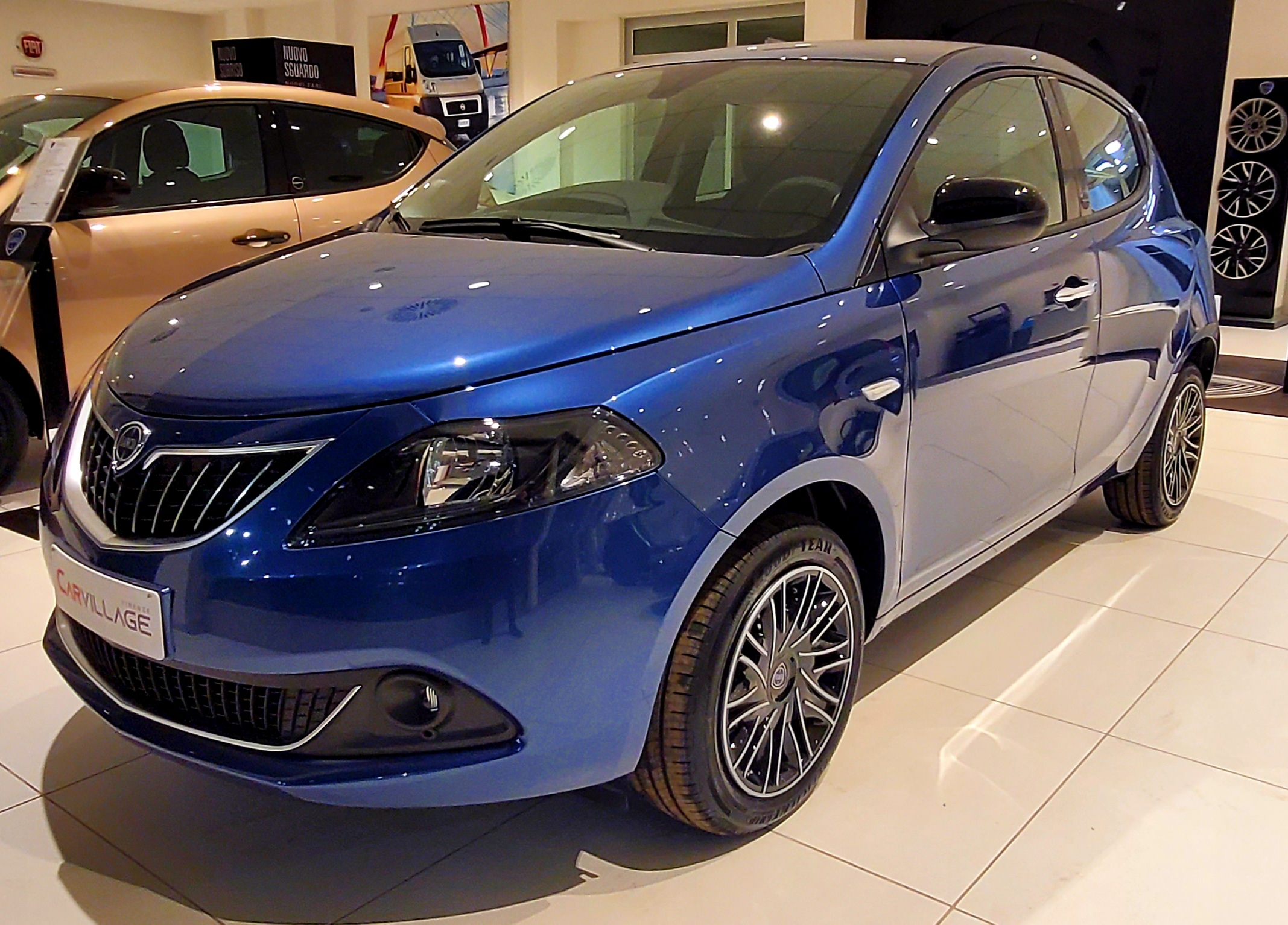
Lancia Ypsilon Blu Elegante (second facelift)

In 2021 Stellantis gave the car a grille with vertical strips according to the Lancia tradition and updated headlights with new daytime running lights. It was also announced that the maker will now be considered a premium car maker and will be part of the Stellantis premium pool sharing parts with DS Automobiles and Alfa Romeo.

== Fourth generation (2024) ==
Fourth generation
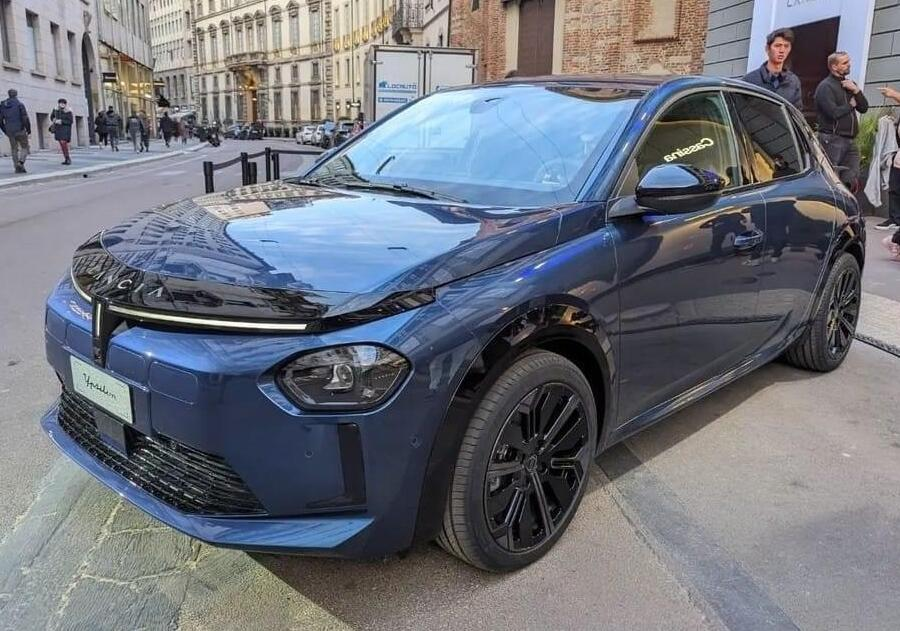

Overview
- Model code: Type L21
- Production: 2024–present
- Assembly: Spain: Zaragoza (Opel)
- Designer: Emanuele Torrassorri

Body and chassis
- Body style: 5-door hatchback
- Layout: Front-engine, front-wheel-drive; Front-motor, front-wheel-drive (EV)
- Platform: Common Modular
- Related: Peugeot 208 II; Opel Corsa F; Jeep Avenger; Fiat 600; Alfa Romeo Junior; Peugeot 2008 II; Opel Mokka B; DS 3 Crossback

Powertrain
- Engine: Petrol: 1.2 THP (EB2LTED) I3 turbo; Petrol Hybrid: 1.2 THP (EB2LTEDH2) I3 turbo Mild-Hybrid 48v
- Electric motor: 28 hp Motor Integrated into the transmission (hybrid); 400 V front-mounted electric motor (EV)
- Power output: 74 kW (99 hp; 101 PS) (1.2 MHEV; 2024-2025); 82 kW (110 hp; 111 PS) (1.2 MHEV; 2025-); 74kW (99 hp; 100 PS) (1.2 Petrol); 115 kW (154 hp; 156 PS) (EV); 207 kW (278 hp; 281 PS) (Ypsilon HF EV)
- Transmission: 6-speed e-DCT; 6-speed manual
- Hybrid drivetrain: Mild-Hybrid 48v
- Battery: 0.43 KWh (Hybrid). 51 kWh (2024-2025) or 54 kWh (2025-) CATL Li-NMC (EV).
- Electric range: 403km (51kWh) or 425km (54kWh) WLTP

Dimensions
- Wheelbase: 2,540 mm (100.0 in)
- Length: 4,080 mm (160.6 in)
- Width: 1,768 mm (69.6 in) 1,787 mm (70.4 in) (HF)
- Height: 1,440 mm (56.7 in) 1,420 mm (55.9 in) (HF)
- Curb weight: 1,282–1,584 kg (2,826–3,492 lb)

The fourth-generation Ypsilon is the first new model to be produced by Lancia since 2011 and the first electric model from Lancia. It was revealed in a set of images on 2 February 2024, with more details released on 14 February 2024 at Lancia's headquarters in Milan. It is based on the CMP / eCMP platform, sharing multiple parts with the Peugeot 208 II and the Opel Corsa F.

The Ypsilon is the first Lancia production vehicle to adopt their Pu+Ra Design language ('Pu+Ra' is a combination of ‘pure’ and ‘radical’) and the brand's new logo, which were both previewed from the Pu+Ra HPE concept car in 2023. The Ypsilon features an illuminated version of the historic front grille with three light rays, round headlights and taillights that both feature a letter Y motif, a Lancia badge on the C-Pillar and the Ypsilon badge on the rear hatch, having handwritten characters inspired by historic Lancia models. The ICE models are distinguished from the electric models, with four additional cooling intakes on the front fascia (which are blanked out on the electric model) and a single exhaust pipe on the rear diffuser.

The Ypsilon is the first Lancia model to debut with S.A.L.A. (Sound Air Light Augmentation) infotainment system with virtual assissant, it has a multifunctional "tavolino" table with a wireless charging pad and a leather panel embossed with the Cassina special edition logo first seen in a production vehicle, and the only car in its segment to be equipped Level 2 Autonomous Driving safety package.

The fourth-generation Ypsilon marks the expansion of the Lancia brand in Europe. The brand was reintroduced to Belgium, Netherlands, Luxembourg, France and Spain in 2024, followed by planned reintroduction in Germany in 2025, however this has not happened as of 2026. These countries are chosen in consideration of the popularity of Italian products, and the popularity of B-segment vehicles.

In 2026, a non-hybrid petrol version was introduced, called the Ypsilon Turbo 100, with a 1.2L turbocharged engine and 6-speed manual transmission.

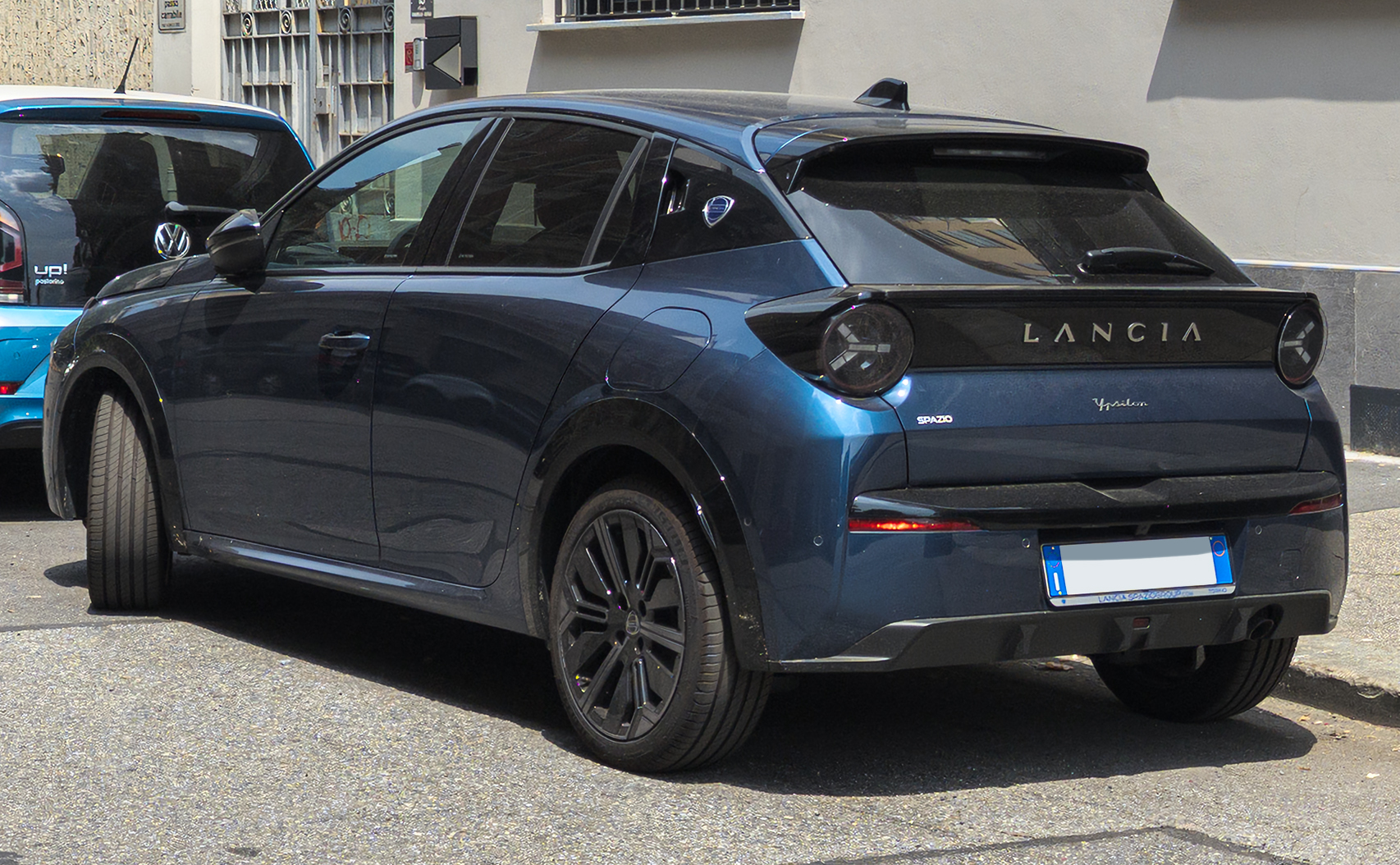
Rear view

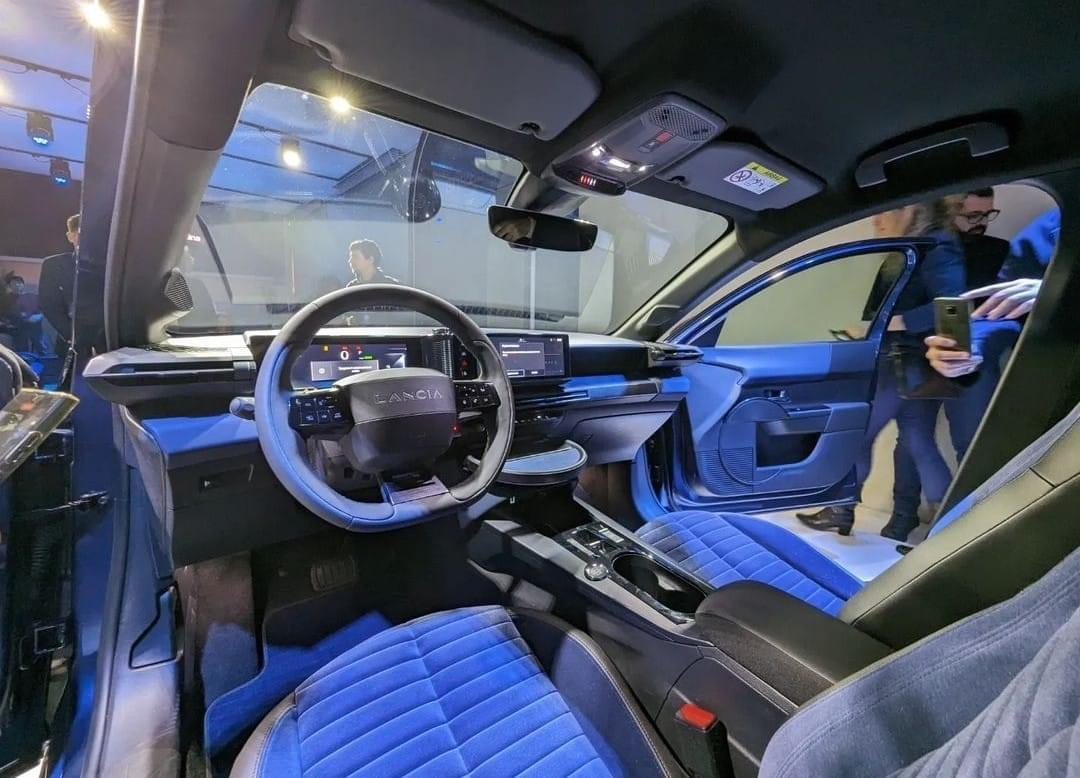
Interior

=== Ypsilon Edizione Limitata Cassina ===
The Lancia Ypsilon Edizione Limitata Cassina is a limited production version of the Ypsilon codeveloped between Lancia and Italian high-end furniture manufacturer Cassina S.p.A. Production of the model is capped at 1,906 units, the amount referencing Lancia's foundation in 1906.

=== Ypsilon HF ===
In May 2025, the Ypsilon HF(HF stands for 'High Fidelity') was revealed, a high-performance version of the regular Ypsilon. The HF model has a front-mounted electric motor producing 206 kW (280 PS; 276 hp). Other changes include a wider wheel track, limited slip differential, bigger brakes from Alcon, bucket seats, and more aggressive styled bumpers. The introduction to the international press took place in June 2025 and the first cars were delivered to customers in December. Stellantis announced they will also produce a new Peugeot 208 GTi which will be based on the Ypsilon HF.

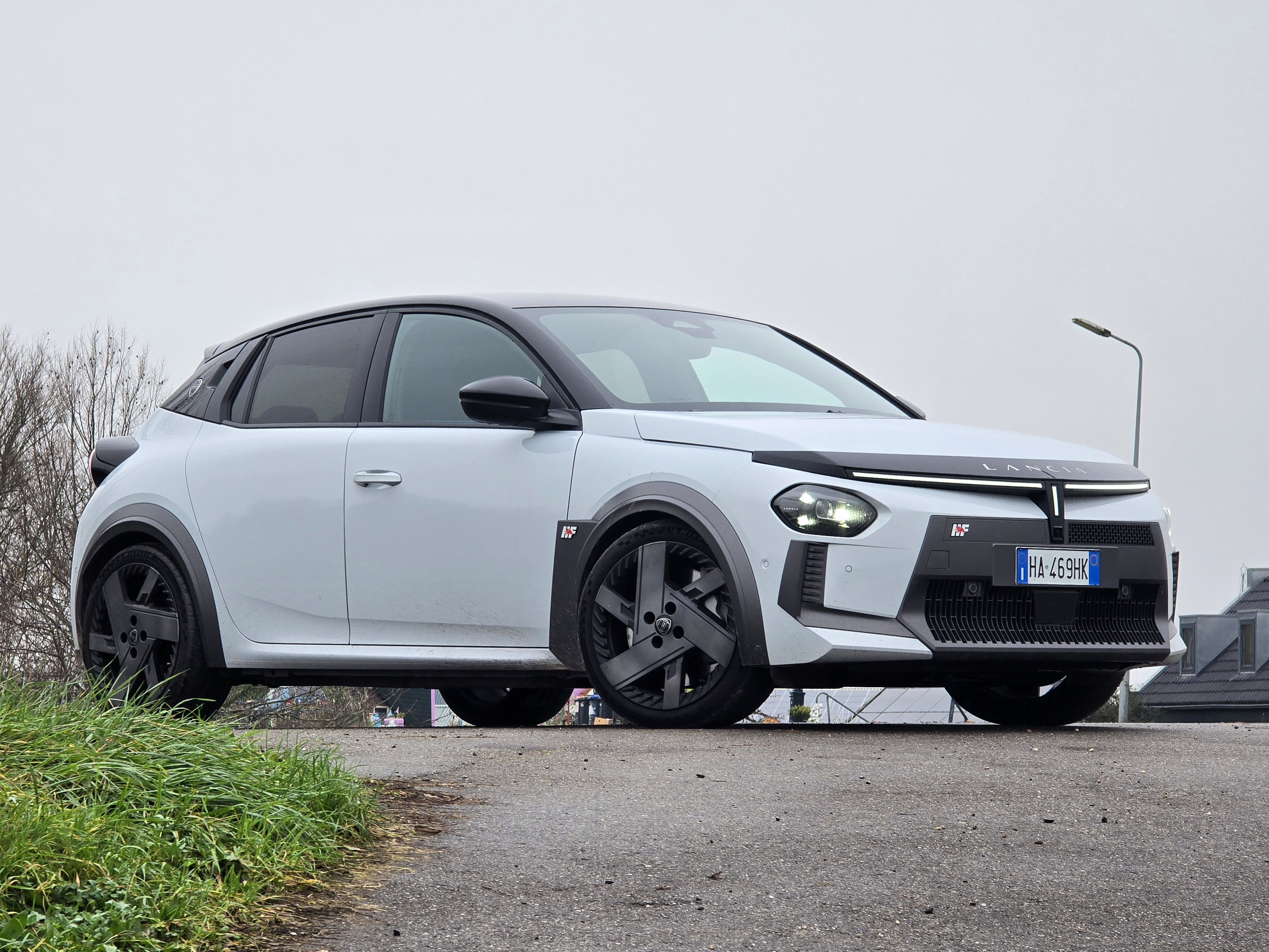
HF front view

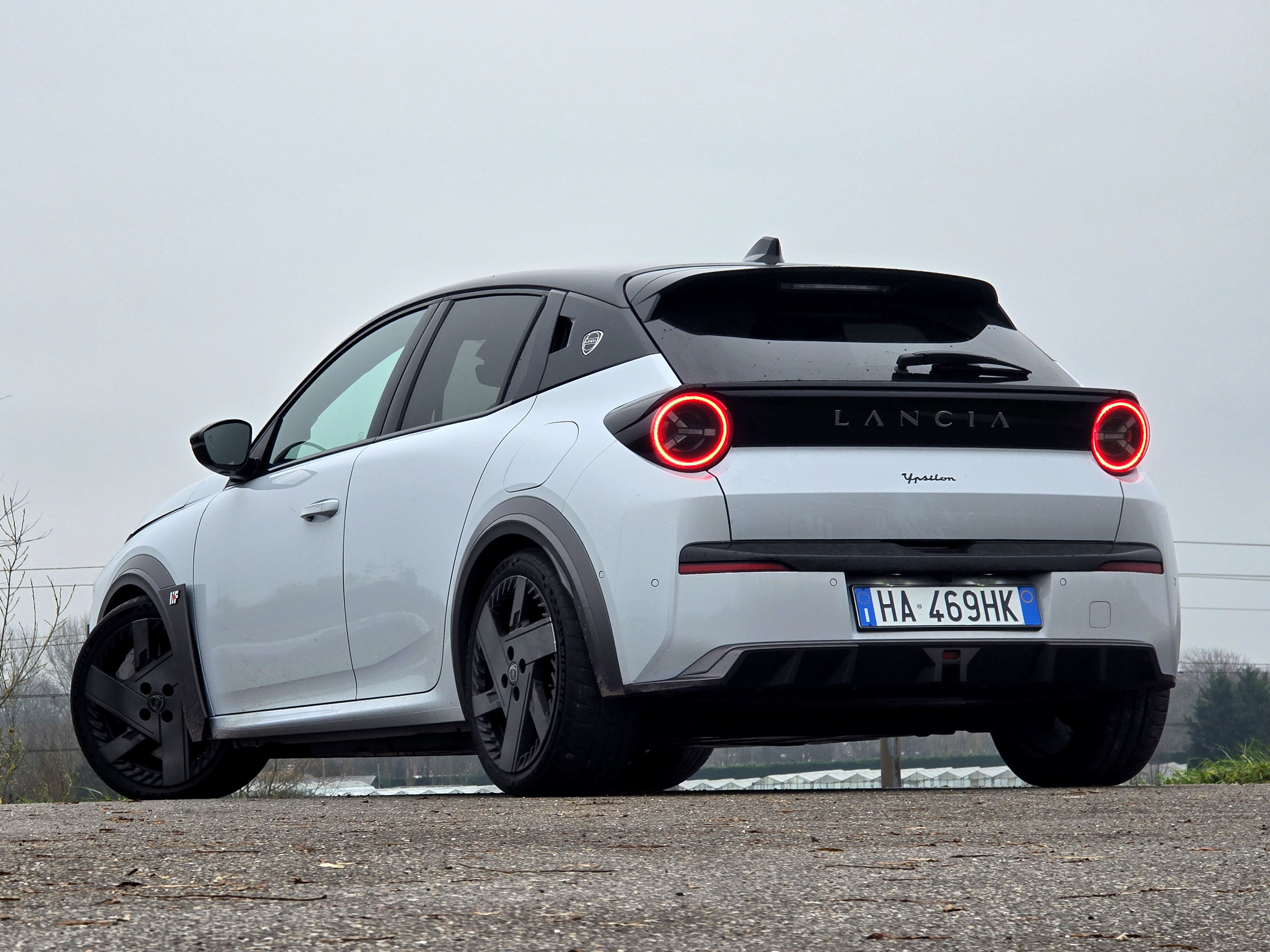
HF rear view

HF bucket seats

== Motorsport ==
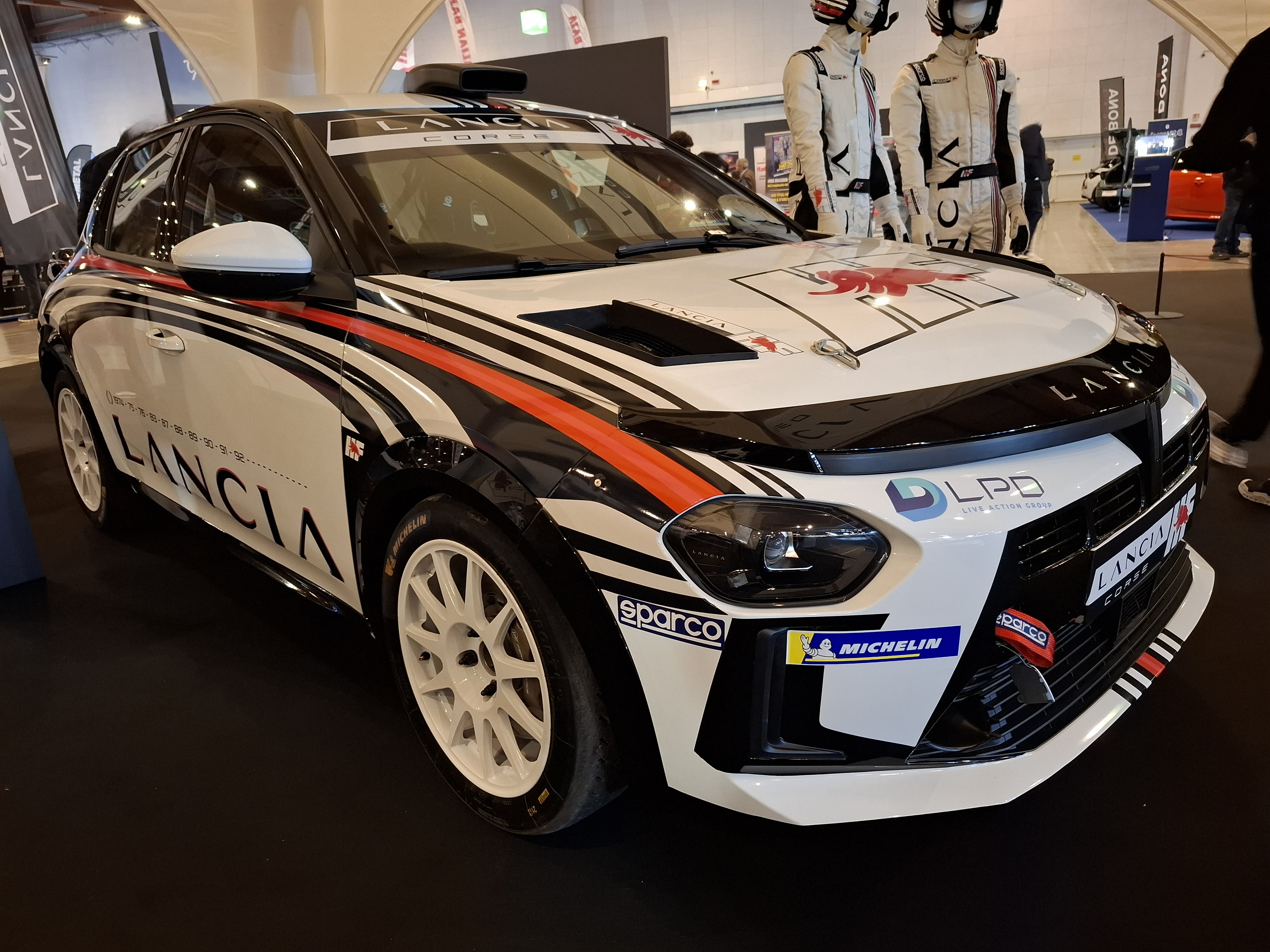
Lancia Ypsilon Rally4 HF at Racing Meeting, Fiera di Vicenza in 2026

The car was developed into two rally cars, Ypsilon Rally4 HF for the Group Rally4 in 2024 and Ypsilon Rally2 HF Integrale for the Group Rally2 in 2025. The Ypsilon Rally2 car would be used to contest the WRC2 championship, marking Lancia's return to the World Rally Championship after decades.
