= HP ScanJet =

Series of image scanners by HP

ScanJet
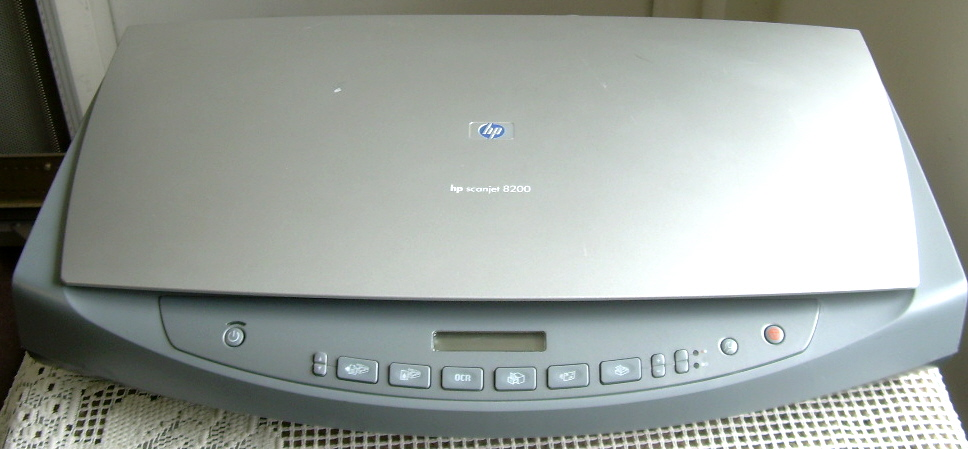
- ScanJet 8200
- Manufacturer: Hewlett-Packard (1987–2015); HP Inc. (since 2015)
- Introduced: March 2, 1987; 39 years ago
- Type: Image scanner (flatbed, sheetfed)
- Connection: SCSI; parallel; USB
- Dots per inch: 300–4800

ScanJet is a line of desktop flatbed and sheetfed image scanners originally sold by Hewlett-Packard (HP), later HP Inc., since 1987. It was the first commercially widespread image scanner on the market, as well as one of the first scanners aimed at the small office/home office market. It was originally designed to complement the company's LaserJet series of laser printers and allowed HP to compete in the burgeoning desktop publishing market of the 1980s.

The grayscale-only ScanJet Plus, co-developed with Canon and released in 1989, was a massive commercial success and had a wide influence in scanner design. For almost a decade at the low end of the market, the ScanJet Plus was a de facto standard for the specifications of scanner hardware. Starting in 1991, models of ScanJet were released that could scan in full color.

Updates to the ScanJet line have been sporadic since the 2010s.

== Models ==
=== 1st generation ===
Hewlett-Packard (HP) developed the first ScanJet in the mid-1980s at their printer division in Boise, Idaho. The ScanJet was released on March 2, 1987. It was designed to compliment their LaserJet series, which was the first commercially successful line of laser printers ever released; it was introduced in 1984 and also developed at Boise. The ScanJet was developed to round out the company's desktop publishing products; desktop publishing was a nascent industry at the time, for which HP had a printing device, the LaserJet, but no imaging device to pair with it.

The original ScanJet has a 8.5-by-13-inch platen and is capable of scanning at a maximum resolution of 300 dpi in 4-bit grayscale (16 shades of gray). The original ScanJet has an internal raster image processor (RIP), controlled by software, capable of outputting the scan to the computer in raw 4-bit grayscale, in halftone dither, or in 1-bit monochrome. HP sold the original ScanJet with an optional automatic document feeder (ADF) attachment, intended for scanning multiple-page documents rapidly; the ADF attachment supports up to legal-sized documents. Customers were forced to buy a proprietary interface card that allowed the ScanJet to connect to an IBM PC or compatible desktop computer for nearly US$500 extra. HP initially targeted the ScanJet for the PC platform only, but in June 1988, the company released driver software and an application suite for the Macintosh platform supporting the ScanJet.

=== ScanJet Plus ===
The original ScanJet sold very well for HP, with PC Week calling it a "mammoth succes[s]" six months after its initial release. By the beginning of 1988, the ScanJet had accounted 27 percent of all scanner sales in terms of dollar volume, per Gartner Dataquest. Canon's IX-12 had heretofore been the most popular scanner for the PC platform, but by 1989 the ScanJet had caught up in terms of sales and third-party software support. That year, Canon and HP collaborated on the design for the follow-up ScanJet Plus, released in February 1989. The scanning engine of the ScanJet Plus reused Canon's design for the IX-30F, while Hewlett-Packard designed the rest of the hardware as well as the support software. The ScanJet bumped the bit depth up to 8 bits, or 256 shades of gray, while retaining the 300-dpi maximum resolution of its predecessor. The ScanJet Plus supported bidirectional parallel communication, a standard for parallel communication introduced with the IBM PS/2 in 1987; it sold with either an ISA interface card for standard PCs or a Micro Channel architecture (MCA) interface card for the PS/2. Like the original ScanJet, the ScanJet Plus also sold with an optional ADF attachment.

The ScanJet Plus had exceptional market uptake and was widely praised in the technology press. It was the first mass-marketed grayscale scanner for desktop computers and was influential in bringing the cost of the average scanner down from the multiple thousands of dollars to the sub-$2000 range. By 1991, the ScanJet Plus had become a de facto standard for scanner hardware, with new competing scanners boasting compatibility with the ScanJet Plus (in terms of feature set and API commands sent to DOS and Windows software). ScanJet Plus–compatibility would remain the lowest-common denominator for numerous scanners on the market for nearly a decade, until the maturation of the TWAIN API for scanners occurred in the late 1990s. Even by 1996, the ScanJet Plus remained popular on the reseller market.

=== ScanJet IIc, IIcx ===
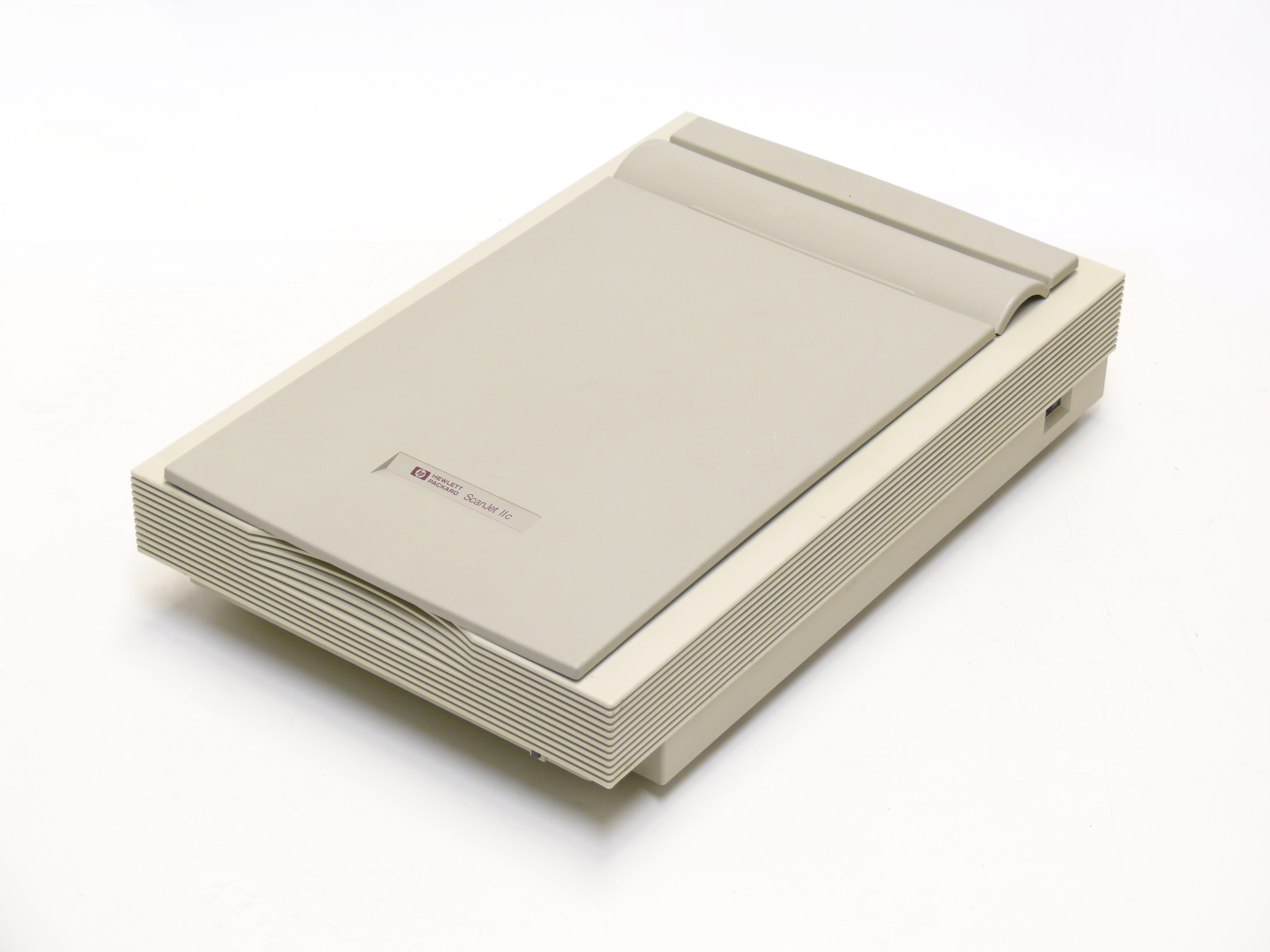
ScanJet IIc with its lid closed. The ScanJet IIc was the first ScanJet capable of scanning in color.

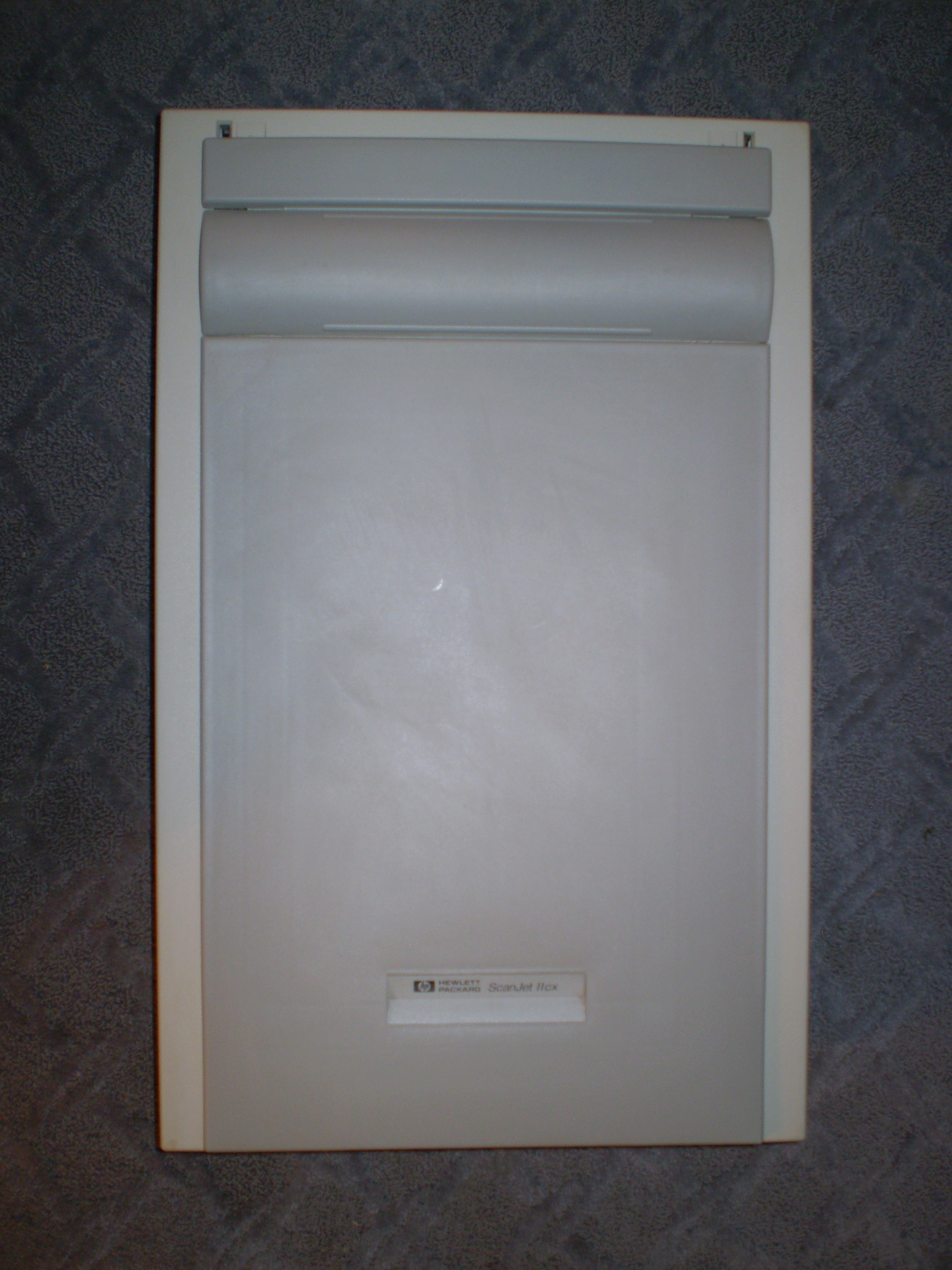
Top view of a ScanJet IIcx

In 1990, HP moved research and development of the ScanJet from Boise to Greeley, Colorado. There, the company developed the ScanJet IIc, the first ScanJet capable of scanning in color, released in August 1991. The ScanJet IIc is capable of scanning up to 24-bit color (about 16.7 million colors) at 400 dpi and has a platen capable of scanning up to legal paper–sized documents. The ScanJet IIc natively supports both the Mac and the PC and has connectors for both 25-pin and 50-pin SCSI interfaces. The scanner's RIP is capable of outputing full 24-bit color to the computer, or it can output 1-bit monochrome, 8-bit grayscale, spot color, 8-bit color, and halftones in both color and monochrome. HP sold an optional ADF for the ScanJet IIc.

Unlike the ScanJet Plus, the ScanJet IIc's scanning engine, as well as its charge-coupled device (CCD) imaging sensor, were designed entirely in-house at HP by a team of dozens. The ScanJet IIc uses an imaging sensor with three linear CCDs to scan a color image in one pass, illuminating the page with two fluorescent tube lamps. Each CCD receives red, green, and blue color information separately using an optical focusing system that focuses the illuminated page onto two dichroic filters, which splits the image into the three color components that are read separately by each of the CCDs. The CCDs are refreshed periodically to eliminate low-pass filtering at the scanner's native 400 dpi, increasing vertical resolution. When scanning at lower resolutions, however, the sensor traverses the page at a faster rate, inducing a slight low-pass filter over the image (in an analog fashion) and eliminating aliasing effects on half-tone images, a beneficial side-effect when scanning halftone-printed originals. The simple linear interpolation of the ScanJet's RIP for producing scans in non-integer scalings of 400 dpi does produce aliasing artifacts when scanning certain halftone originals, however. In addition, when scanning at resolutions higher than 150 dpi, the ScanJet IIc may send data up to 600 KB per second, which on contemporaneous personal computers was a data rate too fast for their disk buffers to handle. Thus, HP designed the ScanJet IIC's stepper motor drive system to occasionally stop the imaging sensor in place and ratchet it back several millimeters to allow for the disk buffer to clear and the scan to restart. The ratcheting motion prevents gaps and other distortions in the final output by accounting for the inertia of the image sensor suddenly stopping in place.

In November 1993, HP introduced the ScanJet IIcx, their replacement for the IIc, featuring a faster stepper motor drive assembly that scans images in grayscale mode at nearly twice the speed of the IIc; the speed of color scans remains the same, however. It was also HP's first ScanJet to ship with an optional transparency adapter, used for scanning slides and film negatives. HP offered the same optional ADF of the IIc for the IIcx; the transparency adapter option was however exclusive to the IIcx and is not backwards-compatible with older ScanJets.

=== ScanJet IIp, 3p ===
In March 1992, HP introduced the ScanJet IIp, a compact and lower-cost version of the ScanJet Plus that served as its direct replacement. It was one of the first scanners on the market to support the TWAIN API, for which Hewlett-Packard was a principal author (as part of the TWAIN Working Group). Like the ScanJet Plus, the ScanJet IIp scans up to 300 dpi natively at up to 8-bit grayscale; alternatively it can output 600 dpi, interpolated from 300 dpi. However, its platen is slightly smaller than the ScanJet Plus', at 8.5 by 11.7 inches, in order to accommodate the smaller chassis. HP bundled the ScanJet IIp with a trial version of Caere's OmniPage, an optical character recognition (OCR) software package. HP collaborated with Caere to fine-tune OmniPage to support HP's new AccuPage algorithms for aiding in OCR. AccuPage comprised an adaptive thresholding filter for improved text detection and a model for detecting columns and tabular data, ensuring the proper flow of text in the resulting OCR text file. AccuPage was later backported to the ScanJet IIc and made an open standard for other OCR vendors to license. In October 1994, HP replaced the ScanJet IIp with the ScanJet 3p, capable of scanning twice as fast as the ScanJet IIp at the same resolutions. An optional ADF was available for both the IIp and the 3p.

=== ScanJet 3c, 4c, 4p ===
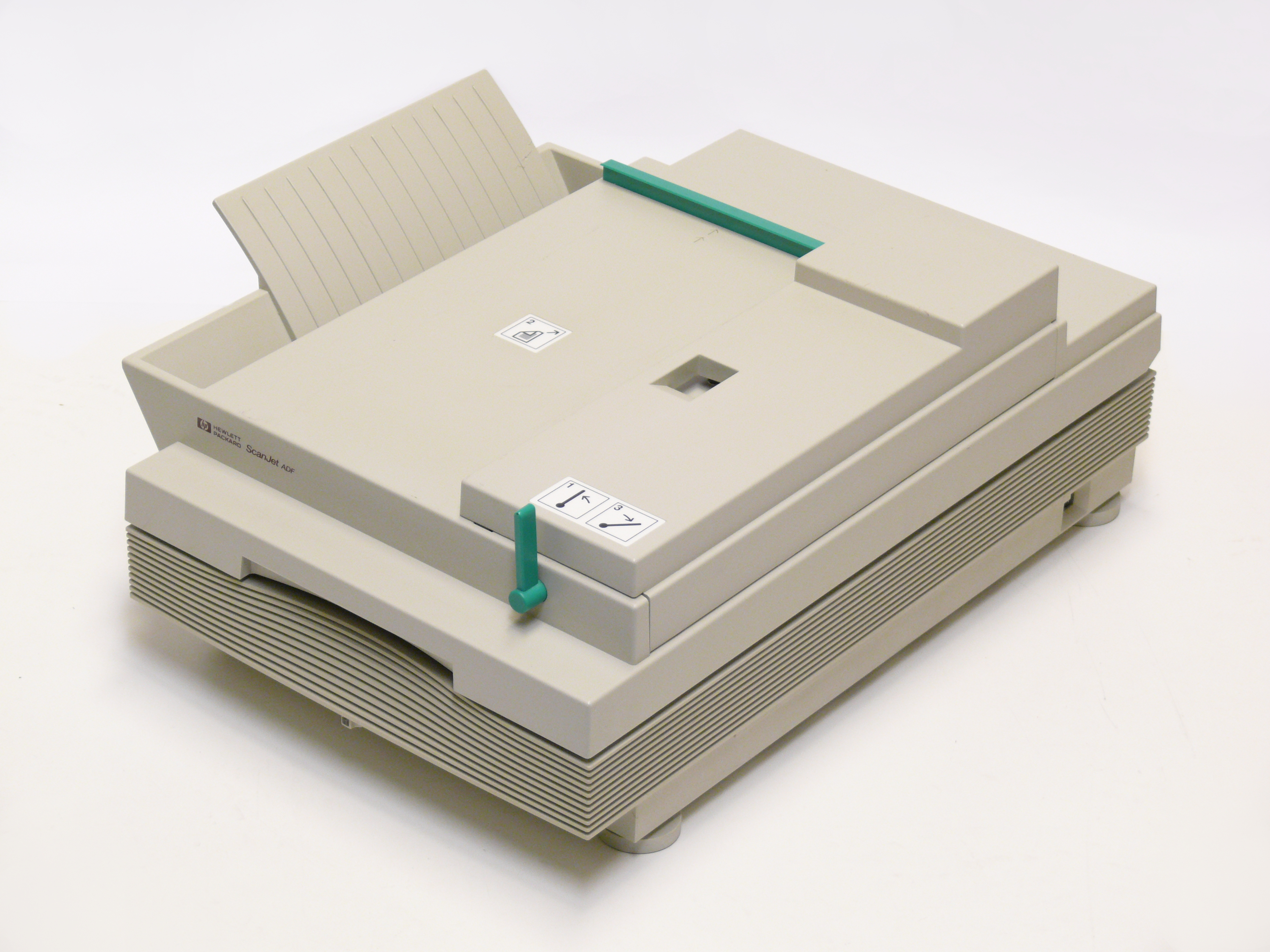
ScanJet 4c with the optional automatic document feeder (ADF)

HP replaced the ScanJet IIcx with the ScanJet 3c in April 1995. The ScanJet 3c doubled the scanning speed over the ScanJet IIcx while boosting the maximum color bit depth to 30 bits (over 1 billion colors) and the maximum grayscale bit depth to 10 bits (1024 shades of gray). This boost in bit depth aids in post-processing of images; for example, it allows the user to pull out detail from shadows in dark photographic prints while reducing banding. It was the cheapest scanner on the market to scan in 30-bit color at the time of its release. The ScanJet 3c also increased the maximum native resolution of the scanning element to 600 dpi. The ScanJet's hardware PDI is capable of upscaling the 600-dpi image to simulate up to 4800 dpi. Like the IIcx, the ScanJet 3c supports an aftermarket ADF and transparency adapter. The ScanJet 3c received a minor update in the form of the ScanJet 4c in November 1995. It was virtually identical to the 3c, with the bundled DeskScan II scanner control and raster editor application updated for greater Windows 95 support. A cost-reduced version of the ScanJet 4c, the ScanJet 4p, was released in March 1996. It was limited to a maximum resolution of 300 dpi and a maximum color bit depth of 24 bits. The ScanJet 4c was sold as the ScanJet 4cse at retailers.

Development of the ScanJet 3c was an involved process, requiring tweaking the sizes of each of the three-strip CCD sensor to correct for chromatic aberration caused by uneven path lengths of the filtered red, green, and blue beams of light as they bounce off the mirrors of the optical assembly. HP also had to design and manufacture a bespoke fluorescent tube with three specific phosphors that radiate even, controlled amounts of red, green, and blue light. Late in the development of the 3c, the development team was forced to add a large metal plate to the bottom of the scanner acting as a charge sink to eliminate electrostatic discharge that was causing the scanner's SCSI bus to crash and reset.

=== ScanJet 4s, 4si, 5s ===
Along with the ScanJet 4c, HP also introduced the ScanJet 4s and the ScanJet 4si in November 1995. These models of ScanJet were HP's first standalone sheetfed scanners that the company had released. The ScanJet 4s was a rebadge of Visioneer's PaperPort scanner, which was a low-cost, slimline sheetfed unit. The ScanJet 4s had a limited feature set compared to the PaperPort but was less expensive. The ScanJet 4si on the other hand was an original HP design. It was a networked scanner, designed to plug into an Ethernet or Token Ring network to send scans across a local area network through a NetWare server. The ScanJet 4si had a front-panel LCD for sending scans directly to a system on the network.

In April 1997, HP released the successor to the ScanJet 4s, the ScanJet 5s, which was designed by HP from the ground-up. Allegedly, HP was unhappy with the original PaperPort's design and grew weary of Visioneer's slow efforts to design a successor model on which HP could base the design of the ScanJet 5s, so HP decided to design it themselves. It was HP's first color sheetfed scanner and could scan documents up to 300 dpi optically (600 dpi interpolated) in 24-bit color. PC Magazine reviewed the ScanJet 5s negatively, writing that, "Unfortunately, [HP's] first entry in the color sheet-fed scanner market ... is slow and noisy", outputting mediocre scans.

=== ScanJet 5p ===
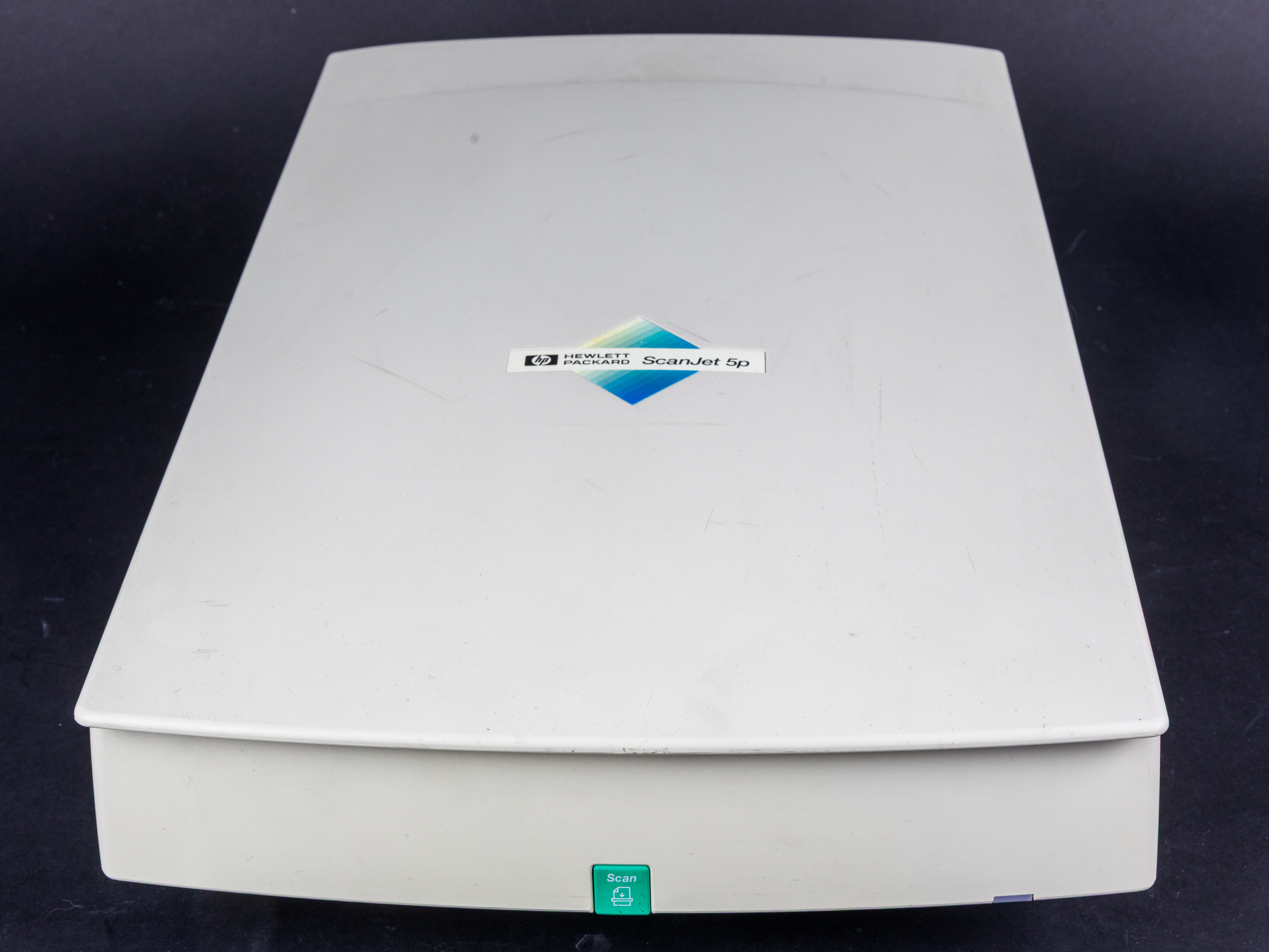
ScanJet 5p

External videos
- ScanJet 5p playing "Ode to Joy" on YouTube (by Matej Srebernjak)

HP replaced the ScanJet 4p with the ScanJet 5p (sold as the ScanJet 5pse at retailers) in January 1997. It was sold alongside the ScanJet 4c as a budget offering. To that end, the ScanJet 5p was only capable of scanning up to 300 dpi and up to 24-bit color, exactly like its predecessor. The ScanJet 5p featured a redesigned chassis, with the addition of a scan button toward the front of the case that launches the bundled PictureScan software and can be set up to initiate a scan without further user intervention. HP did not offer an ADF or a transparency scanner as options for the ScanJet 5p, however, because of its budget stature.

The ScanJet 5p originally shipped with a buggy TWAIN driver that caused scans within certain image editors such as Photoshop to slow down dramatically compared to scans within HP's DeskJet software. The company later issued a patched driver on their website.

The ScanJet 5p contains a hardware Easter egg. On a cold power-on, holding down the scan button when the SCSI ID selector on the back is set to "0" will cause the ScanJet to play a rendition of Schiller's "Ode to Joy", by modulating the speed of the audible stepper motor drive to produce specific pitches.

=== Network ScanJet 5 ===
In November 1997, HP iterated on their ScanJet 4si design with the Network ScanJet 5, which connect directly to Ethernet routers (either 10BASE2, 10BASE-T, or 100BASE-T) and interface with servers running either NetWare or Windows NT Server. With a local interface comprising an LCD and a numeric keypad, the ScanJet can be controlled directly to send files to any computer on the network. If it is connected to a network capable of sending packet-switched faxes, the Network ScanJet 5 can act as a sort of fax machine, capable of sending documents to fax machines in the local area network or outside of it. However, it is incapable of receiving faxes directly; this still has to be done either through software on a computer system on the network or through an actual fax machine on the network.

=== ScanJet 6000 series ===
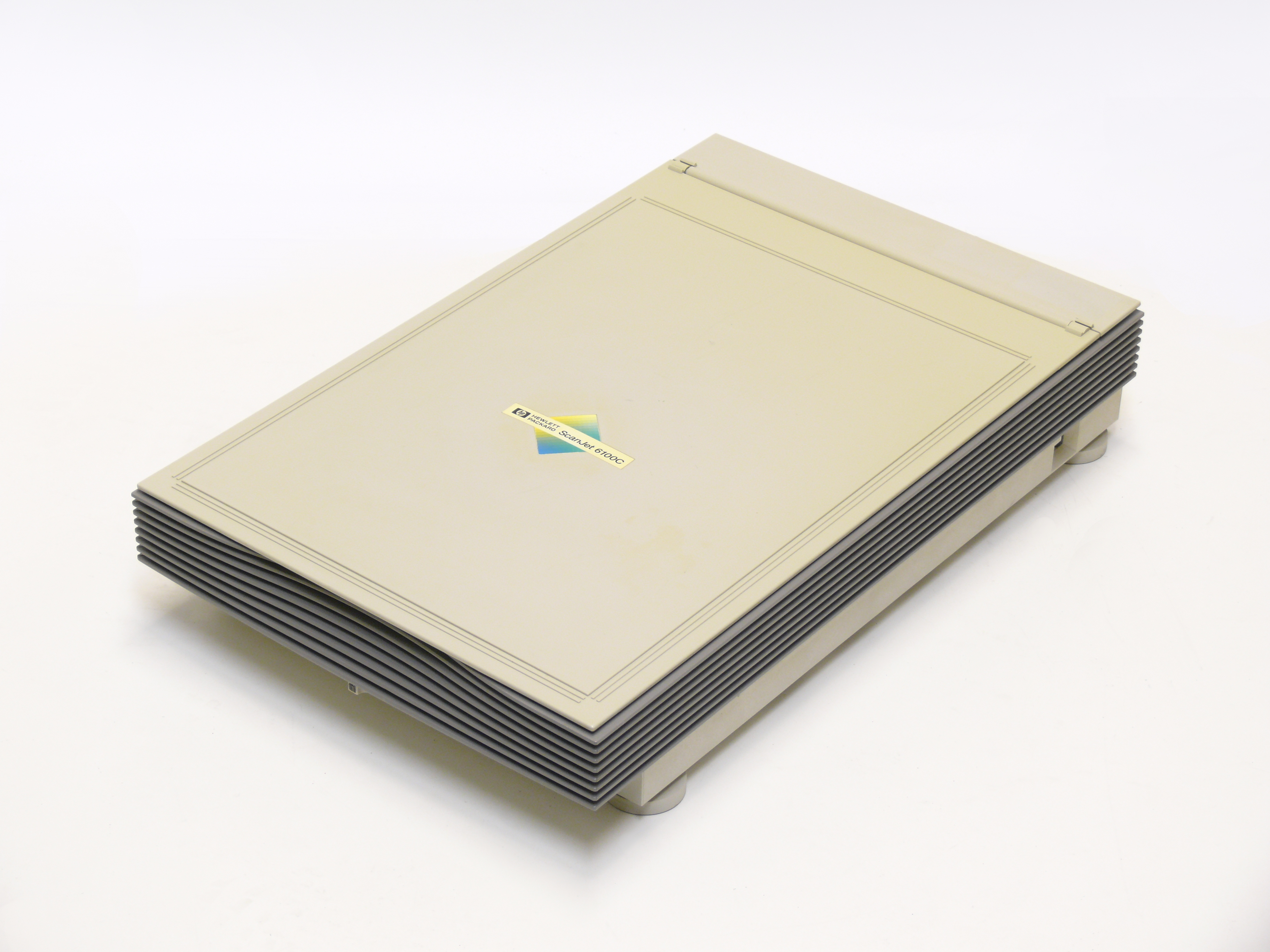
ScanJet 6100c

The ScanJet 6100c, released in August 1997, replaced the ScanJet 4c as HP's high-end flatbed scanner offering. Like the ScanJet 4c (and the ScanJet 3c before it), the ScanJet 6100c has a CCD imaging sensor that scans up to 30-bit color at up to 600 dpi optically. HP sold as optionals an ADF and a transparency adapter for the ScanJet 6100c. As a pack-in feature, HP bundled the ScanJet 6100c with a passive transparency adapter, as a free alternative to the transparency adapter. The device consists of a small, hollow, plastic triangular prism, with one of the congruent faces cut out to accommodate a single 35-mm slide and a mirror glued to one of the other congruent two faces from the inside. The light from the flatbed's lamp projects through the slide onto the mirror, which bounces back through the slide onto the imaging sensor. This system repurposes the scanner's built-in lamp as a backlight, necessary to scan transparencies on a flatbed.

HP replaced the ScanJet 6100c with the ScanJet 6200c in August 1998, which bumped the color depth to 36 bits and added USB connectivity. It was alternatively sold with an ADF built in as the ScanJet 6250c. The ScanJet 6200c was replaced in August 1999 with the ScanJet 6300c, which was alternatively sold as the 6350c with an ADF built-in and as the 6390c with the transparency adapter built-in. It was otherwise identical to the 6200c in terms of performance and quality.

=== ScanJet 5000 series ===
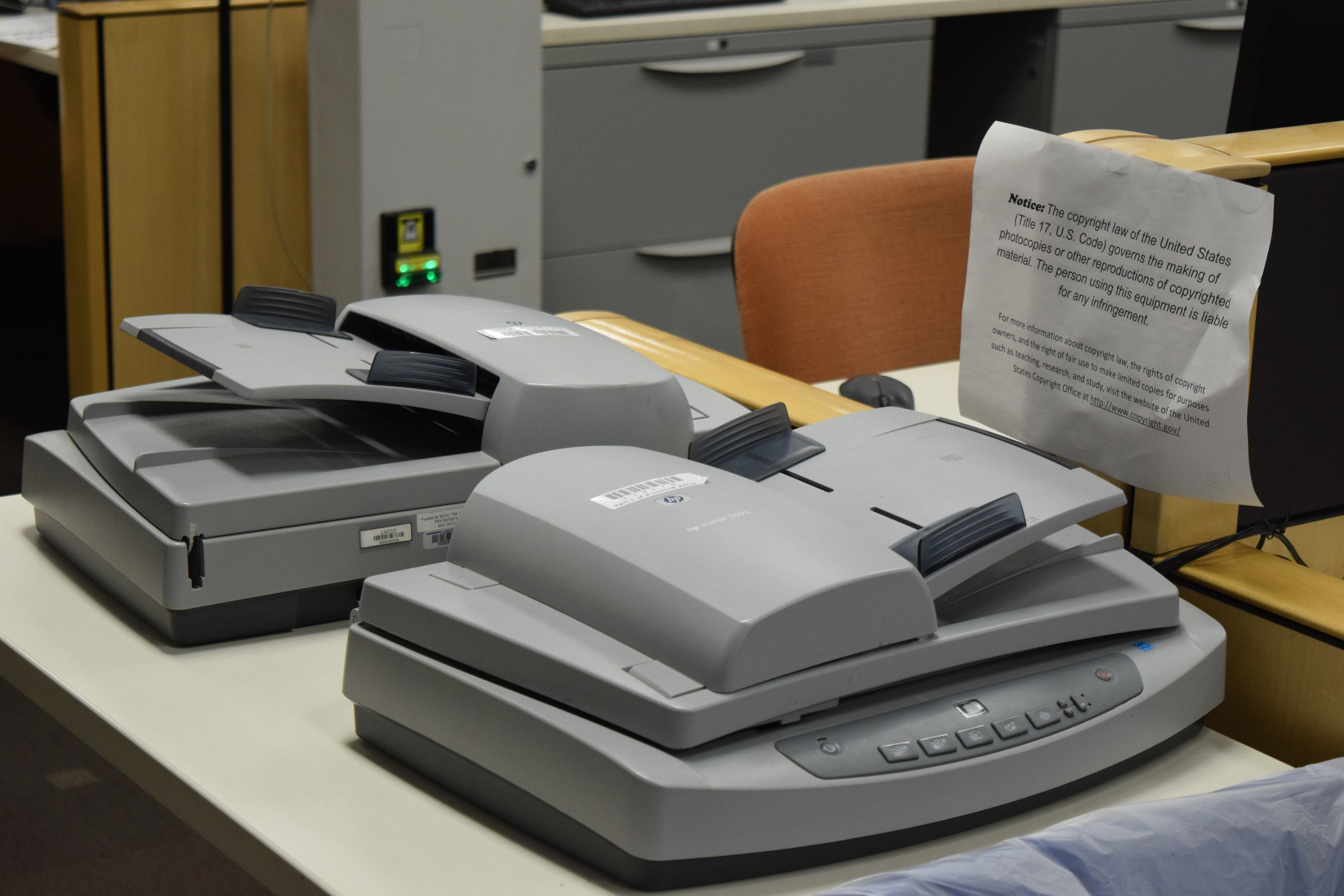
Two ScanJet 5590s set up at a college library

The ScanJet 5p was replaced by the ScanJet 5100c in March 1998, which was HP's first color ScanJet to connect to PCs using a 25-pin enhanced parallel port instead of SCSI. HP introduced a new technology to its RIP with the ScanJet 5100c, called Intelligent Scanning Technology (IST), which analyzes the scanned image for photo, line-art, and textual elements; identifies their boundaries; and applies post-processing to optimize each region for contrast and sharpness and performs a tracing algorithm to detected line art—turning them into vector graphics and rasterizing the recreated vector as part of the final scan. IST was reportedly buggy and resulted in distorted output caused by false positives. The ScanJet 5200c, released in 1999, added USB connectivity, while the ScanJet 5300c, released in 2000, bumped the optical resolution to 1200 dpi and the color depth to 42 bits. The ScanJet 5370c, released in the same year, came with an optional transparency adapter that replaced the old system (in which the top lid is entirely replaced with the adapter unit) with a smaller, standalone unit that rests on the flatbed itself (with the lid open), plugging into the back of the main ScanJet unit to power its backlight.

2001's ScanJet 5470c bumped the optical resolution to 2400 dpi and was alternatively sold as the 5490c with the ADF built-in. 2002's ScanJet 5550c was sold exclusively as an ADF-enabled flatbed for the document processing market. The ScanJet 5530, a more traditional image scanner, bumped the color depth to 48 bits and included a miniature ADF for 4-by-6-inch prints. 2004's ScanJet 5590 was an ADF–flatbed hybrid similar to the 5550c that increased the maximum number of pages per sheetfed scan from 35 pages to 50 pages.

=== ScanJet Enterprise Flow ===
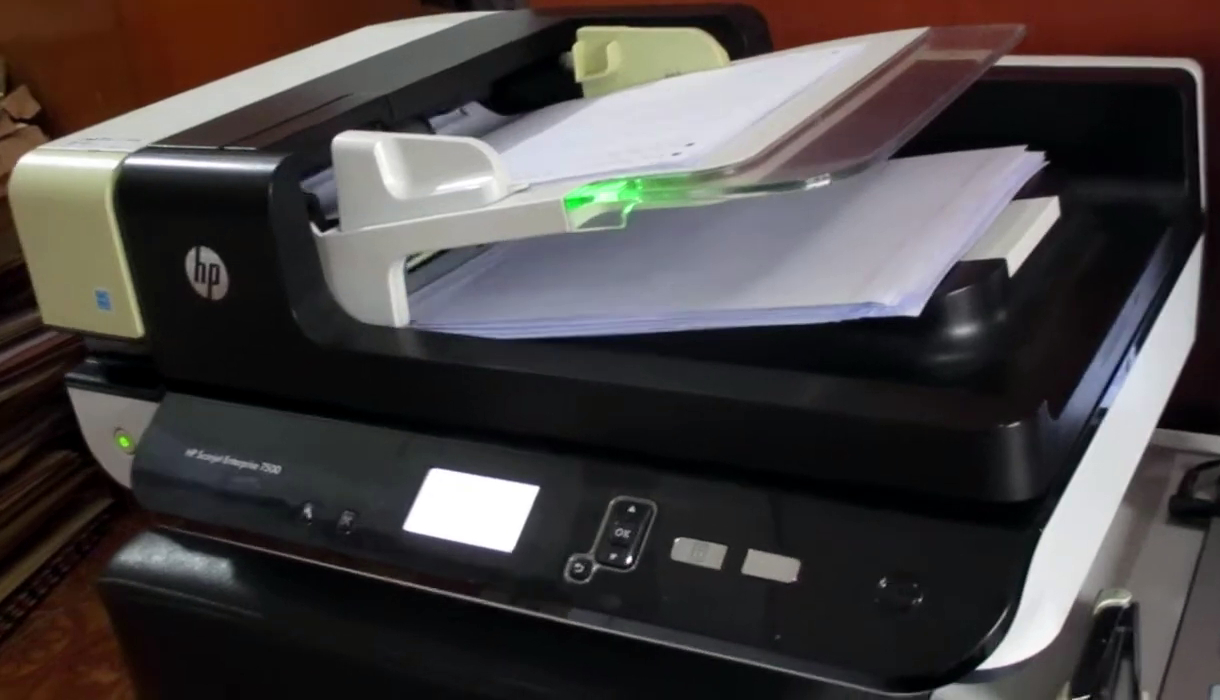
ScanJet Enterprise Flow 7500

The ScanJet Enterprise Flow is a line of networked ADF scanners. Models include:

- ScanJet Enterprise Flow 5000 s2 (2013)
- ScanJet Enterprise Flow 5000 s4 (2017)
- ScanJet Enterprise Flow 5000 s5 (2022)
- ScanJet Enterprise Flow 7500 (2013) – combination flatbed/ADF
- ScanJet Enterprise Flow 7000 s2 (2013)
- ScanJet Enterprise Flow 7000 s3 (2017)

=== ScanJet Pro ===
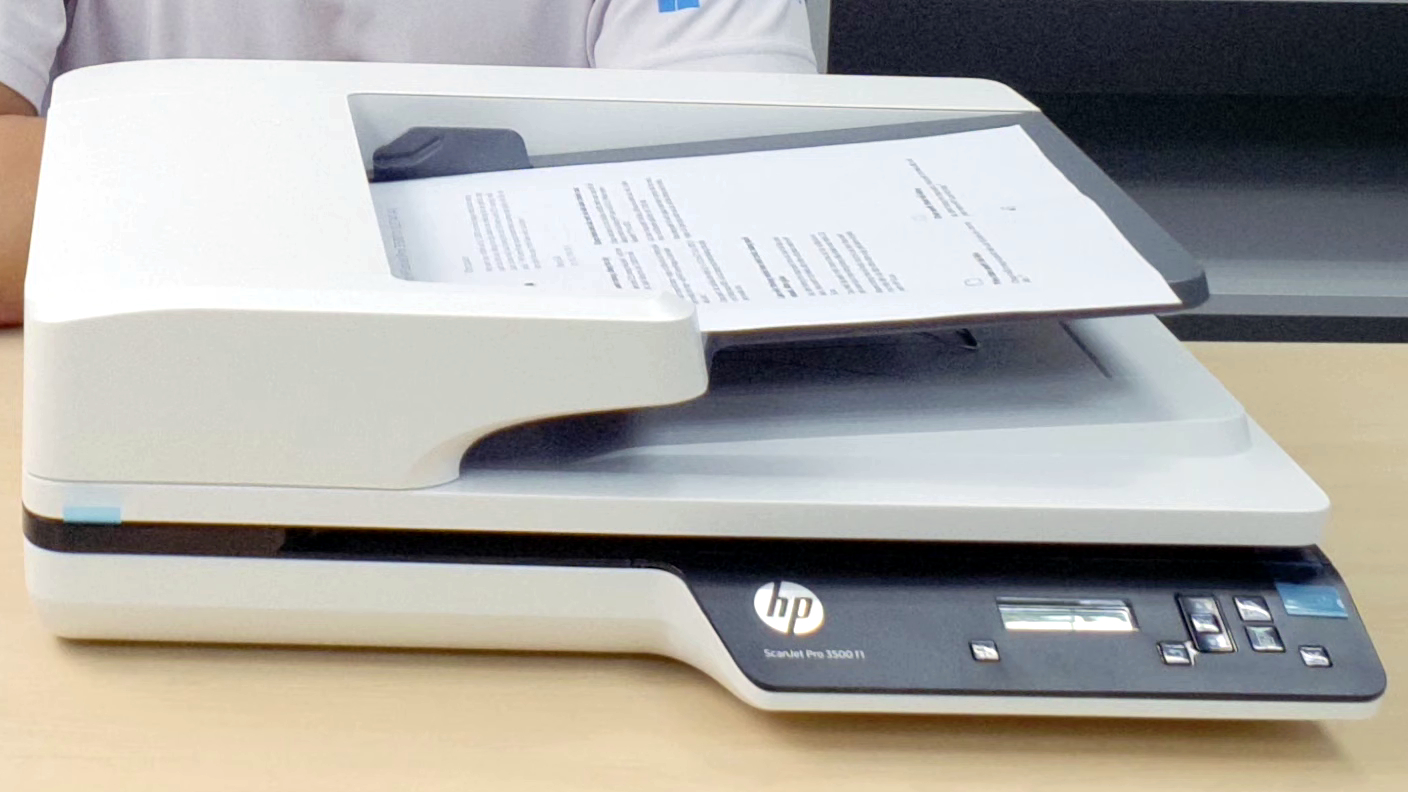
ScanJet Pro 3500 F1, flatbed model from 2015

The ScanJet Pro is a line of flatbed and ADF scanners. Models include:

- ScanJet Pro 1000 Mobile (2013)
- ScanJet Pro 2000 s1 (2017)
- ScanJet Pro 2500 f1 (2015)
- ScanJet Pro 2600 f1 (2022)
- ScanJet Pro 3000 s2 (2013)
- ScanJet Pro 3000 s3 (2017)
- ScanJet Pro 3500 f1 (2015)
- ScanJet Pro 3600 f1 (2022)
- ScanJet Pro 4500 fn1 (2017)
- ScanJet Pro N4000 snw1 (2022)

=== Other models ===
- ScanJet 200 (2013) – compact, budget flatbed, CIS
- ScanJet 2200c (2001) – budget flatbed, CCD
- ScanJet 2400 (2004) – budget flatbed, CCD
- ScanJet 3300c (1999) – budget flatbed, CCD
- ScanJet 3400c (2000) – budget flatbed, CCD
- ScanJet 3500c (2002) – budget flatbed, CCD
- ScanJet 3670 (2004) – budget flatbed, CCD
- ScanJet 3770 (2005) – budget flatbed, CCD
- ScanJet 3970 (2004) – budget flatbed, CCD
- ScanJet 4070 (2004) – budget flatbed, CCD
- ScanJet 4100c (1998) – budget flatbed, CCD
- ScanJet 4200c (1999) – budget flatbed, CCD
- ScanJet 4300c (2000) – budget flatbed, CCD
- ScanJet 4370 (2005) – budget flatbed, CCD
- ScanJet 4400c (2001) – budget flatbed, CCD
- ScanJet 4470c (2001) – budget flatbed, CCD
- ScanJet 4570c (2002) – budget flatbed, CCD
- ScanJet 7400c (2001) – budget flatbed, dual CCD
- ScanJet 7650 (2005) – business flatbed/ADF, CCD
- ScanJet 8200 (2003) – business flatbed, CCD
- ScanJet 8250 (2005) – business flatbed/duplex ADF, CCD
- ScanJet 8270 (2006) – business flatbed/duplex ADF, CCD
- ScanJet 8290 (2003) – professional flatbed, built-in transparency adapter, CCD
- ScanJet 8350 (2006) – business flatbed/ADF, CCD
- ScanJet 8390 (2006) – business flatbed/ADF, CCD
- ScanJet G2410 (2007) – budget flatbed, dual CCD
- ScanJet G3110 (2009) – budget flatbed, CCD
- ScanJet G4010 (2008) – professional flatbed, built-in transparency adapter, CCD
- ScanJet G4050 (2006) – professional ADF, built-in transparency adapter, CCD
- ScanJet N6310 (2009) – professional flatbed/ADF, built-in transparency adapter, CCD
- ScanJet N6350 (2009) – business flatbed/ADF, built-in transparency adapter, networked, CCD
- Scanjet N7710 (2007) – business duplex ADF, CCD
- ScanJet N8420 (2007) – business flatbed/duplex ADF (25 ppm), CCD
- ScanJet N8460 (2007) – business flatbed/duplex ADF (35 ppm), CCD
