= Multi-function printer =

Office machine

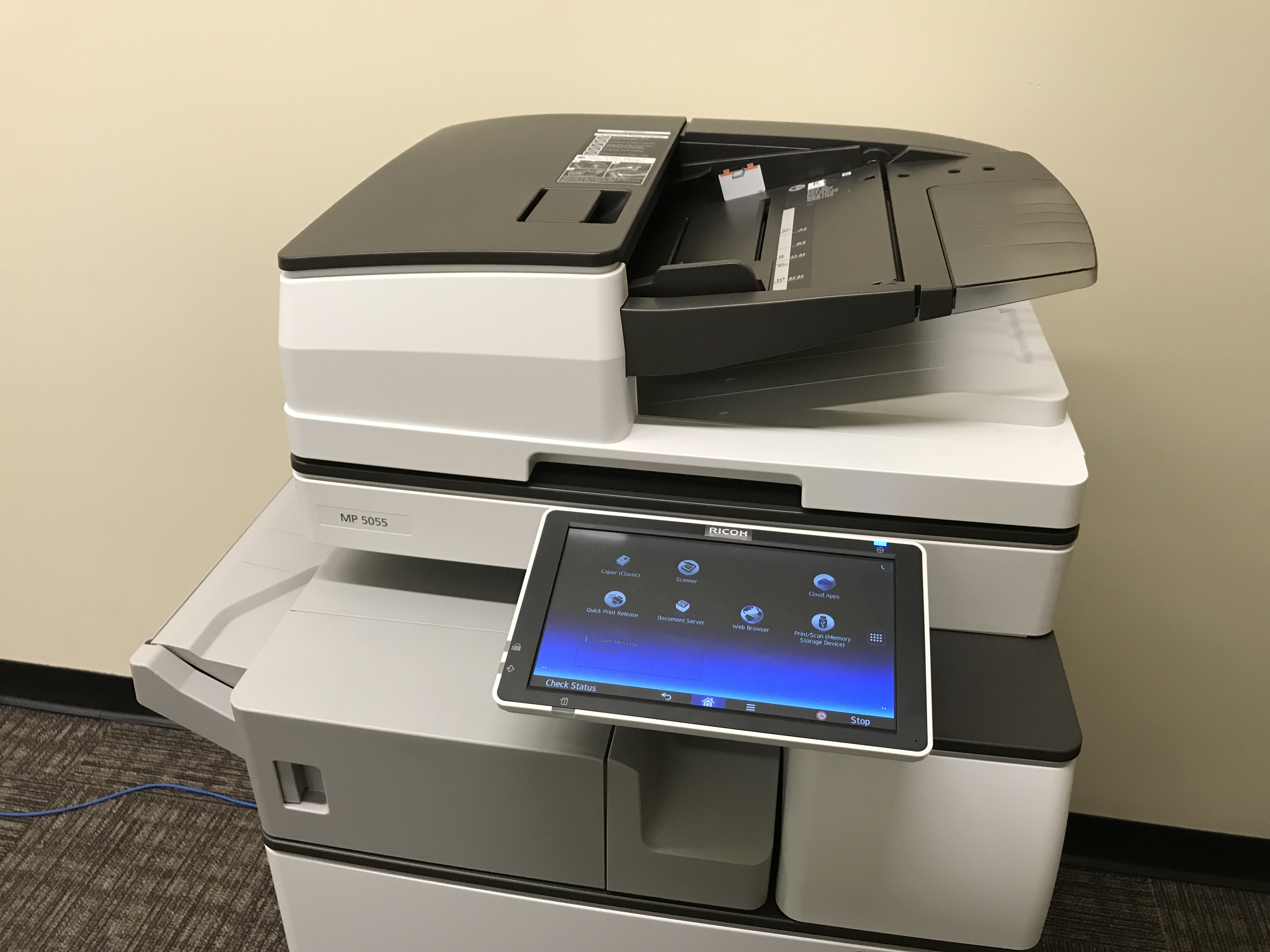
A Ricoh 5055 B&W MFP (released in 2017).

An MFP (multi-function product/printer/peripheral), multi-functional, all-in-one (AIO), or multi-function device (MFD), is an office machine which incorporates the functionality of multiple devices in one, so as to have a smaller footprint in a home or small business setting (the SOHO market segment), or to provide centralized document management/distribution/production in a large-office setting. A typical MFP may act as a combination of some or all of the following devices: email, fax, photocopier, printer, scanner.

== Types of MFPs ==
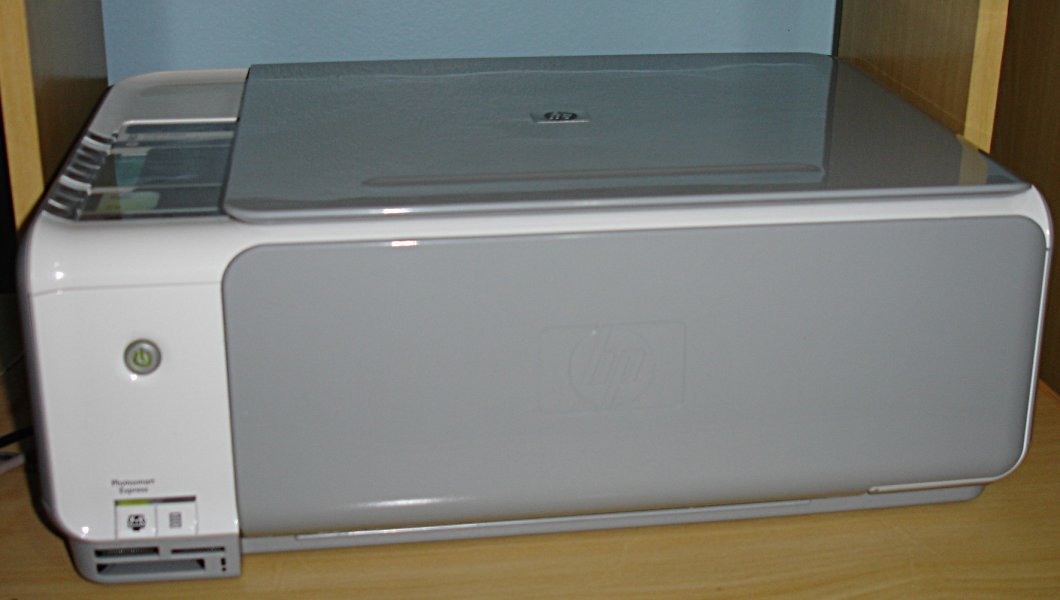
A Hewlett-Packard Photosmart C3180, featuring card readers and photo printing. An example of an AIO.

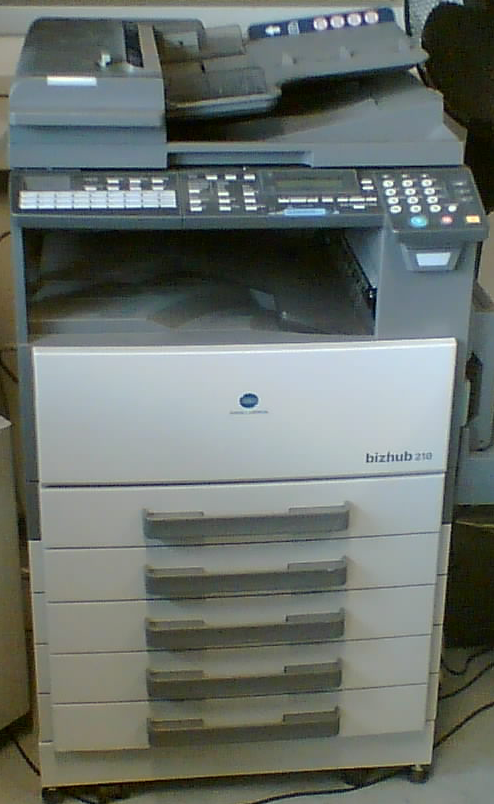
A Konica Minolta bizhub 210. An example of a freestanding SOHO MFP.

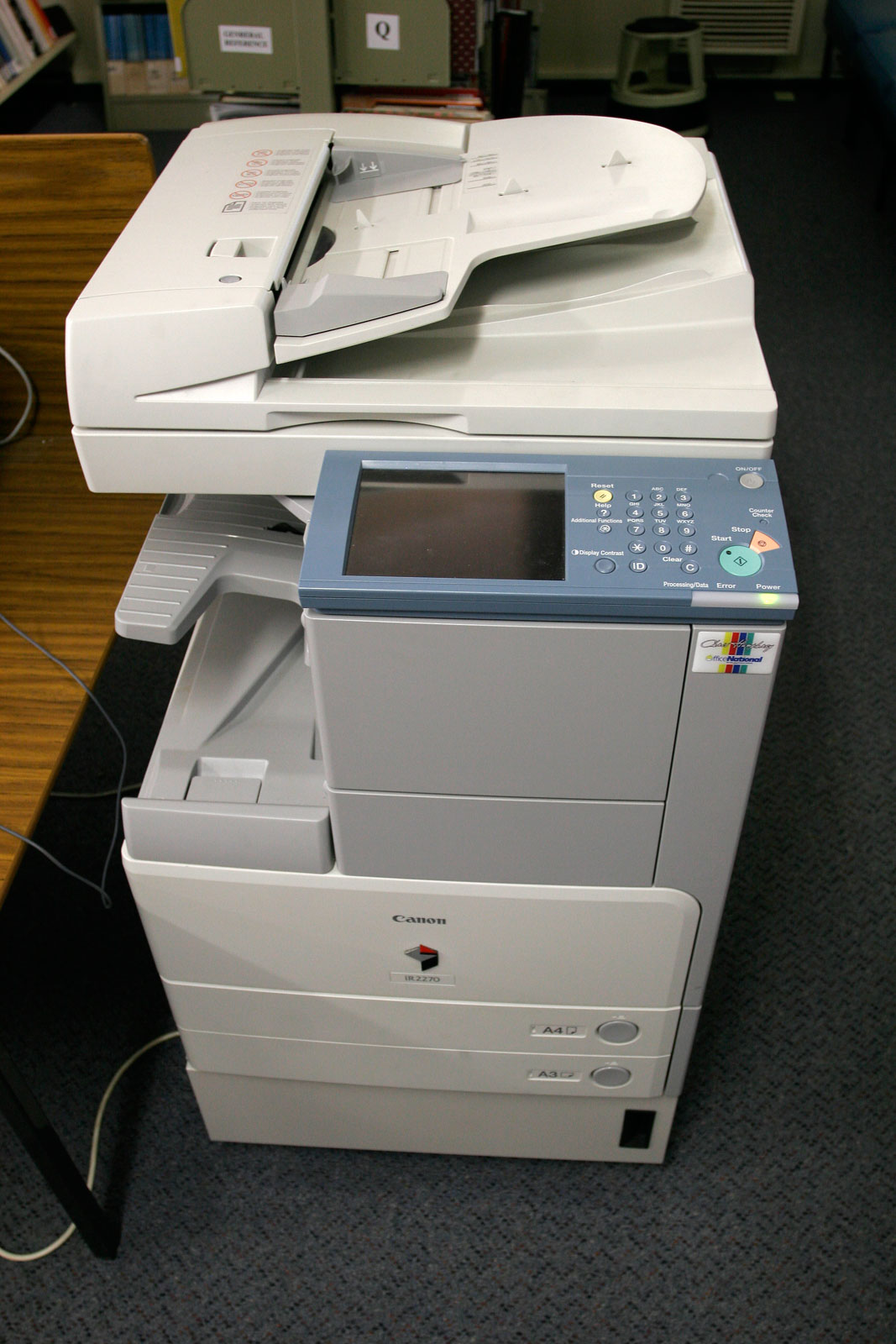
A Canon IR2270. An example of a mid-range Office MFP.

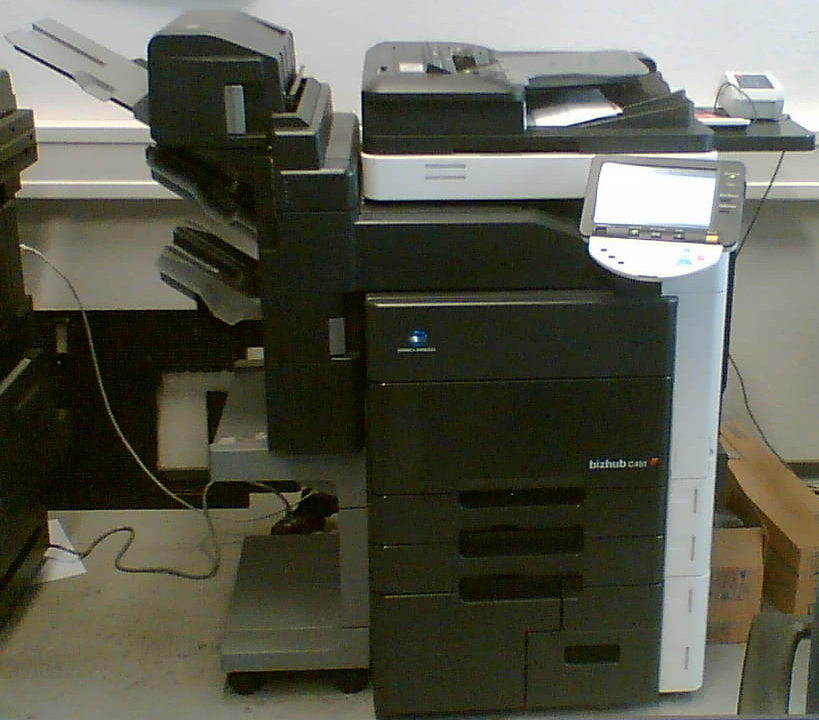
A Konica Minolta bizhub C451 with an attached finisher. An example of a mid-range Office colour MFP.

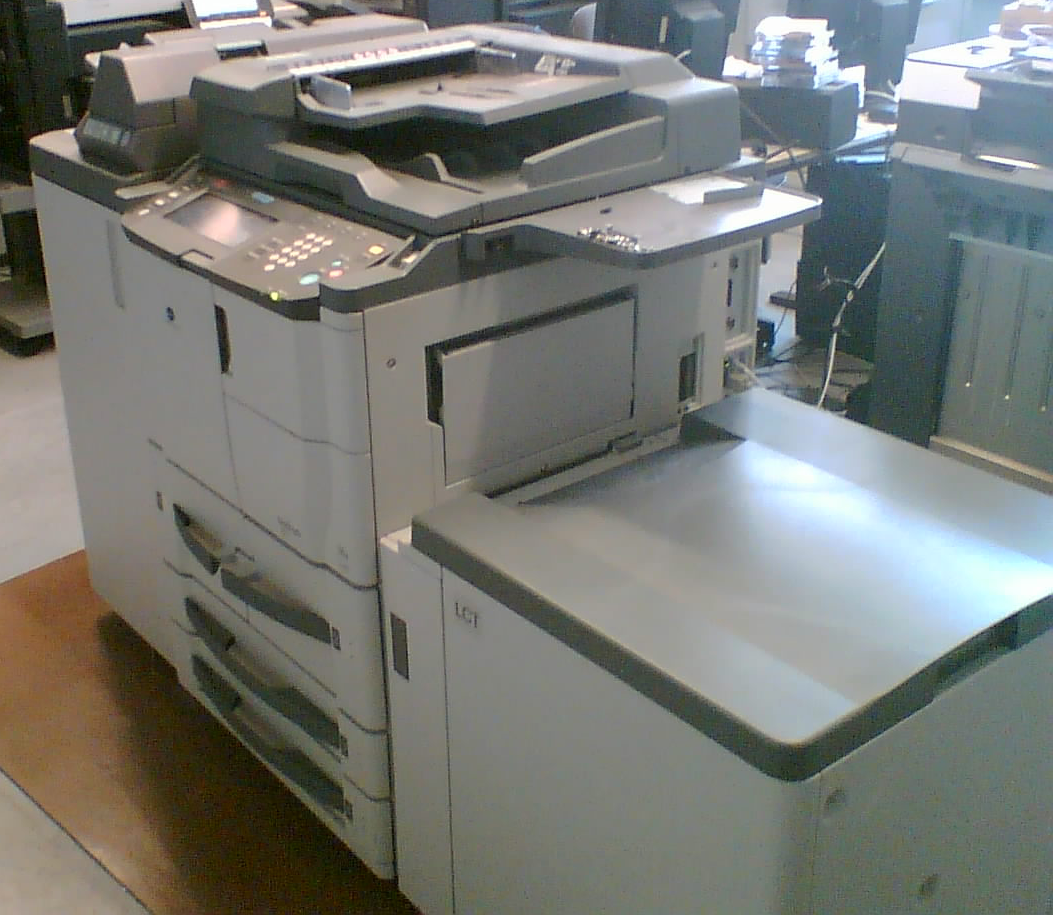
A Konica Minolta bizhub 750. An example of a high end Office Black and White MFP.

MFP manufacturers traditionally divided MFPs into various segments. The segments roughly divided the MFPs according to their speed in pages-per-minute (ppm) and duty-cycle/robustness. However, many manufacturers are beginning to avoid the segment definition for their products, as speed and basic functionality alone do not always differentiate the many features that the devices include. Two color MFPs of a similar speed may end in the same segment, despite having potentially very different feature-sets, and therefore very different prices. From a marketing perspective, the manufacturer of the more expensive MFP would want to differentiate their product as much as possible to justify the price difference, and therefore avoids the segment definition.

Many MFP types, regardless of the category they fall into, also come in a "printer only" variety, which is the same model without the scanner unit included. This can even occur with devices where the scanner unit physically appears highly integrated into the product.

As of 2013, almost all printer manufacturers offer multifunction printers. They are designed for home, small business, enterprise and commercial use. Naturally, the cost, usability, robustness, throughput, output quality, etc. all vary with the various use cases. However, they all generally do the same functions; printing, scanning, and photocopying. In the commercial/enterprise area, most MFP have used laser-printer technology, while the personal, SOHO environments, utilize inkjet methods. Typically, inkjet printers have struggled with delivering the performance and color-saturation demanded by enterprise/large business use. However, HP has recently launched a business-grade MFP using inkjet technology. From the 1980s to the 2010s, multi-function printers often included fax functionality, contemporary with the prevalence of fax machines in office communications.

In any case, instead of rigidly defined segments based on speed, more general definitions based on intended target audience and capabilities are becoming much more common as of 2013. While the sector lacks formal definitions, it is common agreed amongst MFP manufacturers that the products fall roughly into the following categories:

=== All-in-one ===
An All-in-one is a small desktop unit, designed for home or home-office use.

These devices focus on scan and print functionality for home use, and may come with bundled software for organising photos, simple OCR and other uses of interest to a home user. An All-in-one will always include the basic functions of Print and Scan, with most also including Copy functionality and a lesser number with Fax capabilities.

In the past, these devices were usually not networked, and were generally connected by USB or Parallel. As of 2013 even inexpensive all-in-one devices support ethernet and/or Wi-Fi connections. In some cases the wireless devices require connection to a host computer by wire (usually USB) to initialize the device, and once initial setup is done, support wireless operations for all the work performed thereafter.

All-in-one devices may have features oriented to home and personal use that are not found in larger devices. These functions include smart card readers, direct connection to digital cameras (e.g. PictBridge technology) and other similar uses.

The print engine of most All-in-one devices is based either on a home desktop inkjet printer, or on a home desktop laser printer. They may be black-and-white or colour capable. Laser models provide a better result for text while inkjet gives a more convincing result for images and they are a cheaper multifunctional.

Some of these devices, like the Hewlett-Packard Photosmart C8180 printer, have a DVD burner and LightScribe functionality where the user could burn DVDs and create an image on a special Lightscribe DVD, or CD using special software like Roxio or Nero AG Software Suite to create the image. To create a Lightscribe image takes about 10 to 25 minutes.

=== SOHO MFP ===
A large desktop or small freestanding unit, designed for Small Office/Home Office use. Often, the form factor of the MFP (desktop or freestanding) depends on the options added, such as extra paper trays.

Generally a SOHO MFP will have basic Print, Copy, Scan and Fax functionality only, but towards the larger end of the scale, may include simple document storage and retrieval, basic authentication functions and so on, making the higher end of the "SOHO" scale difficult to differentiate from the lower end of the "Office" MFP scale.

SOHO MFPs are usually networked, however may also be connected via USB or, less frequently, parallel. SOHO MFPs may have basic finishing functionality such as duplexing, stapling and hole-punching, however this is rare. In general, document output offset, sorting and collation are standard capabilities.

By comparison to an all-in-one product, a SOHO MFP is more likely to have an automatic document feeder, greater fax capabilities and faster output-performance. Most SOHO MFPs have their history in low-end black and white photocopiers, and the print engine is accordingly based around this type of technology.

=== Office MFP ===
A mid-sized free-standing unit, designed as a central office system.

These units are usually the most fully featured type of MFP. They include the basic Print, Copy and Scan functions with optional Fax functionality as well as networked document storage with security, authentication using common network user credentials, ability to run custom software (often a manufacturer will supply a Software development kit), advanced network scan destinations such as FTP, WebDAV, Email, SMB and NFS stores, encryption for data transmission and so on.

Office MFPs usually have moderately advanced finishing functions as options such as duplexing, stapling, holepunching, offset modes and booklet-creation.

Office MFPs are almost always networked, however some have optional or standard (but infrequently used) USB and parallel connections. Most Office MFPs have their history in mid-range photocopiers (both colour and black-and-white), and the print engine is therefore based around this type of technology, however, Hewlett-Packard recently introduced two Office MFPs based on fixed-head inkjet technology.

=== Production printing MFP ===
A large free-standing unit, designed as a central printing-device or reprographic-department device.

These devices, while far larger and more expensive than Office MFPs, generally do not have all of the advanced network functionality of their smaller relations. They instead concentrate on high-speed, high-quality output, and highly advanced finishing functionality including book creation with cover insertion (including hot-glue binding) and so on. Production printing itself is often further divided into "light" production printing and "heavy" production printing, with the differentiating factor being the speed. A 100ppm device for example, falls into the light production printing category by the standards of most manufacturers.

Because of the focus on printing, while most Production Printing MFPs have a scanner, it is infrequently used and often only has very basic functionality.

There are a variety of different print engines for Production Printing MFPs, however in the "light" end of the Production Printing market, most are based on the large Office MFPs, which themselves are based on photocopier technology as described above. Production Printing MFPs may also be known as "Print on demand" devices, or "Digital presses". This latter term can also be used to refer to the print controller controlling the MFP, however.

== Characteristics ==
It is useful to consider the features and functions of an MFP before integrating it into a home or office environment. It is possible to have an MFP with almost all of the features and functions listed below, however a typical AIO or SOHO MFP is unlikely to incorporate many of these.

An (incomplete) list of features that an MFP may offer or will vary depending on the MFP under consideration (in any segment):

=== Print features/functions ===
- Input
  - Network print types available (Raw, LPR, IPP, FTP printing, print via email etc.)
  - Network, USB, Parallel or other connection types
  - PDLs (PostScript, PCL, XPS etc.) and direct interpreters (PDF, TIFF, etc.) supported
  - Printer drivers available for different operating systems
- Output
  - Ability to print directly to the MFP's internal storage function
  - Capability of using the MFP's finishing functions (see below under Copy features/functions)
  - Direct CD/DVD Label Printing (usually only available on some InkJet AIO models)
  - Duplex printing capability - Whether the MFP can print on both sides of a sheet of paper without manual intervention by the user
  - Paper formats (what kind of paper sizes and stocks the MFP can output)
  - Printer technology (e.g. InkJet/Laser/Color Laser)
  - Printing speed (typically given in pages per minute or ppm)
  - Resolution DPI - this is an important metric for both printing and scanning quality. (Note that print DPI is rarely greater than 600dpi actual. Some MFPs use a system similar to sub-pixel rendering on computer displays to give "enhanced" resolutions of 1200x600 or 1800x600, however this is not a true resolution)

=== Scan features/functions ===
- Input
  - Ability to retrieve a document from internal storage and send it as if it was a new "scan"
  - Automatic document feeder (ADF) - this allows multiple sheets of paper to be input without manually placing each piece of paper on the platen glass.
  - Duplex scanning capability (depends on the ADF) - Whether the MFP can scan both sides of a sheet of paper without manual intervention by the user.
- Output
  - Scan file formats available (e.g. PDF, TIFF, JPEG, XPS, etc.)
  - Scan transfer methods available (e.g. FTP, WebDAV, Email, SMB, NFS, TWAIN)
  - Security of scanned documents - such as PDF encryption, digital signatures and so on.

=== Fax features/functions ===
- Answering machine
- Cordless telephone (generally only a consideration for AIO or smaller SOHO products)
- Color Fax capability
- PC Fax send and receive capability
- Sent / Received Faxes Forwarding to E-mail capability (via SMTP)
- TCP/IP Fax methods such as SIP Fax (Fax over IP), Network Fax (via SMTP), Internet Fax and so on

=== Copy features/functions ===
- Document Finishing capabilities
  - Duplex output
  - Stapling
    - Single point
    - Staple positioning
    - Two point
  - Hole punching
    - International standard ISO 838 2-hole
    - Swedish "triohålning" 4-hole
    - US 3-hole
    - "888" 4-hole
  - Folding
    - Cover binding (generally only available on production printing models) - differs from "cover insertion", in that a cover is physically bound to the book instead of simply placing it around the other pages. Cover binding often uses hot glue to bind the cover to the finished book.
    - Cover insertion for booklets
    - Fold and centre staple (for Booklet pagination)
    - Half fold / crease
    - Tri-fold / Envelope-folding
    - Trimming for folded documents to avoid "creep"
- Document editing modes
  - Booklet pagination / "perfect binding" booklet pagination
  - Image scaling / rotation
  - n-in-one (2 in 1, 4 in 1 etc.)
  - Page numbering / text & image stamping / watermarking
- Plus, see items under "Print features/functions" output and "Scan features/functions" input

=== Document storage features/functions ===
- Documents storage capability the MFP
- Storage (HDD) capacity
- User authentication for the stored document, and any relationship to the user authentication of the MFP (e.g. Network authentication with a server or custom software, internal only, etc.)

=== Network features/functions ===
- Active Directory or other authentication functionality
- Data encryption
- IPv6 support
- SNMP support - both private and public MIB specifications
- Wireless network capability

=== Other features/functions ===
- SDK availability and licensing model
- Software - Many MFPs support advanced functionality through third party software such as optical character recognition. In some cases, these software components are not specific to the MFP being used, however it is important to determine this, as in other cases proprietary technologies are used that effectively tie the software to the platform.
- User interface - By their nature, MFPs are complex devices. Many MFPs now include LCD screens and other user interface aids. Generally, AIO and SOHO products contain simple LCD displays, while Office MFPs contain advanced LCD panels resembling a custom computer-like user interface (some MFPs also offer optional keyboard and mouse attachments).

== Internal architecture ==
=== Hardware ===
MFPs, like most external peripherals that are capable of functioning without a computer, are essentially a type of computer themselves. They contain memory, one or more processors, and often some kind of local storage, such as a hard disk drive or flash memory. As mentioned in the Types of MFP section, the physical print engine may be based on several technologies, however most larger MFPs are an evolution of a digital photocopier.

==== Security ====
When disposing of old printers with local storage, one should keep in mind that confidential documents (print, scan, copy jobs) are potentially still unencrypted on the printer's local storage and can be undeleted. Crypto-shredding can be a countermeasure.

=== Software ===
MFPs also run a set of instructions from their internal storage, which is comparable to a computer's operating system.

Generally, as the size and complexity of an MFP increases, the more like a computer the device becomes. It is uncommon for a small AIO or even a SOHO MFP to use a general purpose operating system, however many larger MFPs run Linux or VxWorks.

Additionally, many print controllers, separate, but integral to the MFP, also run computer operating systems, with Linux and Microsoft Windows (often Windows NT 4.0 Embedded, Windows XP Embedded).

On top of the core operating system and firmware, the MFP will also provide several functions, equivalent to applications or in some cases daemons or services.

These functions may include (amongst many others):

- Bytecode interpreters or virtual machines for internally hosted third party applications
- Image conversion and processing functions
- MFP Panel control for user input
- Network service clients for sending of documents to different destinations
- Network service servers for receiving documents for print or storage
- Raster image processing functions (although, often this task is handled by a separate print controller unit instead)
- Web server for remote management functions

== Software ==
Computer systems equipped with the proper software must be able to take advantage of the MFP's capabilities, an important requirement to research when considering integrating an MFP with an existing office. Some or all of the following functionality might be provided:

- Device administration and configuration
- Document imaging, such as ad hoc scanning
- Document management such as remote scanning, document type conversion from text to PDF, OCR, etc.
- Document type/paper input mode selection
- Monitoring of print quotas, toner/ink levels etc.

== Software development kits ==
In addition to specific software packages, many vendors also provide the ability for the user to develop software to communicate with the MFP through a Software development kit. Different vendors have different licensing models, from completely "closed" proprietary systems (often with large costs involved) to open strategies with no direct cost involved. An incomplete list of these technologies is:

- Nuance OmniPage
- Canon MEAP (Multifunctional Embedded Application Platform)
- HP Open Extensibility Platform (OXP)
- Konica Minolta OpenAPI
- Lexmark Embedded Solutions Framework (eSF)
- Ricoh SmartSDK
- Samsung XOA - eXtensible Open Architecture
- Sharp OSA (Open Systems Architecture)
- Toshiba OPA (Open Platform Architecture)
- Xerox EIP (Extensible Interface Platform)
- Brother BSI (Brother Solutions Interface)
- Epson EOP (Epson Open Platform)
- Kyocera HyPAS (Hybrid Platform for Advanced Solutions)
- OKI sXP (smart Extendable Platform)
- Fujifilm Apeos iiX Framework

In general, these technologies fall into one of two technical models - Server based, or MFP internal software.

Server based technologies use a method to communicate information to and from the MFP (often SOAP/XML based), running the operating code on a suitably powered computer on the network. This method has the advantage of being very flexible, in that the software is free to do anything that the developer can make the computer do. The only limit from the MFP itself is the capability of the MFP to display a user interface to the workings of the application. As many of the applications are based around custom printing, scanning and authentication requirements, the MFP manufacturers that use this method gravitate towards these core technologies in the user interface.

MFP internal software, by comparison, has the advantage of not requiring anything outside of the MFP. The software runs within the MFP itself and so even a complete network outage will not disrupt the software from working (unless of course the software requires a network connection for other reasons). MFP internal software is often, but not always, Java based and runs in a Java virtual machine within the MFP. The negative side to this kind of software is usually that it is much more limited in capabilities than Server based systems.

== Manufacturers ==
MFP manufacturers/brands include

- Brother
- Canon
- Dell
- Epson
- Hewlett-Packard
- Kodak
- Konica Minolta
- Kyocera
- Lexmark
- Océ (Canon)
- Okidata
- Olivetti
- Panasonic
- Ricoh
- Samsung
- Sharp
- Sindoh
- Toshiba
- Utax
- Xerox
- Infoeglobe

Note that not all of these manufacturers produce all types of MFP - some may only focus on AIO products, whilst others may only focus on Production Printing, while yet more may cover a wider range.

== See also ==
- PictBridge allows images to be printed directly from digital cameras to a printer, without a computer.
- Computer printer
- Canon NoteJet
