= Mike Phillips (speech recognition) =

CEO and co-founder of Sense Labs

Michael Phillips (born August 1, 1961) is the CEO and co-founder of Sense Labs and a pioneer in machine learning, including mobile speech recognition and text-to-speech technology.

== Education ==
Phillips was a student in electrical engineering at Carnegie Mellon University. He was also a researcher for Carnegie Mellon and then a research scientist at the Spoken Language Systems group at the Massachusetts Institute of Technology (MIT), where he helped to develop VOYAGER, an “urban navigation and exploration system” that could recognize and interpret basic spoken queries. VOYAGER was one of the first research systems to combine speech recognition and natural language processing to have a conversation with a user.

== Career ==
In 1994, Phillips co-founded and became CTO of Boston-based SpeechWorks, which became one of the leading US-based vendors of speech recognition technology at the time, alongside Nuance Communications and IBM. The startup developed interactive voice response systems, including call-center interfaces for clients including Amtrak and FedEx. SpeechWorks’ technology worked for call-center interfaces because the customer could verbally answer questions posed by the human-sounding speech recognition program, rather than navigating through a menu. The technology also had time-saving “barge-in” capabilities, meaning that a customer could interrupt the system before it finished offering the full list of options. The system could also “learn.” It kept a record of names or phrases customers had used in the past so that it could learn to understand names and phrases that slightly differed from its original vocabulary.

SpeechWorks’ value more than tripled after its initial public offering, and it was acquired by ScanSoft in 2003. While Phillips was CTO at ScanSoft, he worked on technologies across the company's products, including the leading dictation software Dragon NaturallySpeaking. ScanSoft then acquired Nuance Communications in 2005, and adopted the latter's name.

Phillips returned to MIT as a visiting scientist and co-founded Vlingo in 2006, with former SpeechWorks colleague John Nguyen. An intelligent software assistant, Vlingo is a speech-to-text application integrated with user-facing apps for iPhone, Android, BlackBerry, and other smartphones. Vlingo software allowed users to text and navigate smartphones via voice recognition. The first cell phone speech recognition software that successfully interpreted user input and learned over time, the software would later be adapted into the popular personal assistant software Siri.

In 2008, Nuance Communications attempted to sue Vlingo on the grounds of patent infringement. Phillips was offered the choice to either sell Vlingo to Nuance or be sued. After six lengthy lawsuits, Phillips won, but the $3 million in legal fees drained his company's research and development funds. Vlingo was sold to Nuance in December 2011.

In 2013, Phillips co-founded a startup, Sense Labs. Headquartered in Cambridge, Massachusetts, the Sense home energy monitor is an in-development device. Once attached to a home's electric panel, it “listens” to a home's electricity usage and identifies the wattage various appliances draw. The first wave of Sense energy monitors began shipping in early December 2015.

Phillips has served on various boards and holds more than 20 patents.

== Awards ==
- 2004: Top Leader in Speech from Speech Technology Magazine
- 2005: Winner of the Speech Technology Magazine Lifetime Achievement Award

== Selected works ==
- Zue, Victor; Glass, James; Phillips, Michael; Seneff, Stephanie (1989). "The MIT SUMMIT Speech Recognition system: A progress report". Proceedings of the workshop on Speech and Natural Language - HLT '89. pp. 179–189. doi:10.3115/100964.100983. S2CID 3538583.
- MacLennan, D.; Phillips, M. (1992). "Malignant hyperthermia". Science. 256 (5058): 789–794. Bibcode:1992Sci...256..789M. doi:10.1126/science.1589759. PMID 1589759. S2CID 9693521.
- Phillips, Michael S.; Liu, Qingyun; Hammond, Holly A.; Dugan, Valarie; Hey, Patricia J.; Caskey, C. Thomas; Hess, J. Fred (1996). "Leptin receptor missense mutation in the fatty Zucker rat". Nature Genetics. 13 (1): 18–19. doi:10.1038/ng0596-18. PMID 8673096. S2CID 11315067.
- Phillips, M.S.; Lawrence, R.; Sachidanandam, R.; Morris, A.P.; Balding, D.J.; Donaldson, M.A.; Studebaker, J.F.; Ankener, W.M.; Alfisi, S.V.; Kuo, F.-S.; Camisa, A.L.; Pazorov, V.; Scott, K.E.; Carey, B.J.; Faith, J.; Katari, G.; Bhatti, H.A.; Cyr, J.M.; Derohannessian, V.; Elosua, C.; Forman, A.M.; Grecco, N.M.; Hock, C.R.; Kuebler, J.M.; Lathrop, J.A.; Mockler, M.A.; Nachtman, E.P.; Restine, S.L.; Varde, S.A.; et al. (2003). "Chromosome-wide distribution of haplotype blocks and the role of recombination hot spots". Nature Genetics. 33 (3): 382–387. doi:10.1038/ng1100. PMID 12590262. S2CID 9844702.
- Marchini, Jonathan; Cardon, Lon R.; Phillips, Michael S.; Donnelly, Peter (2004). "The effects of human population structure on large genetic association studies". Nature Genetics. 36 (5): 512–517. doi:10.1038/ng1337. PMID 15052271.
- Hamdan, Fadi F.; Daoud, Hussein; Rochefort, Daniel; Piton, Amélie; Gauthier, Julie; Langlois, Mathieu; Foomani, Gila; Dobrzeniecka, Sylvia; Krebs, Marie-Odile; Joober, Ridha; Lafrenière, Ronald G.; Lacaille, Jean-Claude; Mottron, Laurent; Drapeau, Pierre; Beauchamp, Miriam H.; Phillips, Michael S.; Fombonne, Eric; Rouleau, Guy A.; Michaud, Jacques L. (2010). "De Novo Mutations in FOXP1 in Cases with Intellectual Disability, Autism, and Language Impairment". The American Journal of Human Genetics. 87 (5): 671–678. doi:10.1016/j.ajhg.2010.09.017. PMC 2978954. PMID 20950788.
- Ross, Colin J D.; Katzov-Eckert, Hagit; Dubé, Marie-Pierre; Brooks, Beth; Rassekh, S Rod; Barhdadi, Amina; Feroz-Zada, Yassamin; Visscher, Henk; Brown, Andrew M K.; Rieder, Michael J.; Rogers, Paul C.; Phillips, Michael S.; Carleton, Bruce C.; Hayden, Michael R. (2013). "Erratum: Genetic variants in TPMT and COMT are associated with hearing loss in children receiving cisplatin chemotherapy". Nature Genetics. 45 (5): 578. doi:10.1038/ng.0513-578.
