= CPCe =

CPCe (Coral Point Count with Excel extensions) is Windows-based software that provides a tool for the determination of coral cover using transect photographs. A specified number of spatially random points are distributed on a quadrat image, and coral species lying under these points are identified. Microsoft Excel spreadsheets can be created automatically to further analyze the data. Users can create their own customized code files pertinent to their region of interest.

Additionally, CPCe can be used for image calibration and area analysis of benthic features. Excel sheets are automatically generated to summarize the area calculations for each image.

There are an estimated 3,500 users of CPCe worldwide. CPCe is provided by the National Coral Reef Institute as freeware to researchers from scientific institutions.
