= The Visioneers =

Visioneers or The Visioneers may refer to:

- The Visioneers, jazz/hip-hop project by British DJ Marc Mac
- The Visioneers. How a Group of Elite Scientists Pursued Space Colonies, Nanotechnologies, and a Limitless Future, 2012 book by UCSB professor W. Patrick McCray
- The Visioneers with Zay Harding, program featured on CBS WKND
- Visioneers, 2008 film starring Zach Galifianakis

== See also ==
- Visionaries: Knights of the Magical Light, science fantasy media franchise by Hasbro
- Visioneer, software company in California
