= ARDF =

ARDF is a four-letter acronym that can have several meanings:

- Airborne radio direction finding, a military technology used for battlefield reconnaissance
- Alaska Resource Data Files, published by the United States Geological Survey
- Amateur radio direction finding
- Automatic radio direction finder
- Automatic reversing document feeder, a type of automatic document feeder
