= Duplex scanning =

Duplex scanning is a feature of some computer scanners, and multifunction printers (MFPs) that support duplex printing. A duplex scanner can automatically scan a sheet of paper on both sides. Scanners without this capability can only scan both sides of a sheet of paper by reinserting it manually the other way up.

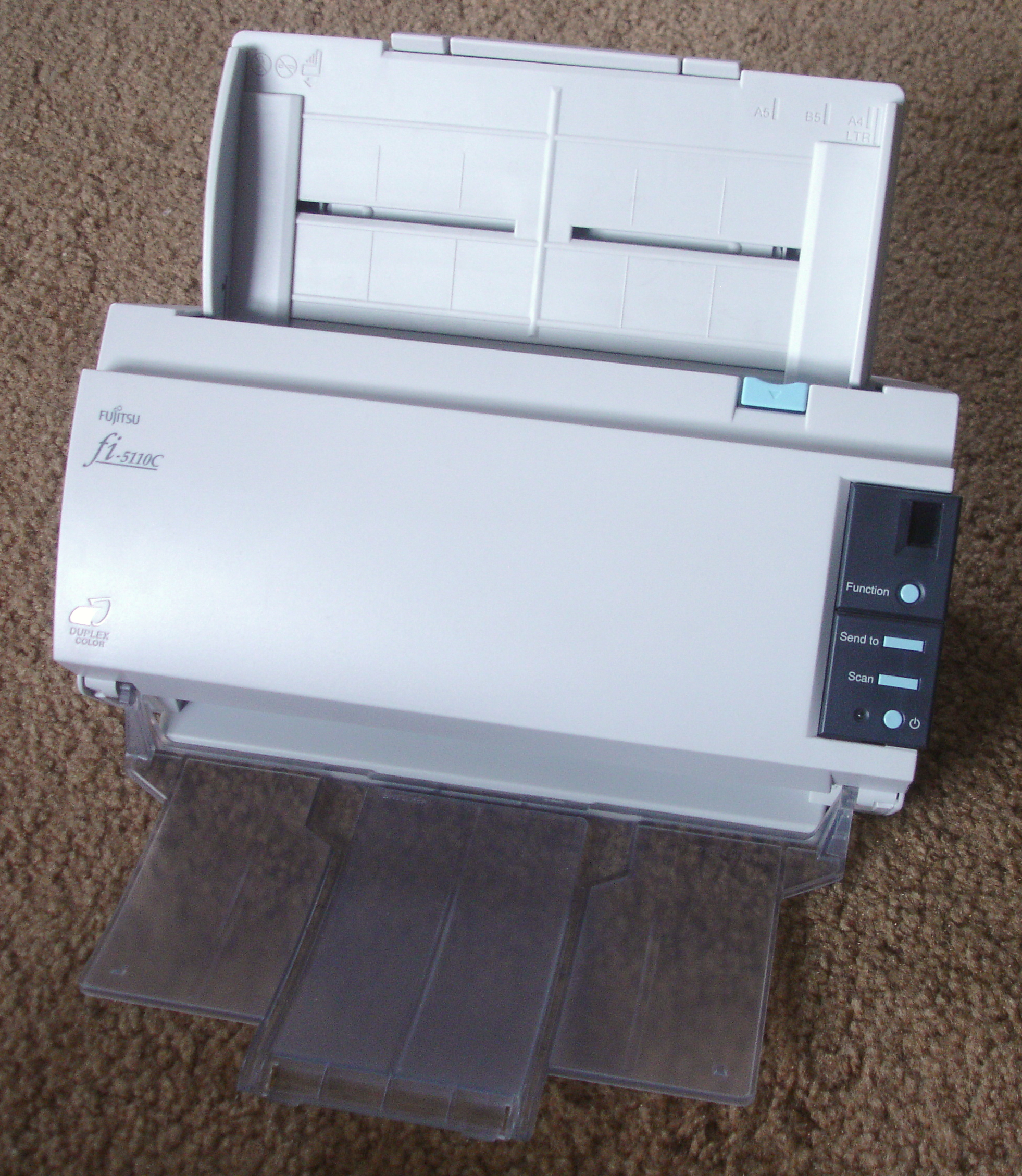
Duplex scanning document scanner (Fujitsu fi-5110C)

Duplex scanning is usually implemented on multifunction printers using a Reversing Automatic Document Feeder (RADF), which removes, reverses, and re-feeds the document after scanning one side. Duplex scanning is achieved on scanners by either RADF or by single pass duplex scanning using two cameras, one for each side of document; two-camera scanners scan twice as fast as a similar two-pass scanner.

== Typical duplex scanners ==
The following table compares features for a number of duplex scanners, mostly discontinued as of 2015:

product	dimensions (mm)	dpi	pages per minute (color)	max page size	interface
Fujitsu fi-6130 A4 Series Scanner	301 x 160 x 158	600	30@200dpi (60 duplex)	A4	USB 2.0
Plustek MobileOffice D28 Corporate	303 x 94 x 60	600	28	A4	USB 2.0
ScanShell 3000DN	300 x 50 x 45	600	3	A4	USB 2.0
Canon imageFORMULA P-150	280 x 95 x 40	600	10	216mm x 356mm	USB 2.0
Canon DR-2080C	298 x 209 x 99	600	36	216mm x 355mm	USB 2.0
HP ScanJet 7650	482 x 340 x 162	2400	12 (6 duplex)	216mm x 305mm	USB 2.0
Fujitsu fi-5110C	293 x 166 x 130	600	30	A4	USB 2.0
