= Duplex printing =

Automatic double-sided printing

Duplex printing is a feature of some computer printers and multi-function printers (MFPs) that allows the printing of a sheet of paper on both sides automatically. Print devices without this capability can only print on a single side of paper, sometimes called single-sided printing or simplex printing.

Consumer and low-to-medium volume office printers use a duplexing unit that reverses a piece of paper after the first side has been printed. Duplex multifunction printers that also support duplex scanning have a reversing automatic document feeder (RADF) for scanning both sides. Higher volume printers may effectively have two print engines in a single device, and are able to print both sides of the paper in a single pass.

== Overview ==
Duplex print devices, depending on options, software, and printer settings, can print single-sided page to single-sided page (1:1) or double-sided page to double-sided page (2:2). Many can also combine single-sided pages into a double-sided page format (1:2). Double-sided booklet formats (2:2 with a center fold) are also available, depending on optional outputs from the printer.

=== Single-Sided Printing ===
Single-sided printers can print on both sides of the paper via manual removal and turning over of a stack of sheets after one side is printed on; however, the user has to manually turn the (half-done) print job over and re-invoke the printing of the document, with care to ensure that the order and orientation is correct. Printing software frequently has an option to print only odd or even pages, simplifying this process.

=== "Perfecting" in Commercial Printing ===
In commercial printing (books, magazines, newspapers, etc.), the term applied to imparting an image to both sides of the substrate at the same time is "perfecting" and is commonly achieved—especially in lithography—by passing the substrate through a perfecting drum, thus turning the sheet over after the first side is printed. The turned sheet then continues its way through the press, being gripped at the opposite edge whilst the second side is printed. This in effect tumbles the job; therefore, accurate sheet sizing is necessary to ensure accurate backing up of the job.

Some printers only support duplexing if an optional attachment is fitted.
