= SpeechWorks =

- Founded: 1994; 32 years ago
- Founders: Mike Phillips; Bill O'Farrell
- Fate: Acquired in 2005; 21 years ago
- Headquarters: Boston, Massachusetts, United States

SpeechWorks was a company founded in Boston in 1994 by speech recognition pioneer Mike Phillips and Bill O'Farrell. The Boston-based company developed and supported speech-related computer software. Originally known as Applied Language Technologies, SpeechWorks went public in 2000 and tripled its value. It was acquired by Scansoft in 2003. ScanSoft acquired Nuance in 2005, and changed its name to Nuance Communications.

The company's main focus was bringing speech recognition solutions to phone systems. Carriers and voice portals were able to use these speech-activated services to direct consumer calls, conduct transactions, and obtain information. SpeechWorks technology was uniquely suited for these applications because it was the first software that offered a human-sounding voice that asked callers questions which they could verbally answer, allowed callers to interrupt the software before it concluded reciting a list of options, and could learn from previous calls in order to add new vocabulary to its database.

These services were largely successful: SpeechWorks client Thrifty car rentals used this service to give pricing information to callers, and 90% of surveyed customers who interacted with it expressed that the service either met or exceeded their ease of use expectations.

SpeechWorks' clients were typically in the financial services, telecommunications, and travel industries, and included FedEx, United Airlines, Amtrak, Thrifty car rentals, and others. SpeechWorks also developed “multi-modal” and text-to-speech technology as early as 2001 that enabled people to use spoken commands to navigate cell phones.

== Speechify Solo ==
Speechify Solo was a text-to-speech software released by Speechworks in 2002. Speechify Solo featured a natural, human-sounding speaking voice that could read text-based information aloud, and personalize messages for individual users. It could be applied in the fields of hand-held computing, home entertainment, and the automotive industries.

In early 2003, the National Weather Service implemented major voice improvements using Speechify, to be heard on NOAA Weather Radio. In 2016, these were replaced by a new voice associated with a new system.

== Relationship with AOL ==
In 2000, America Online, Inc, also known as AOL, released "AOL by Phone," a service that enabled AOL users to check their e-mail and access other AOL features through spoken commands from any telephone. This service was developed in partnership with Quack.com, a voice portal company owned by AOL. Quack.com utilized SpeechWorks' Speechify software to power the service's voice recognition capabilities. Two years later, in 2002, AOL purchased $5 million of SpeechWorks stock, equivalent to 1% of the company.

== Acquisitions ==
SpeechWorks purchased Ithaca based Eloquent Technologies, Inc. in 2000 for $17 million.

== See also ==
- List of speech recognition software
