= DocuWare =

German-American document software company

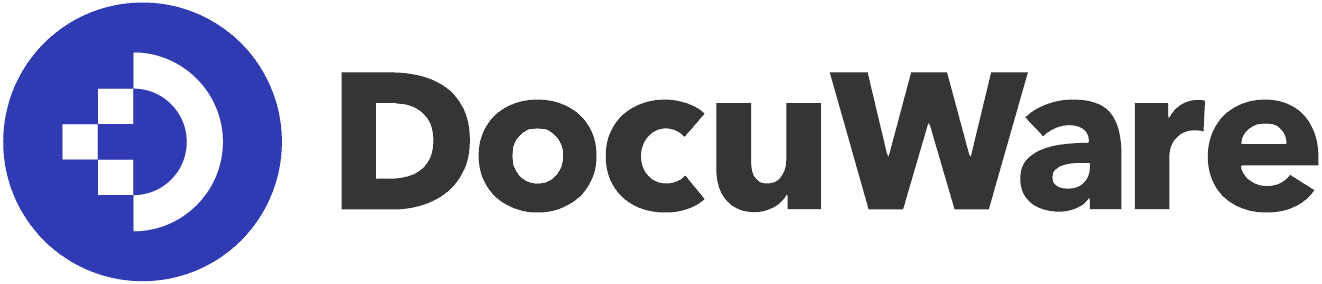

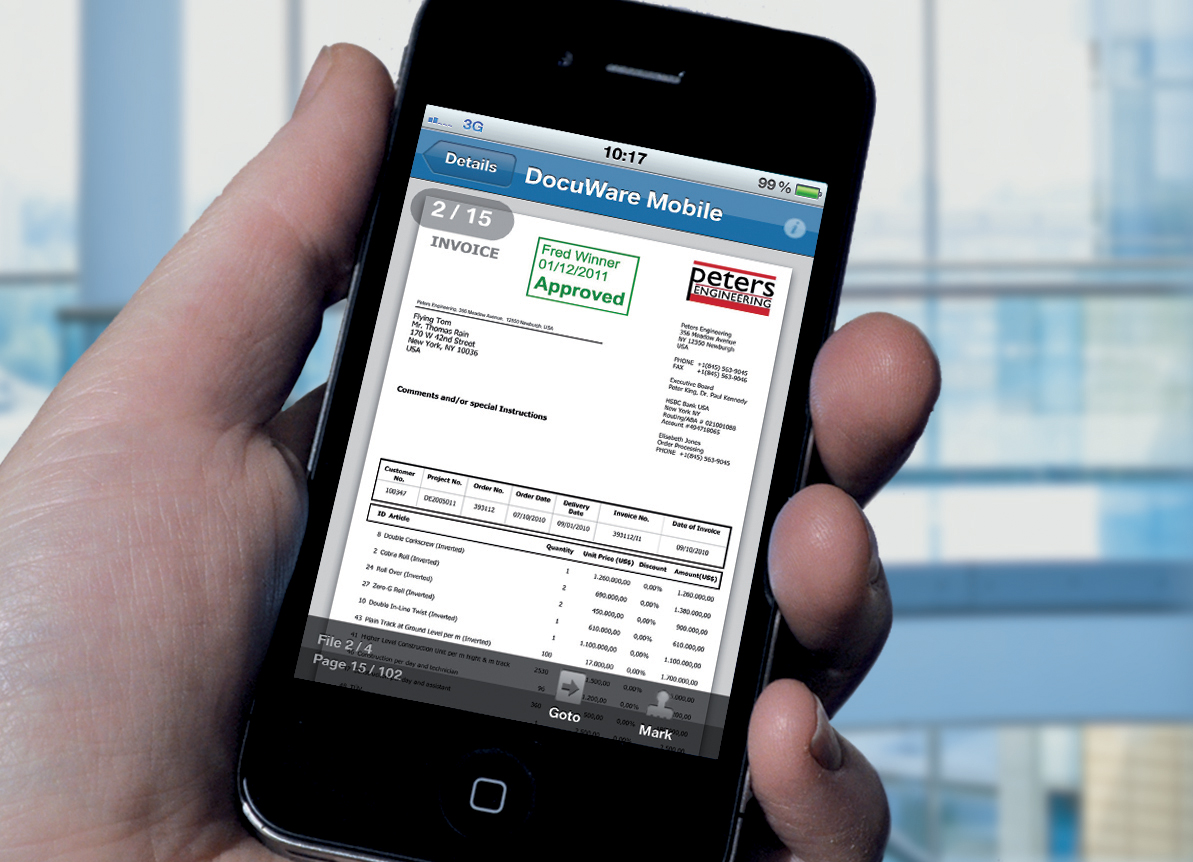
- Industry: Information Technology
- Founded: October 27, 1988, as DOCUNET GmbH
- Headquarters: Germering near Munich, Bavaria, Germany / Beacon, New York, U.S.
- Key people: Dr. Michael Berger, CEO
- Revenue: 46,647 Mio. € (2018)
- Number of employees: 600+ (2023)
- Website: www.docuware.com

DocuWare is cloud-based Software as a Service (SaaS) provider. DocuWare software provides document management, repository, and workflow automation functions (also referred to as enterprise content management (ECM) or content services).

The company is headquartered in Germany and the United States.

DocuWare is also the name of the flagship product offered by the company.

== Company history ==
On October 27, 1988, DOCUNET GmbH was founded in Germering, Germany (near Munich) by President Jürgen Biffar. Since 1990, Biffar has been managing the company with his colleague, Thomas Schneck. DOCUNET AG has since been renamed and is now known as DocuWare.

Since 1999, DocuWare has outsourced parts of its development to Sofia, Bulgaria. As of 2016, Nemetschek OOD had 42 employees working on the DocuWare product. DocuWare GmbH holds a 20 percent stake in Nemetschek OOD.

In April 2012, an investment agreement was signed between the company and Morgan Stanley Expansion Capital LP, a Morgan Stanley Investment Management private equity fund. Its aim was promoting and accelerating the global growth of DocuWare. The legal form, AG (Public Holding Company) changed to GmbH (limited liability corporation).

The company acquired U.S.-based Westbrook Technologies Inc., developer of Fortis ECM software in August 2013. In 2014, Westbrook Technologies Inc. was merged into DocuWare Corporation.

At the beginning of 2016, DocuWare appointed Dr. Michael Berger as its Chief Technology Officer (CTO). Dr. Berger joined the company in 2008 as Vice President Research & Development.

On January 1, 2019, Jürgen Biffar and Thomas Schneck stepped back from their operational roles after 30 years, and Dr. Michael Berger and Max Ertl started their new roles as co-presidents.

On August 6, 2019, DocuWare was acquired by Ricoh. DocuWare continues to operate as a standalone subsidiary of Ricoh.

In 2020, the company received approval to move its U.S. headquarters from New Windsor to Beacon, New York.

=== Subsidiaries ===
- DocuWare Corporation (Beacon, NY), founded January 1, 2001
- DocuWare Ltd (Nottinghamshire), founded April 1, 2005
- DocuWare SARL (Paris), founded September 1, 2008
- DocuWare S.L. (Barcelona), founded July 1, 2009

== See also ==
- Document Management
- Enterprise Content Management
- Records Management
