= PaperPort =

Type of software

Tungsten PaperPort
- Developer: Visioneer
- Initial release: May 30, 1995
- Stable release: PaperPort 14.7 (Windows); PaperPort Notes Version 2.1.0 (iPad) / December 11, 2020; 4 years ago (Windows); November 13, 2013; 12 years ago (iPad)
- Operating system: Windows XP, Vista, 7, 8, 10, 11
- Platform: x86, x64
- Size: 4.7 MB (iPad)
- Type: PDF software
- License: Proprietary software
- Website: www.tungstenautomation.com/products/paperport

PaperPort is commercial document management software published by Tungsten Automation, used for working with scanned documents. It uses a built-in optical character recognition to create files in searchable Portable Document Format (PDF); text in these files is indexed and can be searched for with appropriate software, such as Microsoft's Windows Search. Earlier versions of PaperPort used OmniPage to provide this function. It provides image editing tools for these files.

PaperPort allows scanned documents to be separated into individual pages, and reassembled into new PDF files.

Originally, PaperPort created files in .MAX file format natively, but later versions use PDF. Versions of PaperPort from V14 cannot edit .MAX files, but they can be converted to PDF, which can be edited.

PaperPort only supports Windows. It previously supported iOS and was compatible with the iPad. An open-source program called Paperman provides basic functionality for Linux (and has been partially ported to macOS).

== History ==
Visioneer, the original developer of PaperPort, first released its predecessor, MaxMate document communications software bundled with the MaxMate scanner and MaxMate Viewer software, in 1994 for DOS, Windows and Macintosh. The software used a visual metaphor for dragging pages and a typewriter function for annotating electronic documents. Its form-filling tool recognized lines in scanned forms to allow filling in fields and printing completed forms, replacing the laborious old method of typing entries into paper forms. It integrated with optical character recognition (OCR) software for converting scanned paper documents into editable electronic documents.

In December 2019, the Nuance document division, which included PaperPort, was sold to Kofax. On January 16, 2024, Kofax was renamed to Tungsten Automation.

== Selected versions and their estimated release dates ==
Version	Release date
7	1999
9	2003
10	2004
11	2007
14	2013
