= Nuance Communications =

American speech recognition and artificial intelligence technology company

Nuance Communications, Inc.
- Formerly: ScanSoft, Inc.
- Type: Subsidiary
- Industry: Software
- Founded: 1992; 34 years ago as Visioneer
- Headquarters: Burlington, Massachusetts, U.S.
- Key people: Mark Benjamin (chairman and CEO)
- Products: IVR, natural language understanding, OCR, speech synthesis, speech recognition, PDF, consulting, government contracts
- Number of employees: 6,500+ (2021)
- Parent: Microsoft (2021-present)
- Website: www.nuance.com

Nuance Communications, Inc. was an American multinational computer software technology corporation, headquartered in Burlington, Massachusetts, that markets speech recognition and artificial intelligence software.

Nuance merged with its competitor in the commercial large-scale speech application business, ScanSoft, in October 2005. ScanSoft was a Xerox spin-off that was bought in 1999 by Visioneer, a hardware and software scanner company, which adopted ScanSoft as the new merged company name. The original ScanSoft had its roots in Kurzweil computer products.

In April 2021, Microsoft announced it would buy Nuance Communications. The deal is an all-cash transaction of $19.7 billion, including company debt, or $56 per share. The acquisition was completed in March 2022.

== History ==
The Speech Technology and Research (STAR) Laboratory at SRI International began the journey that, in 1994, resulted in a spin-off company; Corona Corporation (later renamed to Nuance Communications). Nuance Communications (NUAN) went public on the Nasdaq Stock Market in 1995. Nuance focused on commercializing advanced speech recognition technologies. Nuance was an early spinoff of SRI's Speech Technology and Research (STAR) Laboratory, a world leader in audio processing, speech and speaker analytics and spoken language research. The technology that served as the foundation of Nuance's speech recognition solution started at the STAR Lab and helped launch Nuance more than 20 years ago.

In 1995, The SRI Language Modeling Toolkit (SRILM) was developed. This provides the tools to build and apply statistical language models (LMs), primarily for use in speech recognition, statistical tagging and segmentation, and machine translation.

In terms of commercialization of natural automated speech recognition, SRI's natural language speech recognition software was the first to be deployed by a major corporation. In 1996, Charles Schwab & Co., Inc., used Nuance's speech recognition technology to allow customers to receive stock quotes over the telephone. One of the key features of the ‘Schwab Discount Brokerage system’, was the ability to recognize English words even when spoken by customers with accents.

In 1997, Nuance Communications developed the first large scale commercial dialog system for United Parcel Services (UPS). UPS used the voice recognition platform to handle very large numbers of inquiries about package status.

The company that would later merge with Nuance Communications started life as Visioneer, incorporated in 1992. In 1999, Visioneer acquired ScanSoft, Inc. (SSFT), and the combined company became known as ScanSoft. In September 2005, ScanSoft Inc. acquired and merged with Nuance Communications (NUAN), a natural language DOD-project spinoff from SRI International. The resulting company adopted the Nuance name. During the prior decade, the two companies competed in the commercial large-scale speech application business.

On 30 September 2011, Nuance announced that it had acquired Loquendo.

=== Data breach ===
Between 2014 and 2017, Nuance exposed over 45,000 patient records.

== Solutions ==
=== ScanSoft origins ===
In 1974, Raymond Kurzweil founded Kurzweil Computer Products, Inc. to develop the first omni-font optical character-recognition system – a computer program capable of recognizing text written in any normal font. In 1980, Kurzweil sold his company to Xerox. The company became known as Xerox Imaging Systems (XIS), and later ScanSoft.

In March 1992, a new company called Visioneer, Inc. was founded to develop scanner hardware and software products, such as a sheetfed scanner called PaperMax and the document management software PaperPort. Visioneer eventually sold its hardware division to Primax Electronics, Ltd. in January 1999. Two months later, in March, Visioneer acquired ScanSoft from Xerox to form a new public company with ScanSoft as the new company-wide name.

Prior to 2001, ScanSoft focused primarily on desktop imaging software such as TextBridge, PaperPort and OmniPage. Beginning with the December 2001 acquisition of Lernout & Hauspie assets, the company moved into the speech recognition business and began to compete with Nuance. Lernout & Hauspie had acquired speech recognition company Dragon Systems in June 2001, shortly before becoming bankrupt in October. Scansoft acquired speech recognition company SpeechWorks in 2003.

=== Partnership with Siri and Apple Inc. ===
In 2013, Nuance confirmed that its natural language processing algorithms supported Apple's Siri voice assistant.

=== Focus on health care ===
In 2019, Nuance spun off its automotive division as the company Cerence, allowing it to focus on health care applications.

=== Acquisition by Microsoft ===
On April 12, 2021, Microsoft announced that it would buy Nuance Communications for $19.7 billion, or $56 a share, a 22% increase over the previous closing price. Nuance's CEO, Mark Benjamin, stayed with the company. This was Microsoft's second-biggest acquisition up to that point, after its purchase of LinkedIn for $24 billion (~$31.5 billion in 2025) in 2016. Shortly after the deal, the Competition and Markets Authority, a UK regulatory body, stated it was looking into the deal on the basis of antitrust concerns. In December 2021, it was reported that the deal would be approved by the European Union. The acquisition was completed on March 4, 2022.

In May 2023, Nuance announced an unspecified number of layoffs.

== See also ==
- Caere Corporation, whom ScanSoft/Nuance acquired in 2000
- Optical character recognition
- DocuWare
- SharePoint
