= Visioneer =

American technology company

Visioneer, Inc. is a privately owned technology company based in Fremont, California, with offices in Canada and the Netherlands. Visioneer is a developer of intelligent document capture solutions, including hardware and software products. Visioneer is a Xerox licensee, licensed to build, sell and support stand-alone document scanners.

Founded in March 1992 by Pierre-Alain Cotte, Visioneer introduced a sheetfed scanner called the PaperMax. The scanner weighed just 2.5 pounds and fit between a keyboard and monitor. A typical document could be scanned in about six seconds.

Visioneer's proprietary software application known as PaperPort was spun off and sold in 1998. The hardware side of the business was sold to Primax Electronics in January 1999, but later bought back by a private investor. In March 1999, Visioneer acquired ScanSoft from Xerox to form a new public software company with ScanSoft as the new company-wide name.

In August 2003, Visioneer announced an exclusive licensing agreement with Xerox to develop and market Xerox-branded document scanners. In 2005, Visioneer acquired JFL Peripherals. Visioneer launched the RoadWarrior line of mobile scanners in 2006 and integrated Kofax VRS technology into their mobile scanners in 2007.

In 2021, Visioneer launched Visioneer VAST Network technology, a collection of network, cloud and mobile document capture solutions for Visioneer and Xerox brand scanners. Visioneer VAST Network is an extended implementation of TWAIN Direct.

== See also ==
- Nuance Communications - ScanSoft and Nuance Communications merged in 2005.
