= OmniPage =

- Developer: Tungsten Automation (formerly Kofax)
- Stable release: 22.2 (Windows); 22.1 (Mac); 22.0 (Linux)
- Operating system: Windows 11; Windows 10; Windows Server 2022; Windows Server 2019; Windows Server 2016; Windows Server 2012 R2; macOS 13.3; macOS 12.6.4; macOS 11.7.5; Debian 11.x; Debian 10.x; Ubuntu 22.04 LTS; Ubuntu 20.04 LTS; Ubuntu 18.04 LTS; Fedora Linux 36; Fedora Linux 35; CentOS Stream 9.x; Red Hat Enterprise Linux server 8.x; Red Hat Enterprise Linux server 7.x; Oracle Linux 8.x; Oracle Linux 7.x
- Type: OCR
- License: Commercial proprietary software (Retail or volume licensing)
- Website: www.tungstenautomation.com/Products/omnipage

OmniPage is an optical character recognition (OCR) application available from Tungsten Automation.

OmniPage was one of the first OCR programs to run on personal computers. It was developed in the late 1980s and sold by Caere Corporation, a company headed by Robert Noyce. The original developers were Philip Bernzott, John Dilworth, David George, Bryan Higgins, and Jeremy Knight. Caere was acquired by ScanSoft in 2000. ScanSoft acquired Nuance Communications in 2005, and took over its name. By 2019 OmniPage had been sold to Kofax Inc. On January 16, 2024, Kofax was renamed to Tungsten Automation.

OmniPage supports more than 120 different languages. OmniPage provides software development kits for integrating OCR functionality into other applications, such as Microsoft Office Document Imaging and UiPath.
