= Autokon =

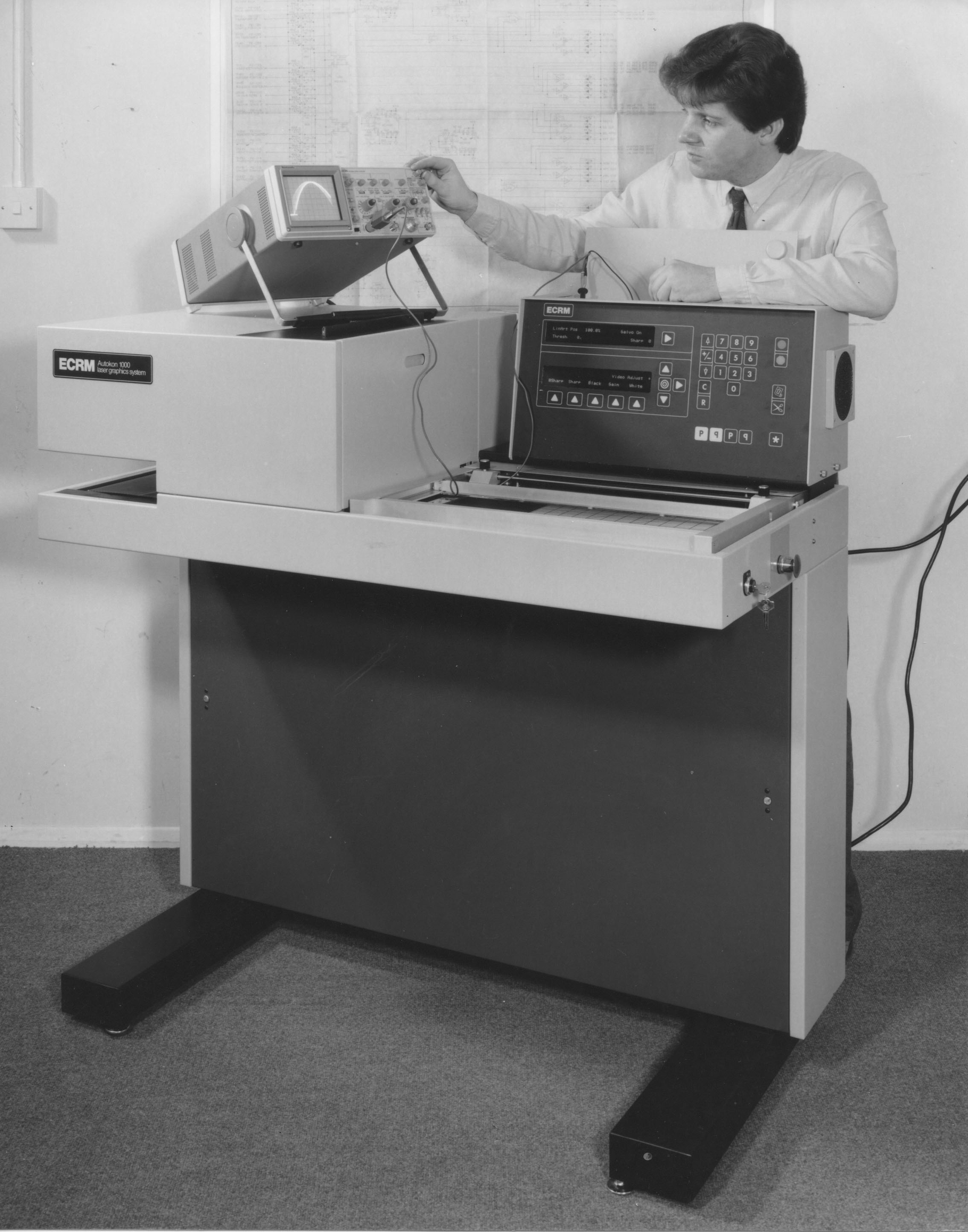
- Autokon 1000/DE
- Manufacturer: ECRM, Inc.
- Introduced: 1975; 50 years ago
- Type: Image scanner (flatbed)
- Connection: SCSI (some models, aftermarket)
- Dots per inch: 1000–2000 (lines per inch)

Autokon is a discontinued line of image scanners sold by ECRM Inc., a subsidiary of AM International, from the 1970s to the 1990s. The inaugural Autokon 8400, introduced in 1975, was the first flatbed scanner used for digital image processing. In the print industry, the Autokon was considered a milestone in the transition to from manual to electronic pagination. Numerous models were released over the span of two decades, and the Autokon line as a whole enjoyed widespread use in the newspapers and prepress industries, becoming a de facto standard for image scanners in the time before the desktop publishing revolution of the mid-1980s.

== History ==
The Autokon 8400, introduced in 1975, used a laser beam to scan pages up to 11 by 14 inches at a maximum resolution of 1000 lines per inch. Although it was only capable of scanning in 1-bit monochrome, the on-board processor was capable of halftoning, unsharp masking, contrast adjustment, and anamorphic distortions, among other features. The Autokon 8400 could either be connected to a film recorder to create a negative for producing plates or connected to a mainframe or minicomputer for further image processing and digital storage. The Autokon 8400 enjoyed widespread use in newspapers—ECRM shipped 1,000 units to newspaper publishers by 1985—but its limited resolution and maximum scan size made it unsuitable for commercial printing.

In 1982, ECRM introduced the Autokon 8500, capable of scanning up to 1200 lines per inch. Four of ECRM's competitors introduced commercial flatbed scanners that year, including Scitex, Agfa-Gevaert, and Linotype-Hell, all of which were capable of scanning larger prints at higher resolutions. The Autokon 1000, introduced in 1984, came to support scanning up to 2000 lines per inch as well as the ability to scan in color with hardware enhancements. The Autokon 1000 gained support for connecting to personal computers in 1988 when ECRM announced a kit for the Macintosh II, comprising a SCSI buffer expansion board and software, that allowed the Macintosh II to control and ingest image data (formatted as TIFFs) from the Autokon 1000; it supported monochrome data only. ECRM simultaneously announced an add-on raster image processor for the Autokon 1000, allowing it to output PostScript-compliant image data to computers and to printers such as the LaserJet.

In 1988, ECRM introduced the 1000/DE (digital enhancement), which used a microprocessor to produce the sharpening effect as against the 8400 which used analog electronics and an optical method to create sharpening. The Autokon 1000/DE had a touchpad rather than analogue rotary controls. The Autokon 1000/DE had applications in both commercial and newspaper environments where only a single halftone was required, i.e. black and white. While typically the Autokon 8400 was a standalone output device that scanned and then output to either photosensitive, roll format bromide paper or film, the Autokon 1000/DE was often connected to Macintoshes or IBM PC compatibles via a dedicated interface such as those from HighWater Designs. The last Autokon was a wider format, online-only device which utilized both a red and green laser to improve the response to the scanning of color photographs.

ECRM continued selling Autokons into 1995. The line disappeared from the company's catalog between then and 1998. After selling its remaining platesetter assets to Kodak in 2021, ECRM quietly dissolved.

== See also ==
- Datacopy Model 700, the first flatbed scanner for the IBM Personal Computer
- History of image scanners
