= Scanner Access Now Easy =

Open source scanner application programming interface

SANE
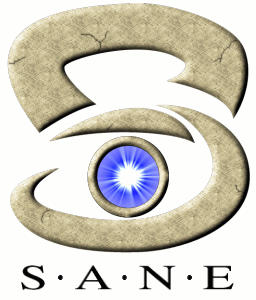

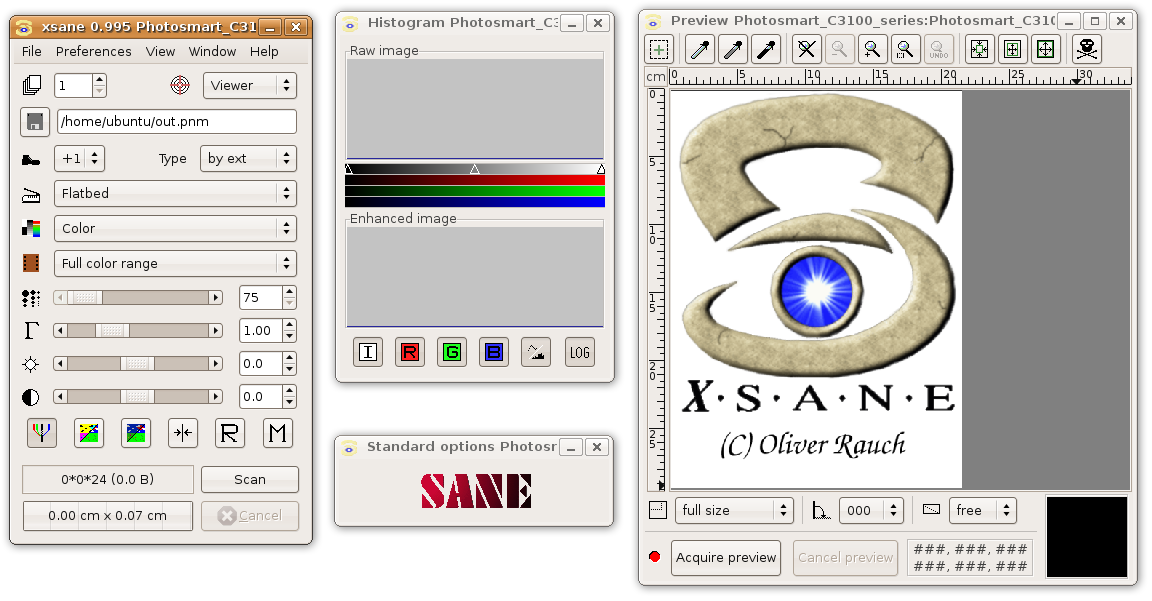
- XSane on Ubuntu (Linux)
- Original authors: David Mosberger-Tang; Andy Beck
- Initial release: November 27, 1996; 29 years ago
- Stable release: 1.4.0 / 23 May 2025; 11 months ago
- Operating system: Microsoft Windows, Linux, UNIX, OS/2
- License: GNU GPLv2 or later (frontend programs), weakened GPLv2 or later (backend libraries), public domain (SANE standard: API & network protocol)
- Website: www.sane-project.org
- Repository: gitlab.com/sane-project

Scanner Access Now Easy (SANE) is an open-source application programming interface (API) that provides standardized access to any raster image scanner hardware (flatbed scanner, handheld scanner, video- and still-cameras, frame grabbers, etc.). The SANE API is public domain. It is commonly used on Linux.

== Architecture ==
SANE differs from the TWAIN scanning APIs in that it is cleanly separated into frontend and backend (user programs and scanner drivers, respectively). Whereas a TWAIN driver handles the user interface as well as communications with the scanner hardware, a SANE driver only provides an interface with the hardware and describes a number of "options" which drive each scan. These options specify parameters such as the resolution of the scan, the scan area, colour model, etc. Each option has a name, and information about its type, units, and range or possible values (e.g., enumerated list). By convention there are several "well known" options that frontends can supply using convenient GUI interaction e.g., the scan area options can be set by dragging a rectangular outline over a preview image. Other options can be presented using GUI elements appropriate to their type e.g., sliders, drop-down lists, etc.

One consequence of this separation is that network scanning is easily implemented with no special handling in either the front ends or back ends. On a host with a scanner, the saned daemon runs and handles network requests. On client machines a "net" backend (driver) connects to the remote host to fetch the scanner options, and perform previews and scans. The saned daemon acts as a frontend locally, but simply passes requests and data between the network connections and the local scanner. Similarly, the "net" backend passes requests and data between the local frontend and the remote host.

Various types of unsupervised batch scanning are also possible with a minimum of support needed in the backend (driver). Many scanners support the attachment of document feeders which allow a large number of sheets of paper to be automatically scanned in succession. Using the SANE API, the frontend simply has to "play back" the same set of options for each scan, driving the document feed in between scans to load the next sheet of paper. The frontend only has to obtain the set of options from the user once.

== Graphical user interfaces ==
Several user interfaces have been written to combine SANE with an easy user method of controlling it.

=== gscan2pdf ===
gscan2pdf is an interface for scanning documents to PDF on the GNOME desktop that uses SANE to communicate with the scanner. It is available under the GPL. It includes common editing tools, e.g., for rotating or cropping pages. It is also able to perform OCR using several optional OCR tools and save a searchable PDF. PDF files can be further downsampled upon saving.

=== NAPS2 ===
NAPS2 is free and open source scanning software for Windows 7+ (x64, x86), macOS 10.15+ (x64, arm64) and Linux (x64, arm64) (GTK 3.20+, glibc 2.27+, libsane). The supported file formats are PDF, TIFF, JPEG, or PNG. Optical character recognition (OCR) is available using Tesseract.

=== Simple Scan ===
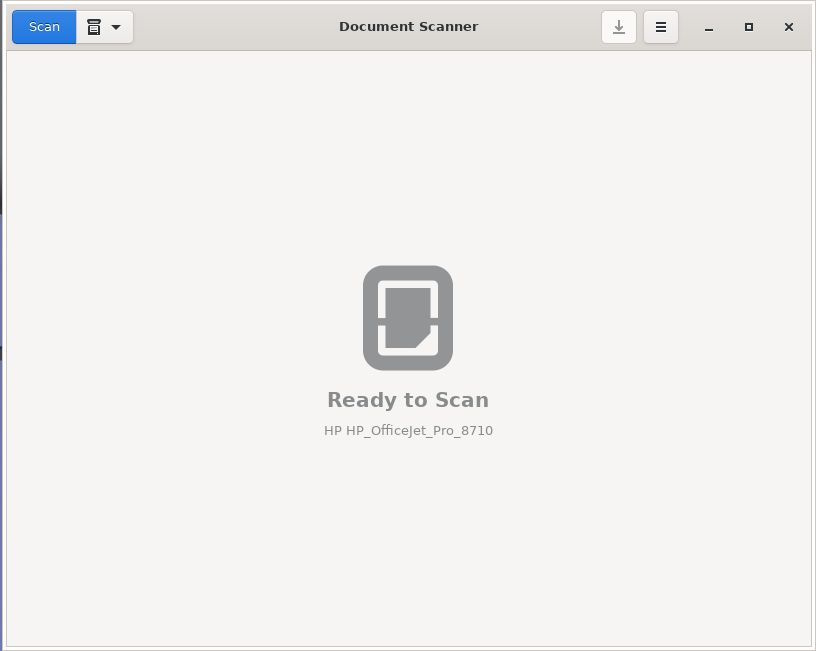
Simple Scan (also called GNOME Document Scanner)

Simple Scan is a simplified GUI using SANE that is intended to be easier to use and better integrate into the GNOME desktop than XSane. It was initially written for Ubuntu and is maintained by Robert Ancell of Canonical Ltd. for Linux. Simple Scan was first fielded as part of Ubuntu 10.04 Lucid Lynx and is also used in Lubuntu (until Lubuntu 18.04 LTS) and Xubuntu. It is now part of the GNOME project.

=== Skanlite ===
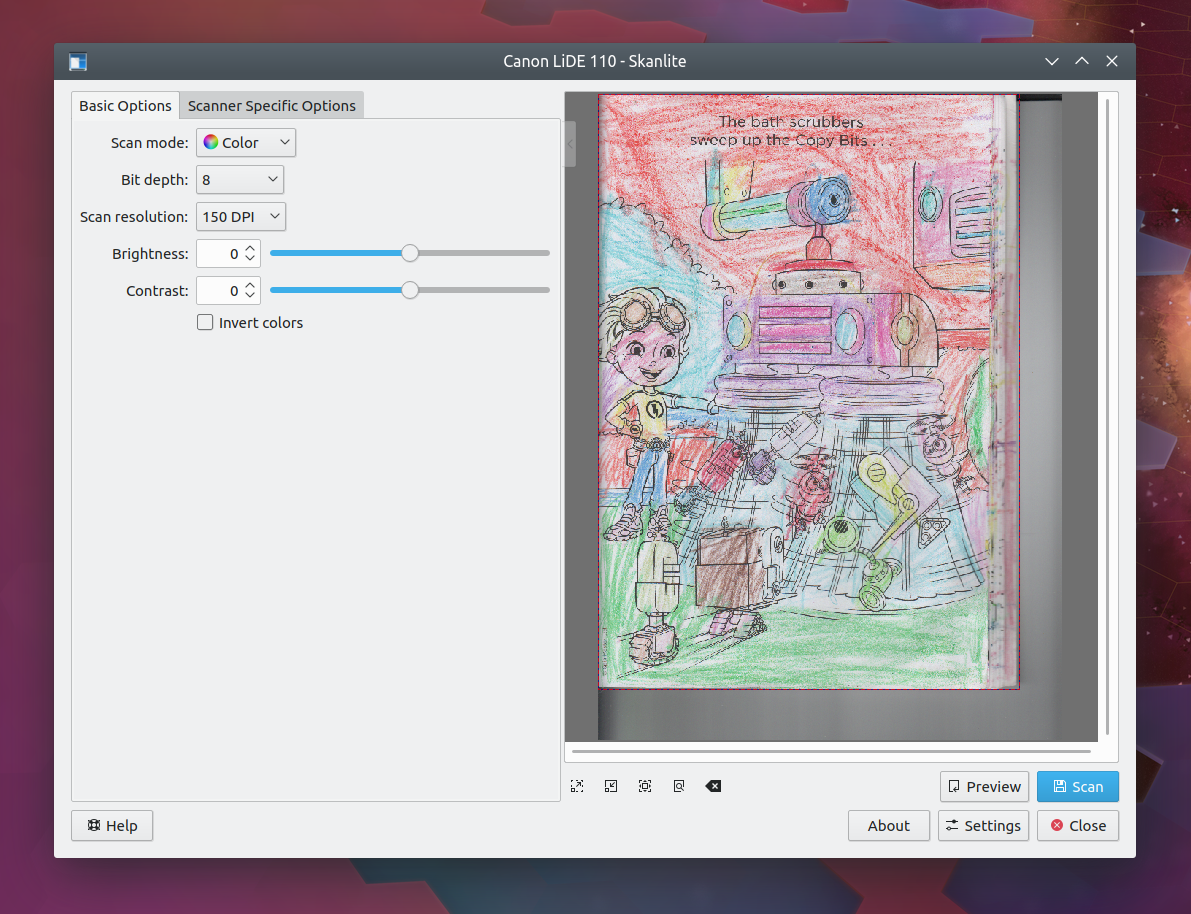
SkanLite

Skanlite is a simple image scanning application, based on the KSane backend. Kåre Särs is the lead developer. In KDE 4 Skanlite replaced Kooka of KDE 3 as default KDE scanning application.

Skanlite is based on libksane, an interface provided by KDE for SANE libraries to control flatbed scanners. It also works with networked scanners.

=== SwingSane ===
SwingSane is a cross-platform, Java front end for SANE, written and maintained by Roland Quast. It is available for Microsoft Windows, Linux, Mac OS X and is licensed under the Apache 2.0 License. The source code for the project can also be adapted for use with an existing Swing application.

=== XSane ===
XSane is a graphical front end for SANE written by Oliver Rauch. It is available for Microsoft Windows, Linux, UNIX, and OS/2 and is licensed under the GNU General Public License (GPL). The Windows version only allows a Windows computer to access a scanner that is attached to a Unix, OS/2 or Mac OS X network computer, but not generally to the local Windows computer. Only the "complete" sane-back-ends versions will possibly work with some scanner models connected locally.

== See also ==
- Image and Scanner Interface Specification (ISIS) – Open industry standard interface
- Windows Image Acquisition (WIA) – Proprietary API from Microsoft
