= AM Jacquard Systems =

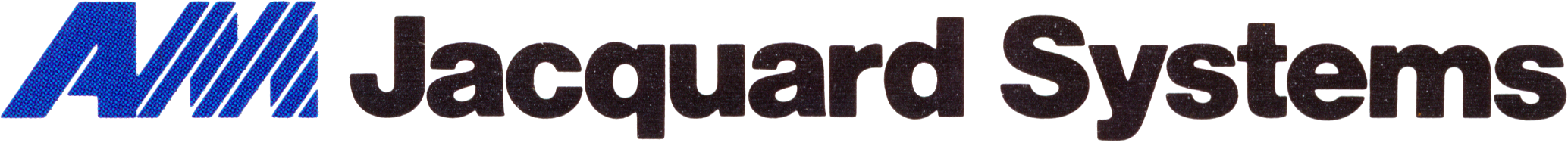
- Company type: Private
- Industry: Computers
- Headquarters: Santa Monica, California
- Area served: USA
- Key people: Robert Rollo
- Products: J100 Videocomputer and J500 Videocomputer

AM Jacquard Systems, originally Jacquard Systems, was an American manufacturer and vendor of small office computer systems in the late 1970s and early 1980s. The systems were sold with Type-Rite, a word processing system and Data-Rite, a data management system. They also offered specialist software, Tomcat to legal firms.

The original J100 Videocomputer, a "shared logic" system was joined by the single user J500 Videocomputer.

Jacquard was acquired by AM International, inventors of the addressograph, where it was seen to complement their range of phototypesetters. Jacquard then also became the sales and marketing arm for the parent company's Amtext system.

The corporate headquarters were at 3340 Ocean Park Boulevard, Santa Monica, California.

== Subsidiaries ==
- Addressograph-Farrington, based in Randolph, Massachusetts
- ECRM Inc.
