= Patch Code =

Type of barcode

Patch Code is a barcode developed by Kodak for use in automated scanning.

== Symbology ==
A Patch Code consists of two wide bars (0.2 inches (5.1 mm) ± 0.01 inches (0.25 mm)) and two narrow bars (0.08 inches (2.0 mm)). The bars are separated by three narrow spaces, so the Patch Code symbols are a fixed length. There are six distinct permutations of the wide and narrow bars, so there are six Patch Codes. The patches are called:

- Patch 2, WNNW, assigns image level 2 to the current document
- Patch 3, WNWN, assigns image level 3 to the current document
- Patch T, NWNW, assigns predefined image level to the next document (transfer patch)
- Patch 1, WWNN, used for post scan image control
- Patch 4, NWWN, used for post scan image control (toggle patch)
- Patch 6, NNWW, used for post scan image control

The Patch Code needs to be in a specific position on the page, but that position may vary with the image scanner used. The Patch Code is usually close to feed edge of the scanner. That way, the Patch Code can be detected early during the paper transport. Patch Codes are often printed along all four edges of a page. That covers the requirements for many scanners, and it allows the pages to work even if the page is upside down (rotated 180 degrees).

Sometimes, the Patch Code is the only information on a page. That is, the page is only used for controlling a scan. In that situation, the scanner may just take the required action and not transfer the Patch Code image to the computer.

== Application ==
The Patch Codes aid in batch scanning of documents to tell capture software or content management software how to classify or organize documents. Several documents may need to be scanned, and each document should end up in a separate file. Instead of running three separate jobs (loading the scanner with each document separately), the documents are loaded into the scanner with a Patch 2 separating each document. When the scanner encounters a Patch 2, then the scanner starts copying the scans to the next file.

The California tax return Form 540 had a Patch 2 on its first page. Several tax returns could be loaded into the scanner, and each return would be scanned into a separate file.

Some scanning jobs may have different imaging requirements. Most of a document may have black and white pages, but there may be some color pages once in a while. Patch 4 (toggle patch) can be used to switch in and out of color scanning. Before scanning, the document is prepared by inserting pages that only have a Patch 4 on them before and after the color sections. The scan starts out in black and white. When the first toggle patch is encountered, the following pages are scanned in color. When the second toggle is encountered, the following pages are scanned in black and white. The toggle patch may also be used to switch between scanning resolutions, bit depth (grayscale), and one-sided or two-sided scanning.

The actions taken for Patch 2, Patch 3, and Patch T can be configured in a document scanning application. Kodak's Capture Software assigns these default actions:

- Patch 3 creates a new job and throws away the image with the patch
- Patch 2 starts a new document and keeps the image
- Patch T starts an attachment and throws away the image.

== Interface ==
TWAIN has a facility for Patch Codes.
