= Contact image sensor =

Type of image sensor

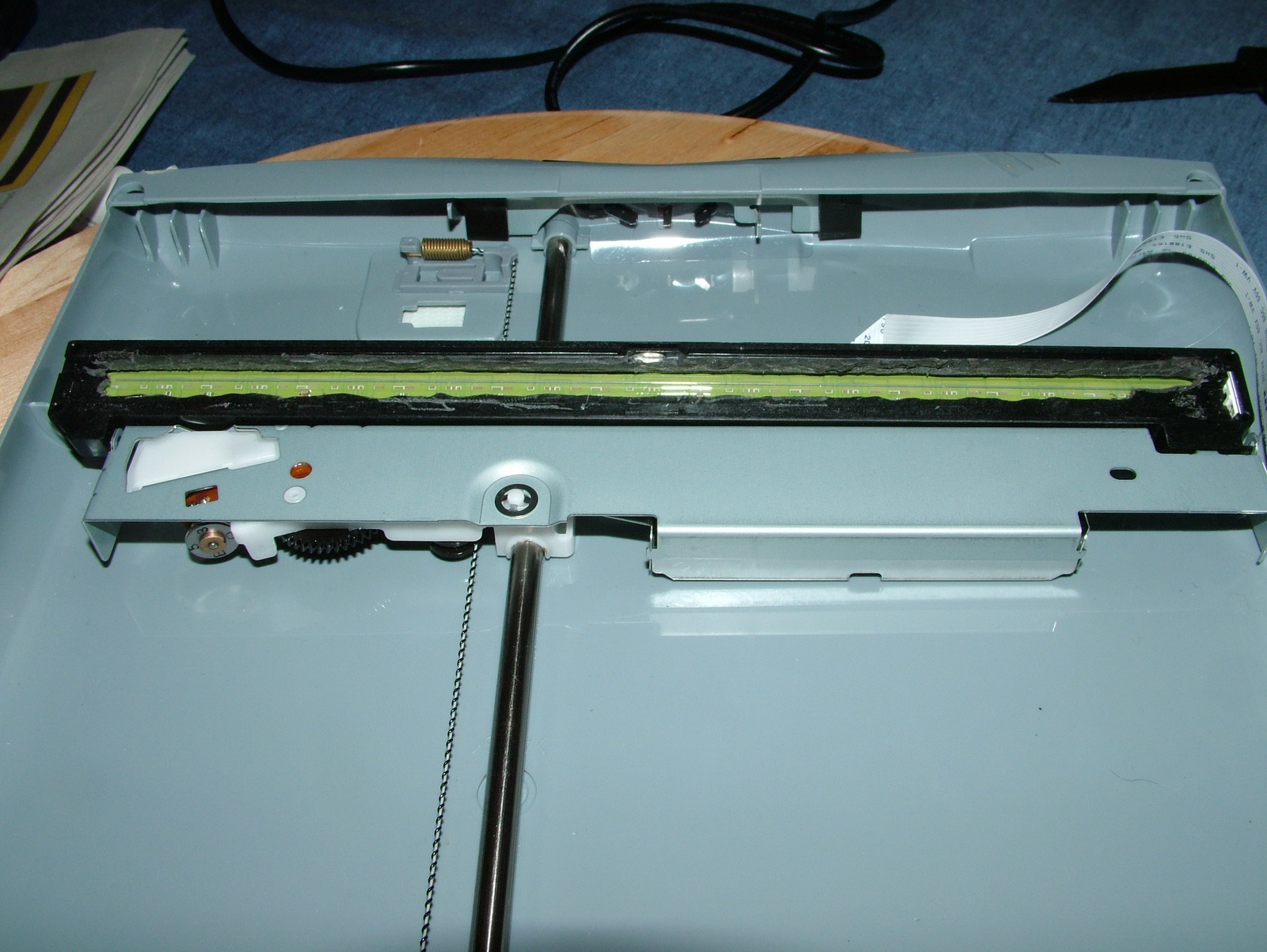
CIS of a flatbed scanner

Contact image sensors (CIS) are image sensors used in flatbed scanners almost in direct contact with the object to be scanned. Charge-coupled devices (CCDs), the other kind of sensor often used in scanners, use mirrors to bounce light to a stationary sensor. Scanners using CISs are much smaller than ones that use CCDs, use typically a tenth as much power, and are particularly suitable for low power and portable applications, often powered over USB.

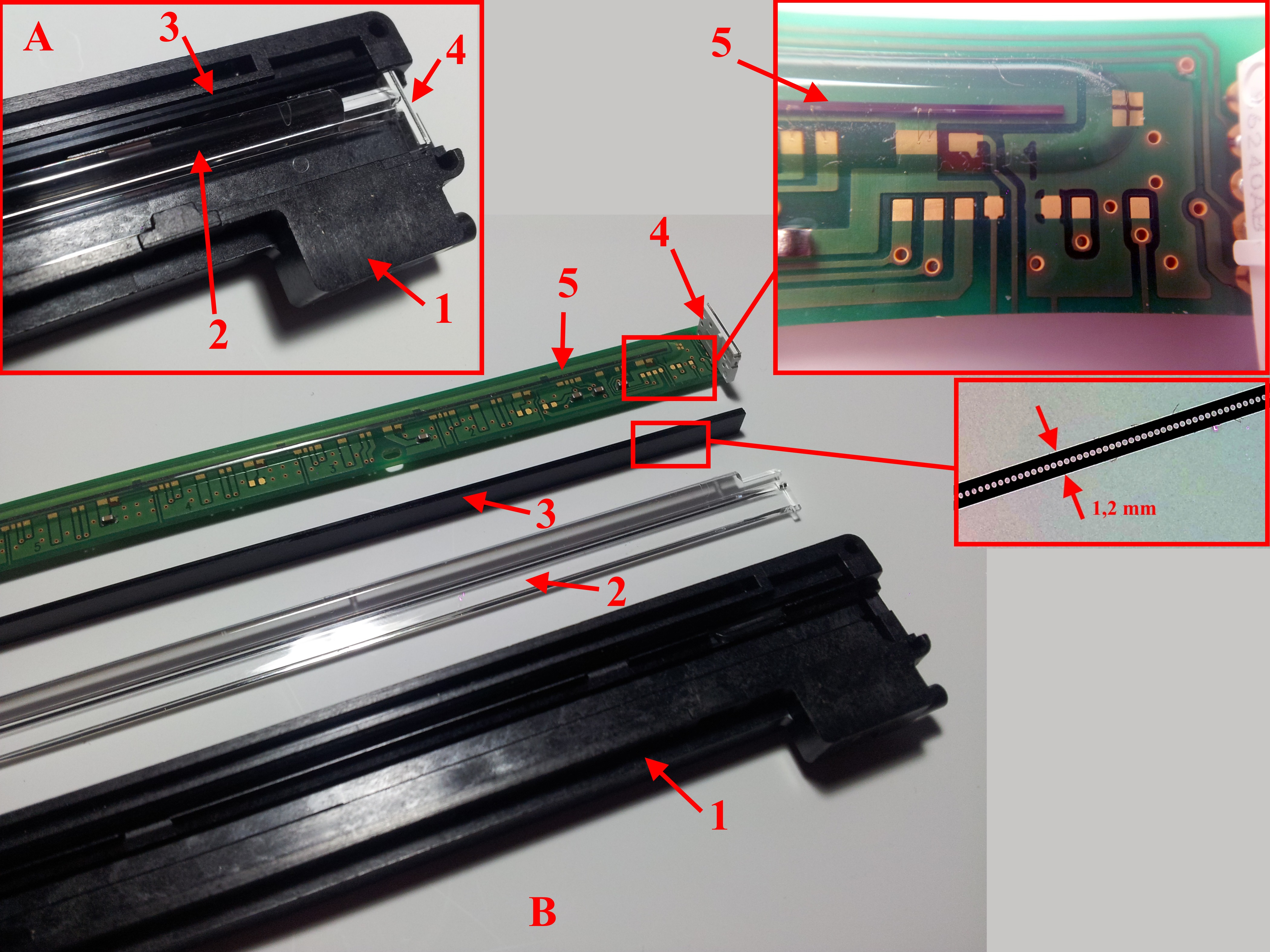
Scanner unit with CIS. A: assembled, B: disassembled; 1: housing, 2: light conductor, 3: lenses, 4: chip with two RGB-LEDs, 5: CIS

A CIS typically consists of a linear array of detectors, covered by focusing lenses and flanked by red, green, and blue LEDs for illumination. The use of LEDs allows the CIS to be highly power efficient, allowing scanners to be powered through the minimal line voltage supplied via a USB connection. CIS devices typically produce lower image quality compared to CCD devices; in particular, the depth of field is greatly limited, which poses a problem for material that is not perfectly flat. However, a CIS contact sensor is smaller and lighter than a CCD line sensor, and allows all the necessary optical elements to be included in a compact module, thus helping to simplify the inner structure of the scanner. With a CIS contact sensor, the scanner can be portable, with a height of only around 30 mm. CIS is a key component widely used in scanners (especially portable scanners), electrographs, bar code readers and optical identification technology.

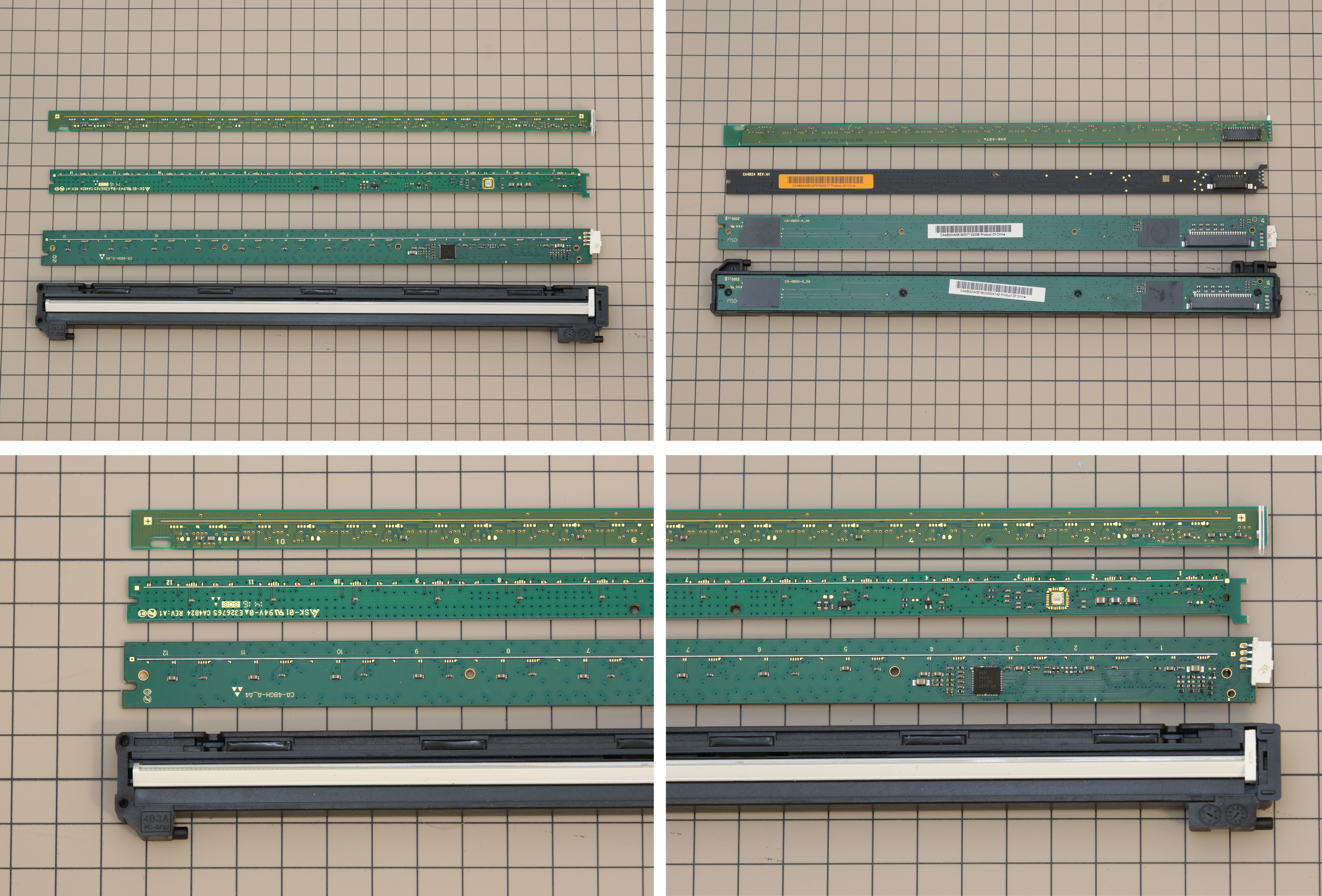
Internals of three contact image sensors used in multifunction printers from different manufacturers, showing differences in construction
