= Drum scanner =

Type of image scanner

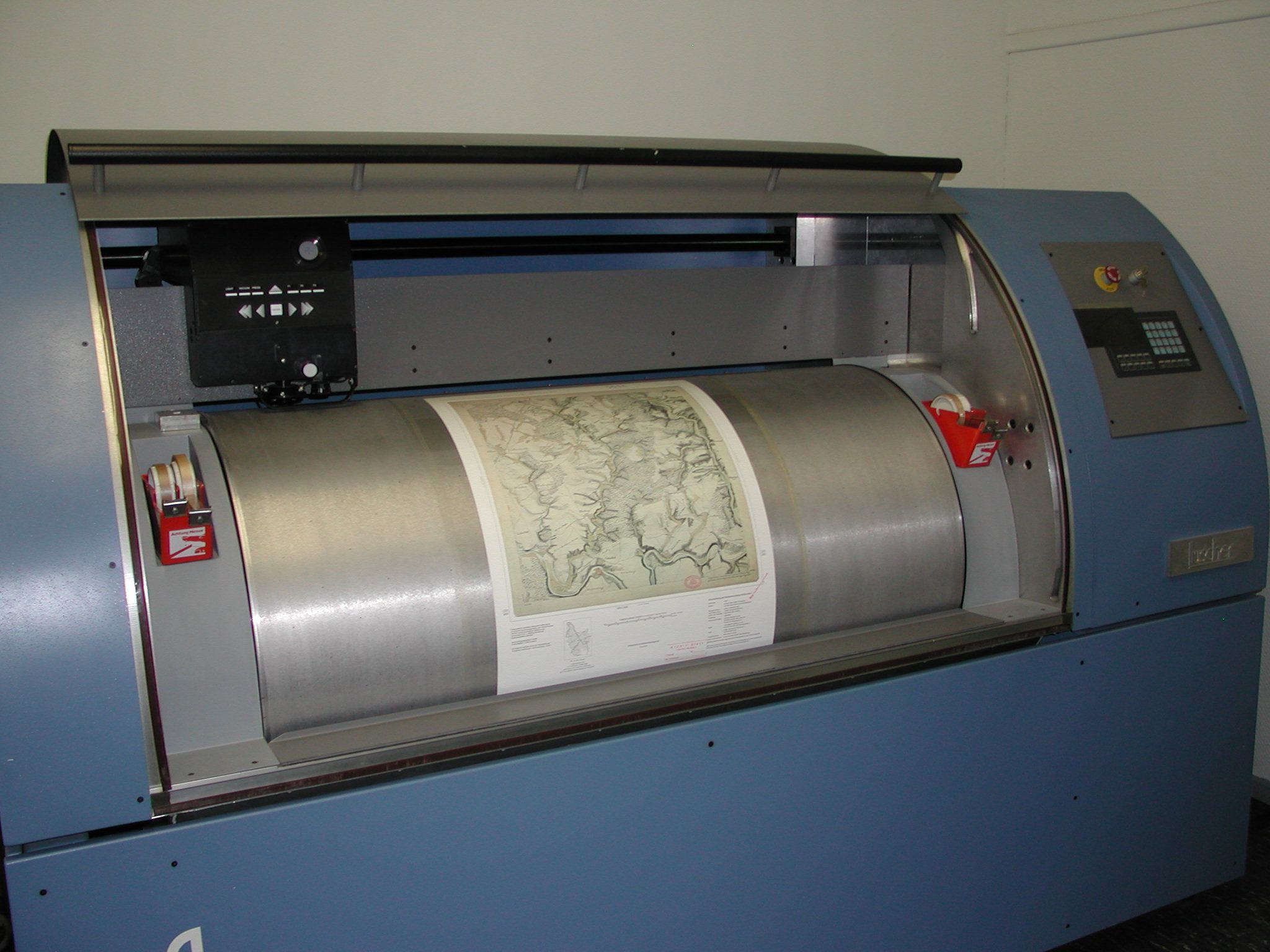
A drum scanner from the 1990s, built by Lüscher Technologies

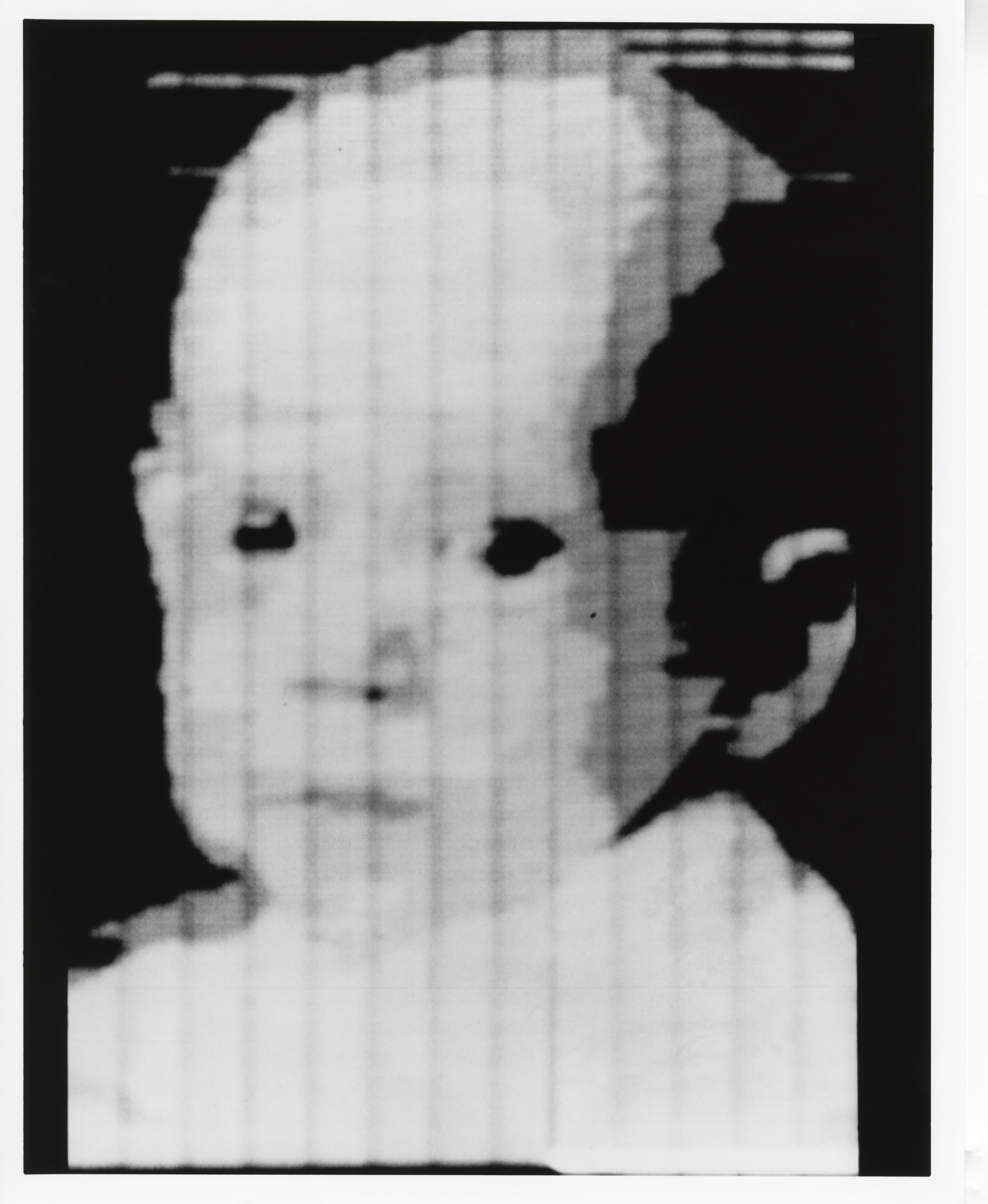
The first digital image ever stored on a computer, of Russell A. Kirsch's newborn son, Walden (1957), was captured using a drum scanner.

Drum scanners are a type of image scanner that capture image information, with the scanning performed along one axis by mechanically rotating a cylindrical drum (with the image attached) past a stationary optical pickup. The second axis is scanned by a much slower mechanical motion of either the drum or the pickup parallel to the cylinder axis using a lead screw mechanism. As the process involves a uniform (non-accelerating) rotation along one axis and a much slower linear, non-reciprocating motion along the other, mechanical challenges due to vibrations and backlash are largely eliminated, making it easy to achieve high speeds and precision using rather undemanding mechanisms. Higher-end drum scanners often employ photomultiplier tubes (PMT) as optical sensors, but there is nothing that precludes the use of other optical sensor types.

"Reflective and transmissive originals are mounted on an acrylic cylinder, the scanner drum, which rotates at high speed while it passes the object being scanned in front of precision optics that deliver image information to the PMTs. Modern color drum scanners use three matched PMTs, which read red, blue, and green light, respectively. Light from the original artwork is split into separate red, blue, and green beams in the optical bench of the scanner with dichroic filters." Photomultipliers offer superior dynamic range and for this reason, drum scanners can extract more detail from very dark shadow areas of a transparency than flatbed scanners using CCD sensors. The smaller dynamic range of the CCD sensors, versus photomultiplier tubes, can lead to loss of shadow detail, especially when scanning very dense transparency film. While mechanics vary by manufacturer, most drum scanners pass light from halogen lamps though a focusing system to illuminate both reflective and transmissive originals.

== Description ==
The drum scanner gets its name from the clear acrylic cylinder, the drum, on which the original artwork is mounted for scanning. Depending on size, it is possible to mount originals up to 20 by 28 inches (510 mm × 710 mm), but the maximum size varies by manufacturer. "One of the unique features of drum scanners is the ability to control sample area and aperture size independently. The sample size is the area that the scanner encoder reads to create an individual pixel. The aperture is the actual opening that allows light into the optical bench of the scanner. The ability to control aperture and sample size separately are particularly useful for smoothing film grain when scanning black-and-white and color negative originals."

While drum scanners are capable of scanning both reflective and transmissive artwork, a good-quality flatbed scanner can produce good scans from reflective artwork. As a result, drum scanners are rarely used to scan prints now that high-quality, inexpensive flatbed scanners are readily available. Film, however, is where drum scanners continue to be the tool of choice for high-end applications. Because film can be wet-mounted to the scanner drum, which enhances sharpness and masks dust and scratches, and because of the exceptional sensitivity of the PMTs, drum scanners are capable of capturing very subtle details in film originals.

== History ==
The first working fax machine, invented by the English physicist Frederick Bakewell in 1847, was in essence an early drum scanner. Instead of scanning a paper print or transparency using light, however, the revolving drum of Bakewell's machine is coated in tinfoil, with non-conductive ink painted on the foil and a stylus that scans across the drum and sends a pulse down a pair of wires when it contacts a conductive point on the foil. The receiver contains an electrode that touches a sheet of chemically treated paper, which changes color when the electrode receives a pulse; the result is a reverse contrast (white-on-blue) reproduction of the original image. Bakewell's fax machine was marginally more successful than Alexander Bain's original 1843 patent for a fax machine but suffered from the same synchronization issues that plagued Bain.

Alexander Murray and Richard Morse invented and patented the first drum scanner at Eastman Kodak in 1937. Intended for color separation at printing presses, their machine was an analog drum scanner that imaged a color transparency mounted in the drum, with a light source placed underneath the film, and three photocells with red, green, and blue color filters reading each spot on the transparency to translate the image into three electronic signals. In Murray and Morse's initial design, the drum was connected to three lathes that etched cyan, magenta, and yellow (CMY) halftone dots onto three offset cylinders directly. The rights to the patent were sold to Printing Developments Incorporated (P.D.I.) in 1946, who improved on the design by using a photomultiplier tube to image the points on the negative, which produced an amplified signal that was then fed to a single-purpose computer that processed the RGB signals into color-corrected cyan, magenta, yellow, and black (CMYK) values. The processed signals are then sent to four lathes that etch CMYK halftone dots onto the offset cylinders.

The first scanner to store its images digitally onto a computer was a drum scanner built in 1957 at the National Bureau of Standards (NBS, later NIST) by a team led by Russell A. Kirsch. It used a photomultiplier tube to detect light at a given point and produced an amplified signal that a computer could read and store into memory. The computer of choice at the time was the SEAC mainframe; the maximum horizontal resolution that the SEAC was capable of processing was 176 pixels. The first image ever scanned on this machine was a photograph of Kirsch's three-month-old son, Walden.

The situation as of 2014 was that only a few companies continued to manufacture and service drum scanners. While prices of both new and used units dropped from the start of the 21st century, they were still much more costly than CCD flatbed and film scanners. Image quality produced by flatbed scanners had improved to the degree that the best ones were suitable for many graphic-arts operations, and they replaced drum scanners in many cases as they were less expensive and faster. However, drum scanners with their superior resolution (up to 24,000 PPI), color gradation, and value structure continued to be used for scanning images to be enlarged, and for museum-quality archiving of photographs and print production of high-quality books and magazine advertisements. As second-hand drum scanners became more plentiful and less costly, many fine-art photographers acquired them.

== See also ==
- Document camera
