= Anamorphic stretch transform =

An anamorphic stretch transform (AST) also referred to as warped stretch transform is a physics-inspired signal transform that emerged from time stretch dispersive Fourier transform. The transform can be applied to analog temporal signals such as communication signals, or to digital spatial data such as images. The transform reshapes the data in such a way that its output has properties conducive for data compression and analytics. The reshaping consists of warped stretching in the Fourier domain. The name "Anamorphic" is used because of the metaphoric analogy between the warped stretch operation and warping of images in anamorphosis and surrealist artworks.

== Operation principle ==
An anamorphic stretch transform (AST) is a mathematical transformation in which analog or digital data is stretched and warped in a context-aware manner, such that it results in nonuniform Fourier domain sampling. The transformation is defined as:

$AST \left \{\tilde{E}_{in}(\omega) \right \} = \int_{-\infty}^\infty {\tilde{E}_{in}^*(\omega)\tilde{E}_{in}(\omega+\omega_m) e^{j\omega_m\left [\frac{\phi(\omega+\omega_m)-\phi(\omega)}{\omega_m} \right ]} d\omega}$

where $\tilde{E}_{in}(\omega)$ is the input optical spectrum, $\phi(\omega)$ is the spectral phase added by AST ($e^{j\phi(\omega)}$ being the AST warp kernel), and $\omega$ and $\omega_m$ denote the optical and envelope modulation frequencies, respectively. The detailed of the reshaping depends on the sparsity and redundancy of the input signal and can be obtained by a mathematical function, which is called "stretched modulation $(S_M)$ distribution" or "modulation intensity distribution" (not to be confused with a different function of the same name used in mechanical diagnostics).

$S_M \left (\omega_m ,T\right ) = \int_{-\infty}^\infty {\tilde{E}_{in}^*(\omega)\tilde{E}_{in}(\omega+\omega_m) e^{j\omega_m\left [\frac{\phi(\omega+\omega_m)-\phi(\omega)}{\omega_m} \right ]}e^{j\omega T} d\omega}$

The stretched modulation distribution is a 3D representation of a type of bilinear time–frequency distribution similar, but not the same, as other time-frequency distributions. One can interpret the added phasor term $e^{j\omega T}$ to represent the effect of a time-shift on the spectral autocorrelation of the signal. As a result, the $S_M$ distribution can be used to show the effects of the AST spectral phase $\phi(\omega)$ on the temporal duration and intensity envelope bandwidth of the output signal, which is useful in visualizing the time-bandwidth product of the signal.

== Sparsity requirement ==
AST applies a tailored group dispersion to different spectral features. By matching the group delay dispersion to the spectrum of the particular signal of interest, it performs frequency to time mapping in a tailored fashion. Information rich portions of the spectrum are stretched in time more than sparse regions of the spectrum making them easier to capture with a real-time analog-to-digital converter (ADC), similar to the methodology used in time-stretch ADC technology. This property has been called "self-adaptive stretching". Because the operation is specific to the spectrum of the signal, it does not require knowledge about the instantaneous time domain behavior of the signal. Hence no real-time adaptive control is needed. The parameters of AST are designed using the statistical spectral (not instantaneous) property of signal family of interest in the target application. Once the parameters are designed, they do not need to respond to the instantaneous value of the signal. The resulting non-uniform sampling, where information rich portions of the signal are sampled at a higher rate than the sparse regions, can be exploited for data compression. As any other data compression method, the maximum compression that can be achieved using AST is signal dependent.

== Limitations and challenges ==
The reconstruction accuracy and lossy nature of this compression method have been analyzed previously. The system reshapes the spectro-temporal structure of the signal such that nearly all the signal energy is within the bandwidth of the real-time digitizer of the acquisition system. Because of the limited bandwidth and the limited resolution of the digitizer, as measured by its effective number of bits (ENOB), the reconstruction will never be ideal, and therefore, this is a lossy compression method. Because of this, only modest compression can be achieved in practice.

Alternatively, the reconstruction process can be greatly simplified if the information desired is encoded in the spectral envelope of the input signal instead of the temporal envelope. In such a scenario, the true output can be reconstructed simply by directly de-warping the measured output given the designed warp kernel. This has been achieved experimentally for optical image compression.

== Digital implementation ==
In the digital implementation of AST (DAST) that is performed in 2D and applied to digital images, an appropriately designed warp kernel stretches the input in a way that reduces the overall spatial bandwidth and hence the sampling requirement. The previous equation for AST can be rewritten in discrete form for DAST as: $\breve{B}[n,m] = \left|\sum_{k_1,k_2=-\infty}^\infty K\left [n-k_1,m-k_2\right ]\cdot B\left [k_1,k_2\right ]\right|^N$,

where $K[n,m]= e^{j\phi[n,m]}$ is the digital version of the warp kernel. Similar to the case of 1-D temporal waveforms, the warped waveform can then be sampled at a lower rate than what was previously possible with naïve uniform downsampling. This property, known as "feature-selective stretching", can be used for digital image compression. There are two challenges in DAST, (1) image reconstruction, and (2) design the warping kernel. The warped mapping is typically performed in the frequency domain. Reconstruction (inverse mapping) of the spatial image via Fourier transform require knowledge of phase in addition to amplitude of the warped image. In the original AST and DAST papers, ideal phase recovery was assumed to show the useful impact of warp transformation. However, as mentioned above, it has also been shown that phase recovery and signal reconstruction depends on the signal to noise ratio (SNR). Finite SNR will compromise the quality of phase recovery and data compression. Because of this challenge, practical implementation of anamorphic data compression is not achieved yet. With respect to the challenge of finding the right kernel, an algorithm has recently been reported.

Similar to the simplified reconstruction approach above mentioned above, a digital implementation for image compression which uses direct warping has also been recently reported. In this alternative data compression method, information-rich portions of the data are dilated in a process that emulates the effect of group velocity dispersion on temporal signals. With this coding operation, the data can be downsampled at a lower rate than without it, even when considering the overhead in transmitting the warping information. In contrast to previous implementation of the warped stretch compression, here the decoding can be performed without the need of phase recovery.

== Relation to phase stretch transform ==
The phase stretch transform or PST is a computational approach to signal and image processing. One of its utilities is for feature detection and classification. Both phase stretch transform and AST transform the image by emulating propagation through a diffractive medium with engineered 3D dispersive property (refractive index). The difference between the two mathematical operations is that AST uses the magnitude of the complex amplitude after transformation but phase stretch transform employs the phase of the complex amplitude after transformation. Also, the details of the filter kernel are different in the two cases.

== Applications ==
=== Image compression ===
Anamorphic (warped) stretch transform is a physics-based mathematical operation that reduces the signal bandwidth without proportionally increasing the size of the signal, thus providing space-bandwidth product compression. Its digital implementation emulates the physical effect by a non-uniform allocation of pixel density. This operation may be used as a pre-processing operation that may enhance conventional image compression techniques.

=== Time domain signals ===
This lossy transformation may make it possible to capture and digitize signals that are faster than the speed of the sensor and the digitizer, and also to minimize the volume of the data generated in the process. The transformation causes the signal to be reshaped is such a way that sharp features are stretched (in Fourier domain) more than coarse features. Upon subsequent uniform sampling this causes more digital samples to be allocated to sharp spectral features where they are needed the most, and fewer to sparse portions of the spectrum where they would be redundant. The reconstruction accuracy is subject to the signal to noise ratio and will never be ideal.

== See also ==
- Phase stretch transform
