= Image scanner =

Device that optically scans images, printed text

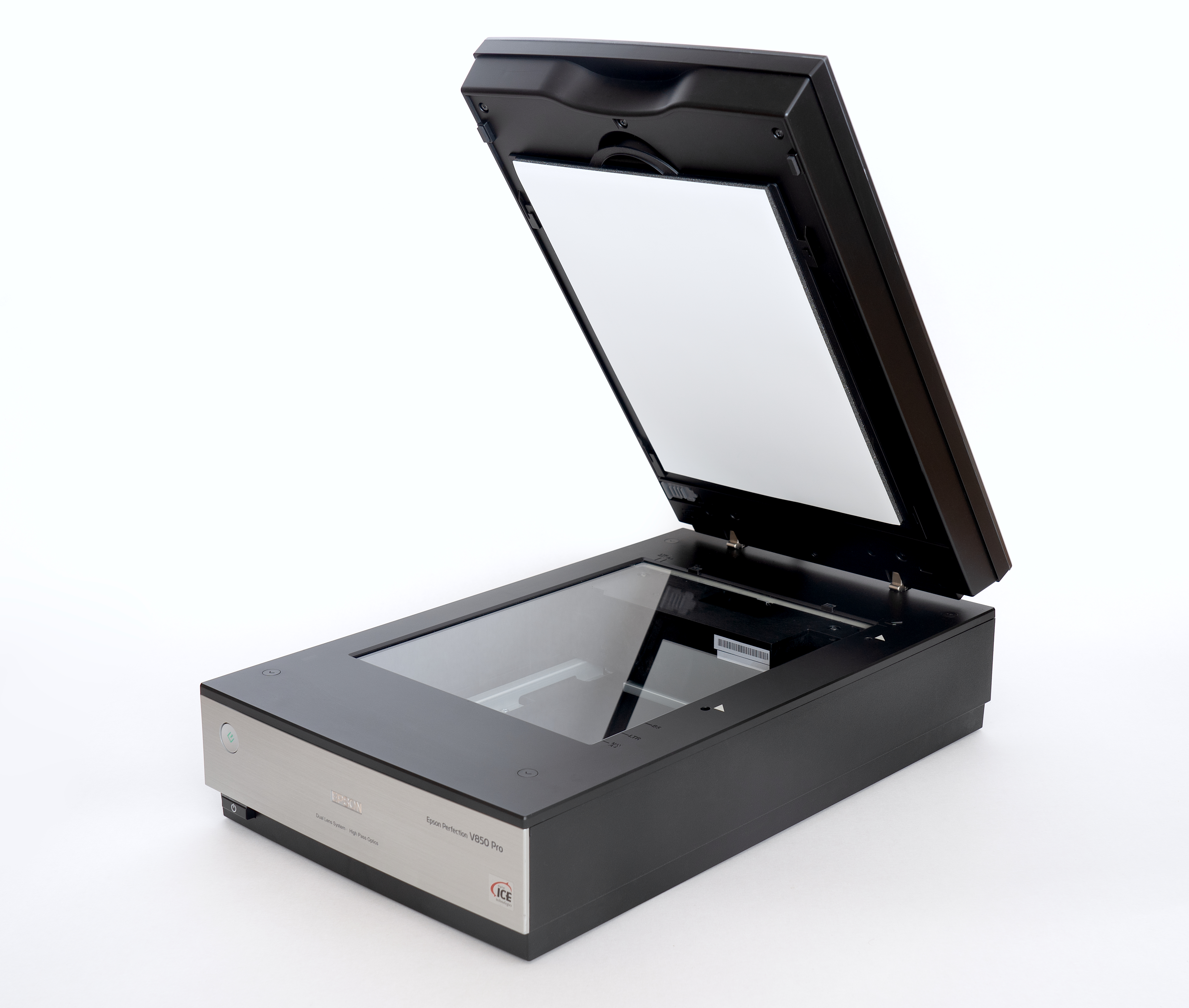
A flatbed scanner (Epson Perfection V850 Pro) with its lid open. Documents or images are placed face-down on the glass bed (the platen).

An image scanner (often abbreviated to just scanner) is a device that optically scans images, printed text, handwriting, or an object and converts it to a digital image. The most common type of scanner used in the home and the office is the flatbed scanner, where the document is placed on a glass bed. A sheetfed scanner, which moves the page across an image sensor using a series of rollers, may be used to scan one page of a document at a time or multiple pages, as in an automatic document feeder. A handheld scanner is a portable version of an image scanner that can be used on any flat surface. Scans are typically downloaded to the computer that the scanner is connected to, although some scanners are able to store scans on standalone flash media (e.g., memory cards and USB drives).

Modern scanners typically use a charge-coupled device (CCD) or a contact image sensor (CIS) as the image sensor, whereas drum scanners, developed earlier and still used for the highest possible image quality, use a photomultiplier tube (PMT) as the image sensor. Document cameras, which use commodity or specialized high-resolution cameras, photograph documents all at once.

== History ==
=== Precursors ===
==== Fax and wirephoto ====
Image scanners are considered the successors of early facsimile (fax) and wirephoto machines. Unlike scanners, these devices were used to transmit images over long distances rather than for processing and storing images locally. The earliest attempt at a fax machine was patented in 1843 by the Scottish clockmaker Alexander Bain but never put into production. In his design, a metal stylus linked to a pendulum scans across a copper plate with a raised image. When the stylus makes contact with a raised part of the plate, it sends a pulse across a pair of wires to a receiver containing an electrode linked to another pendulum. A piece of paper impregnated with an electrochemically sensitive solution resides underneath the electrode and changes color whenever a pulse reaches the electrode. A gear advances the copper plate and paper in tandem with each swing of the pendulum; over time, the result is a perfect reproduction of the copper plate. In Bain's system, it is critical that the pendulums of the transceiver and receiver are in perfect step, or else the reproduced image will be distorted.

In 1847, the English physicist Frederick Bakewell developed the first working fax machine. Bakewell's machine was similar to Bain's but used a revolving drum coated in tinfoil, with non-conductive ink painted on the foil and a stylus that scans across the drum and sends a pulse down a pair of wires when it contacts a conductive point on the foil. The receiver contains an electrode that touches a sheet of chemically treated paper, which changes color when the electrode receives a pulse; the result is a reverse contrast (white-on-blue) reproduction of the original image. Bakewell's fax machine was marginally more successful than Bain's but suffered from the same synchronization issues. In 1862, Giovanni Caselli solved this with the pantelegraph, the first fax machine put into regular service. Largely based on Bain's design, it ensured complete synchronization by flanking the pendulums of both the transceiver and receiver between two magnetic regulators, which become magnetized with each swing of the pendulum and become demagnetized when the pendulum reaches the maxima and minima of each oscillation.

In 1893, the American engineer Elisha Gray introduced the telautograph, the first widely commercially successful fax machine that used linkage bars translating x- and y-axis motion at the receiver to scan a pen across the paper and strike it only when actuated by the stylus moving across the transceiver drum. Because it could use commodity stationery paper, it became popular in business and hospitals. In 1902, the German engineer Arthur Korn introduced the phototelautograph, a fax machine that used a light-sensitive selenium cell to scan a paper to be copied, instead of relying on a metallic drum and stylus. It was even more commercially successful than Gray's machine and became the basis for wirephoto (also known as telephotography) machines used by newspapers around the world from the early 1900s onward.

==== Analog scanners ====
Before the advent of digital image processing in the middle of the 20th century, the term scanner originally referred to analog equipment used within offset printing presses. These analog scanners varied in design depending on their purpose: some scanned images stored as color transparency film onto color separation plates that could be used to print the original image en masse; while others were used to convert simple cyan, magenta, and yellow (CMY) plates into cyan, magenta, yellow, and black (CMYK) in order to produce prints with darker, richer colors—a process known then in the trade as color correction (unrelated to the modern, cinematographic sense). Converting from CMY to CMYK used to be a highly manual affair involving techniques such as masking. Analog scanners automated this process to a large extent.

Alexander Murray and Richard Morse invented and patented the first analog color scanner at Eastman Kodak in 1937. Their machine was of a drum scanner design that imaged a color transparency mounted in the drum, with a light source placed underneath the film, and three photocells with red, green, and blue color filters reading each spot on the transparency to translate the image into three electronic signals. In Murray and Morse's initial design, the drum was connected to three lathes that etched CMY halftone dots onto three offset cylinders directly. The rights to the patent were sold to Printing Developments Incorporated (P.D.I.) in 1946, who improved on the design by using a photomultiplier tube to image the points on the negative, which produced an amplified signal that was then fed to a single-purpose computer that processed the RGB signals into color-corrected CMYK values. The processed signals are then sent to four lathes that etch CMYK halftone dots onto the offset cylinders.

In 1948, Arthur Hardy of the Interchemical Corporation and F. L. Wurzburg of the Massachusetts Institute of Technology invented the first analog, color flatbed image scanner, intended for producing color-corrected lithographic plates from a color negative. In this system, three color-separated plates (of CMY values) are prepared from a color negative via dot etching and placed in the scanner bed. Above each plate are rigidly fixed, equidistant light beam projectors that focus a beam of light onto one corner of the plate. The entire bed with all three plates moves horizontally, back and forth, to reach the opposite corners of the plate; with each horiztonal oscillation of the bed, the bed moves down one step to cover the entire vertical area of the plate. While this is happening, the beam of light focused on a given spot on the plate gets reflected and bounced off to a photocell adjacent to the projector. Each photocell connects to an analog image processor, which evaluates the reflectance of the combined CMY values using Neugebauer equations and outputs a signal to a light projector hovering over a fourth, unexposed lithographic plate. This plate receives a color-corrected, continuous-tone dot-etch of either the cyan, magenta, or yellow values. The fourth plate is replaced with another unexposed plate, and the process repeats until three color-corrected plates, of cyan, magenta and yellow, are produced. In the 1950s, the Radio Corporation of America (RCA) took Hardy and Wurzburg's patent and replaced the projector-and-photocell arrangement with a video camera tube focusing on one spot of the plate.

=== Use in digital imaging ===
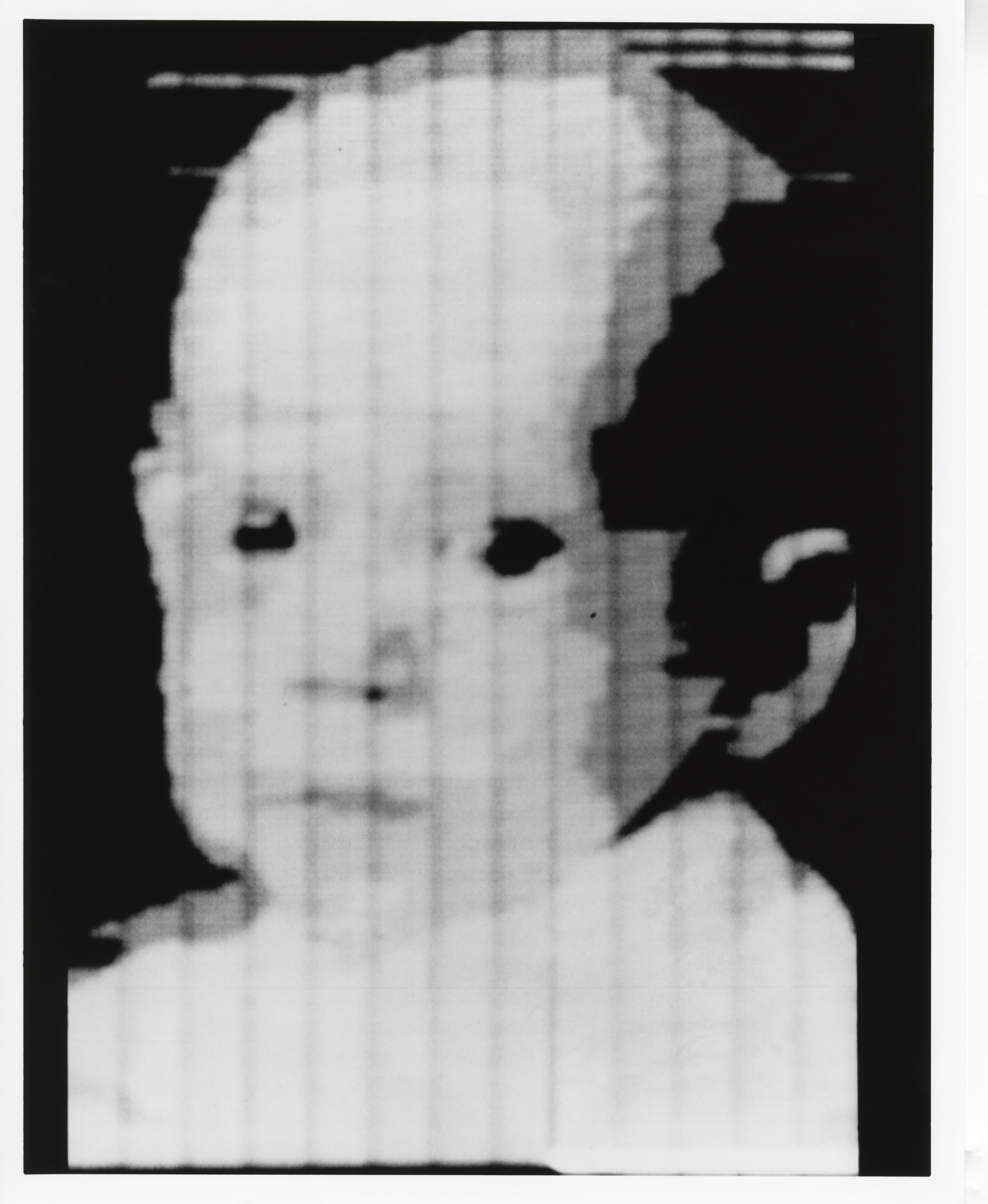
The first image ever scanned to a computer, of Russell A. Kirsch's newborn son, Walden (1957)

The first digital imaging system was the Bartlane system in 1920. Named after the pair who invented it, Harry G. Bartholomew and Maynard D. McFarlane, the Bartlane system used zinc plates etched with an image from a film negative projected at five different exposure levels to correspond to five quantization levels. All five plates are affixed to a long, motor-driven rotating cylinder, with five equidistant contacts scanning over each plate at the same starting position. The Bartlane system was initially used exclusively by telegraph, with the five-bit Baudot code used to transmit the grayscale digital image. In 1921, the system was modified for offline use, with a five-bit paper tape punch punching holes depending on whether its connections to the contacts are bridged or not. The result was a stored digital image with five gray levels. Reproduction of the image was achieved with a lamp passing over the punched holes, exposing five different intensities of light onto a film negative.

The first scanner to store its images digitally onto a computer was a drum scanner built in 1957 at the National Bureau of Standards (NBS, later NIST) by a team led by Russell A. Kirsch. It used a photomultiplier tube to detect light at a given point and produced an amplified signal that a computer could read and store into memory. The computer of choice at the time was the SEAC mainframe; the maximum horizontal resolution that the SEAC was capable of processing was 176 pixels. The first image ever scanned on this machine was a photograph of Kirsch's three-month-old son, Walden.

In 1969, Dacom introduced the 111 fax machine, which was the first digital fax machine to employ data compression using an on-board computer. It employed a flatbed design with a continuous feed capable of scanning up to letter paper in 1-bit monochrome (black and white).

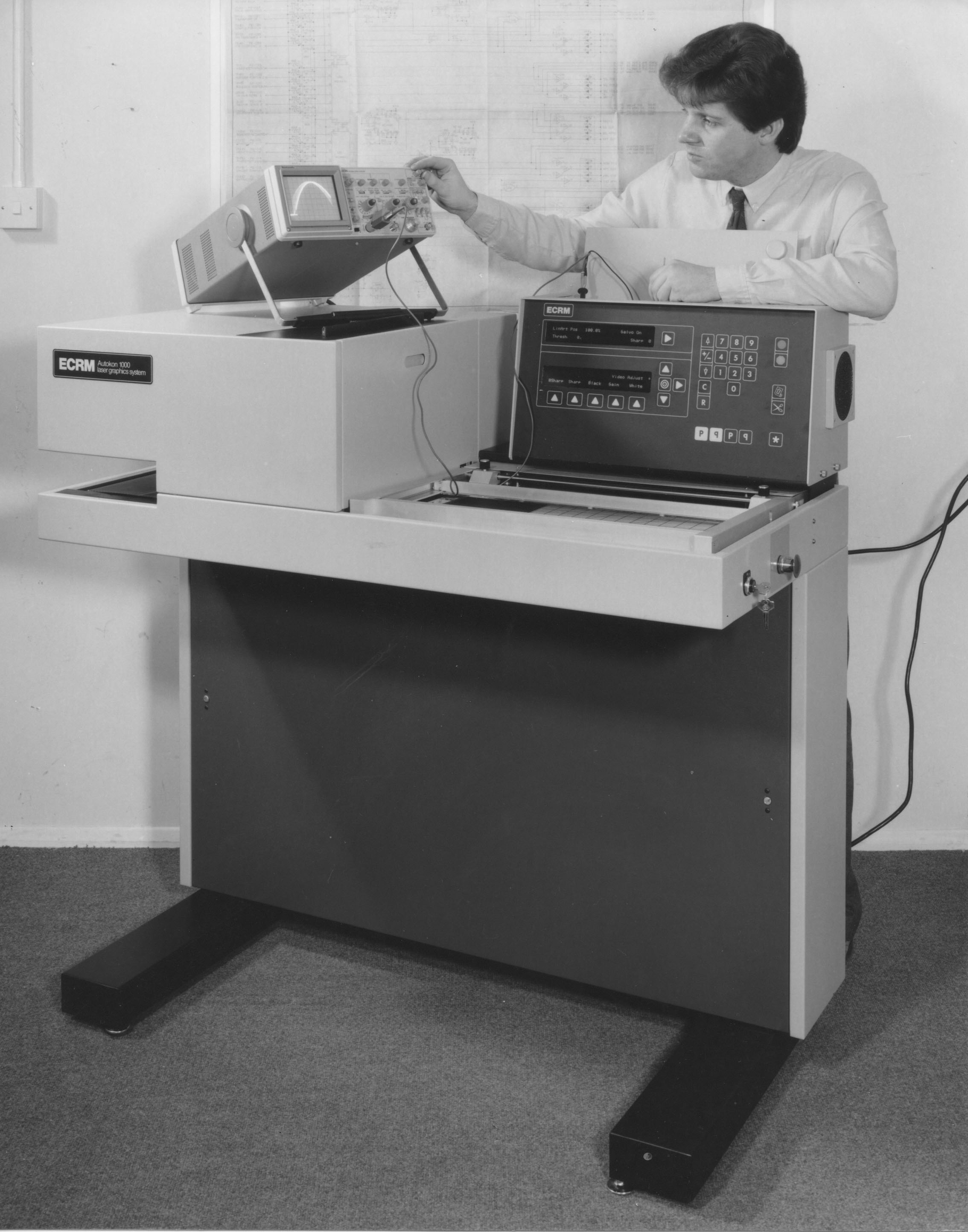
The Autokon series of scanners were the first flatbed scanners on the market designed for digital image processing; pictured is the 1000/DE, a successor model released in 1988.

The first flatbed scanner used for digital image processing was the Autokon line introduced by ECRM Inc. in 1975. The inaugural Autokon 8400 used a laser beam to scan pages up to 11 by 14 inches at a maximum resolution of 1000 lines per inch. Although it was only capable of scanning in 1-bit monochrome, the on-board processor was capable of halftoning, unsharp masking, contrast adjustment, and anamorphic distortions, among other features. The Autokon 8400 could either be connected to a film recorder to create a negative for producing plates or connected to a mainframe or minicomputer for further image processing and digital storage. The Autokon series was expanded over the following two decades and enjoyed widespread use in newspapers and prepress.

In 1977, Raymond Kurzweil, of his start-up company Kurzweil Computer Products, released the Kurzweil Reading Machine, which was the first flatbed scanner with a charge-coupled device (CCD) imaging element. The Kurzweil Reading Machine was invented to assist blind people in reading books that had not been translated to braille. It comprised the image scanner and a Data General Nova minicomputer—the latter performing the image processing, optical character recognition (OCR), and speech synthesis.

The first scanners for personal computers appeared in the mid-1980s, starting with ThunderScan for the Macintosh in December 1984. Designed by Andy Hertzfeld and released by Thunderware Inc., the ThunderScan contains a specialized image sensor built into a plastic housing the same shape as the ink ribbon cartridge of Apple's ImageWriter printer. The ThunderScan slots into the ImageWriter's ribbon carrier and connects to both the ImageWriter and the Macintosh simultaneously. The ImageWriter's carriage, controlled by the ThunderScan, moves left-to-right to scan one 200-dpi (dots per inch) line at a time, with the carriage return serving to advance the scanner down the print to be scanned. The ThunderScan was the Macintosh's first scanner and sold well but operated very slowly and was only capable of scanning prints at 1-bit monochrome. In 1999, Canon iterated on this idea with the IS-22, a cartridge that fit into their inkjet printers to convert them into sheetfed scanners.

In early 1985, Datacopy released the first flatbed scanner for the IBM PC, the Datacopy Model 700. Based on a CCD imaging element, the Model 700 was capable of scanning letter-sized documents at a maximum resolution of 200 dpi at 1-bit monochrome. The Model 700 came with a special interface card for connecting to the PC, and an optional, aftermarket OCR software card and software package were sold for the Model 700. In April 1985, LaserFAX Inc. introduced a CCD-based color flatbed scanner, the SpectraSCAN 200 (later rebranded the SpectraFAX 200), for the IBM PC. The SpectraSCAN 200 worked by placing color filters over the CCD and taking four passes (three for each primary color and one for black) per scan to build up a color reproduction. The SpectraSCAN 200 took between two and three minutes to produce a scan of a letter-sized print at 200-dpi; its grayscale counterpart, the DS-200, took only 30 seconds to make a scan at the same size and resolution. The SpectraSCAN was the first flatbed scanner capable of scanning in color.

The first relatively affordable flatbed scanner for personal computers appeared in February 1987 with Hewlett-Packard's ScanJet, which was capable of scanning 4-bit (64-shade) grayscale images at a maximum resolution of 300 dpi. By the beginning of 1988, the ScanJet had accounted for 27 percent of all scanner sales in terms of dollar volume, per Gartner Dataquest. In February 1989, the company introduced the ScanJet Plus, which increased the bit depth to 8 bits (256 shades) while costing only US$200 more than the original ScanJet's $1990 (equivalent to $5,169 in 2025). This led to a massive price drop in grayscale scanners with equivalent or lesser features in the market. The number of third-party developers producing software and hardware supporting these scanners jumped dramatically in turn, effectively popularizing the scanner for the personal computer user. By 1999, the cost of the average color-capable scanner had dropped to $300 (equivalent to $580 in 2025). That year, Computer Shopper declared 1999 "the year that scanners finally became a mainstream commodity".

== Types ==
=== Flatbed ===
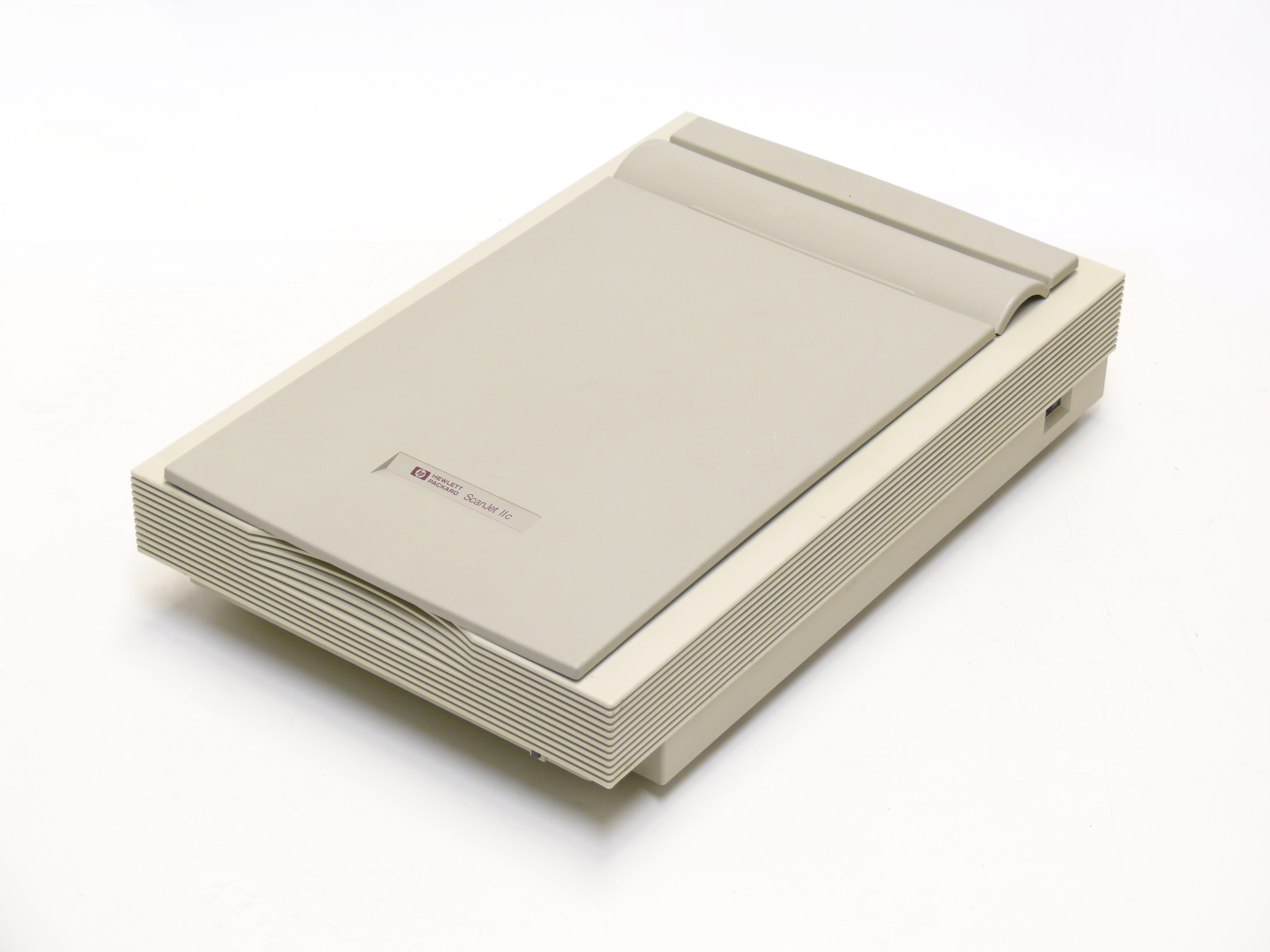
A flatbed scanner (HP ScanJet IIC) with its lid closed

A flatbed scanner is a type of scanner that provides a glass bed (platen) on which the object to be scanned lies motionless. The scanning element moves vertically from under the glass, scanning either the entirety of the platen or a predetermined portion. The driver software for most flatbed scanners allows users to prescan their documents—in essence, to take a quick, low-resolution pass at a document in order to judge what area of the document should be scanned (if not the entirety of it), before scanning it at a higher resolution. Some flatbed scanners incorporate sheet-feeding mechanisms called automatic document feeders (ADFs) that use the same scanning element as the flatbed portion.

This type of scanner is sometimes called a reflective scanner, because it works by shining white light onto the object to be scanned and reading the intensity and color of light that is reflected from it, usually a line at a time. They are designed for scanning prints or other flat, opaque materials; can be used as a sort of lensless camera to directly digitize flat objects like leaves. Some models of flatbed scanners have available transparency adapters or incorporate a transparency unit for converting film originals to digital files, which—for a number of reasons—in most cases, are not very well suited to scanning film. But a minority of those small number of models that resolved most of the issues and can produce similar results to film scanners, called "photo flatbed" scanners, have the distinct advantage in allowing more versatility over the film format that can be scanned. Also, switching between reflective and transparency scanning can be done in software.

=== Sheetfed ===
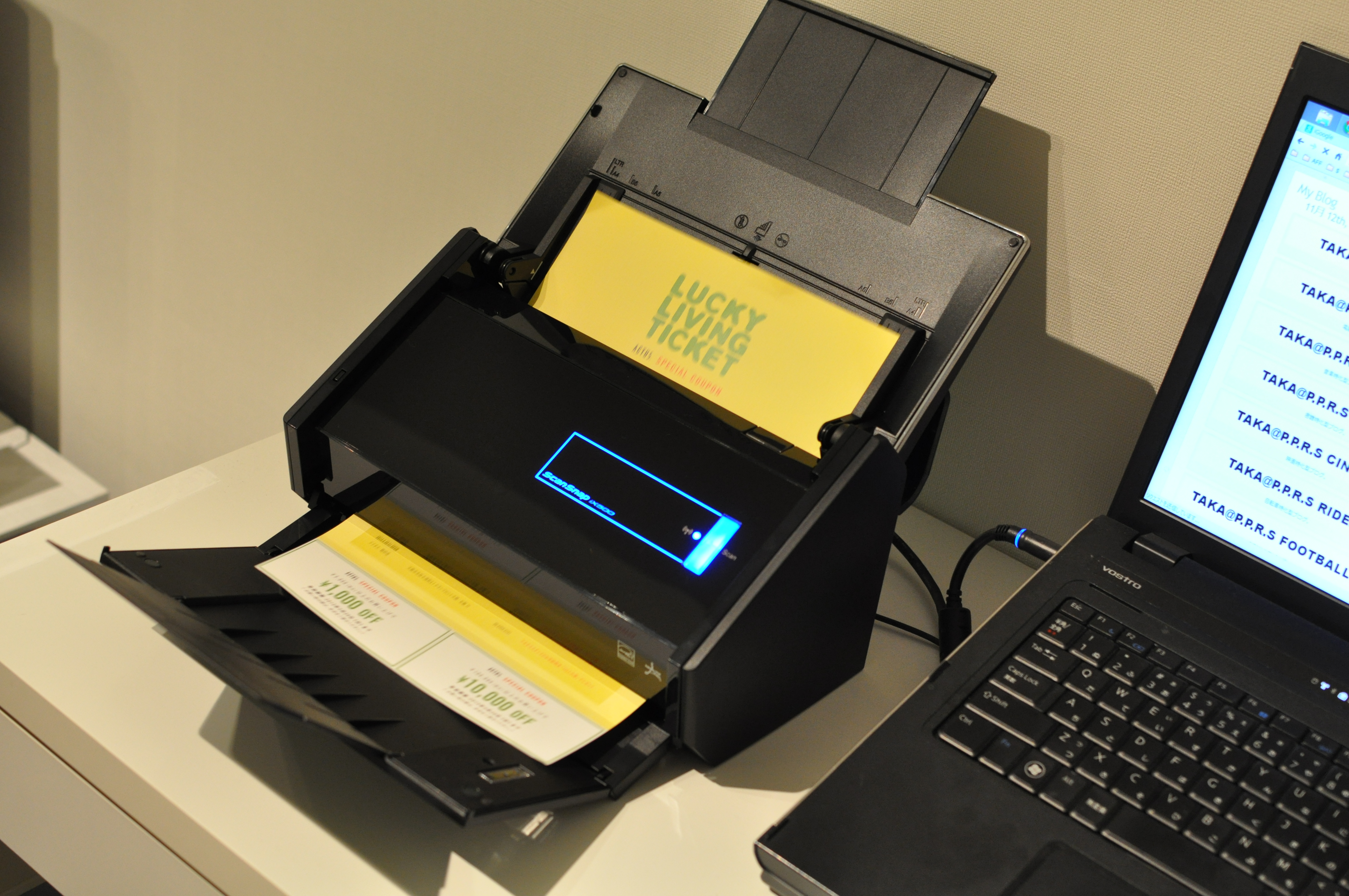
An automatic document feeder (Fujitsu ScanSnap iX500)

A sheetfed scanner, also known as a document feeder, is a type of scanner that uses motor-driven rollers to move one single sheet of paper at a time past a stationary scanning element (two scanning elements, in the case of scanners with duplex functionality). Unlike flatbed scanners, sheetfed scanners are not equipped to scan bound material such as books or magazines, nor are they suitable for any material thicker than plain printer paper. Some sheetfed scanners, called automatic document feeders (ADFs), are capable of scanning several sheets in one session, although others only accept one page at a time. Some sheetfed scanners are portable, powered by batteries, and have their own storage, eventually transferring stored scans to a computer.

=== Handheld ===
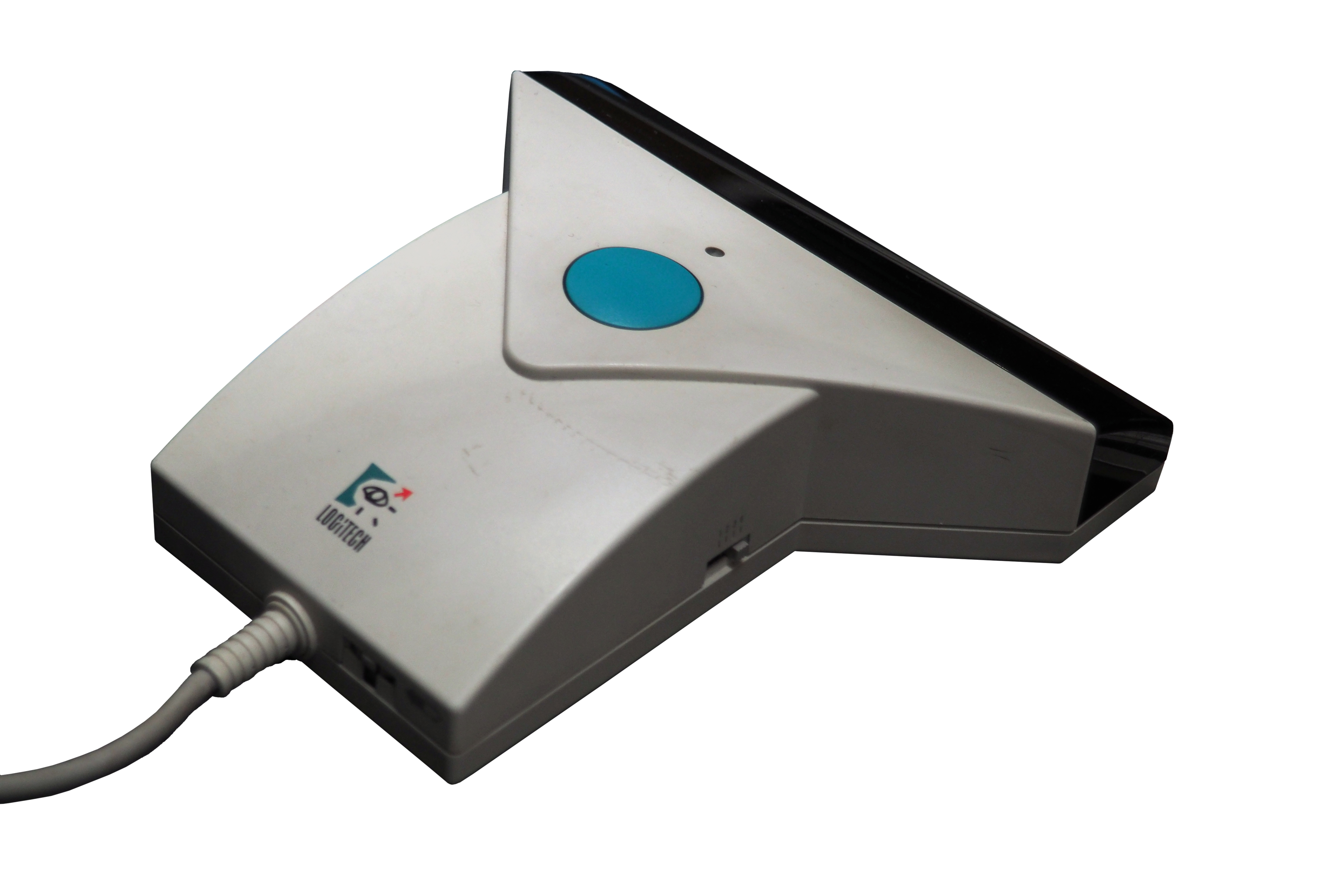
A handheld scanner (Logitech ScanMan Color)

A handheld scanner is a type of scanner that must be manually dragged or gilded by hand across the surface of the object to be scanned. Scanning documents in this manner requires a steady hand, as an uneven scanning rate produces distorted images. Some handheld scanners have an indicator light on the scanner for this purpose, actuating if the user is moving the scanner too fast. They typically have at least one button that starts the scan when pressed; it is held by the user for the duration of the scan. Some other handheld scanners have switches to set the optical resolution, as well as a roller, which generates a clock pulse for synchronization with the computer. Older hand scanners were monochrome, and produced light from an array of green LEDs to illuminate the image; later ones scan in monochrome or color, as desired. A hand scanner may also have a small window through which the document being scanned could be viewed. As hand scanners are much narrower than most normal document or book sizes, software (or the end user) needed to combine several narrow "strips" of scanned documents to produce the finished article.

Inexpensive, portable, battery-powered or USB-powered wand scanners and pen scanners, typically capable of scanning an area as wide as a normal letter and much longer, remain available as of 2024. Some computer mice can also scan documents.

=== Drum ===
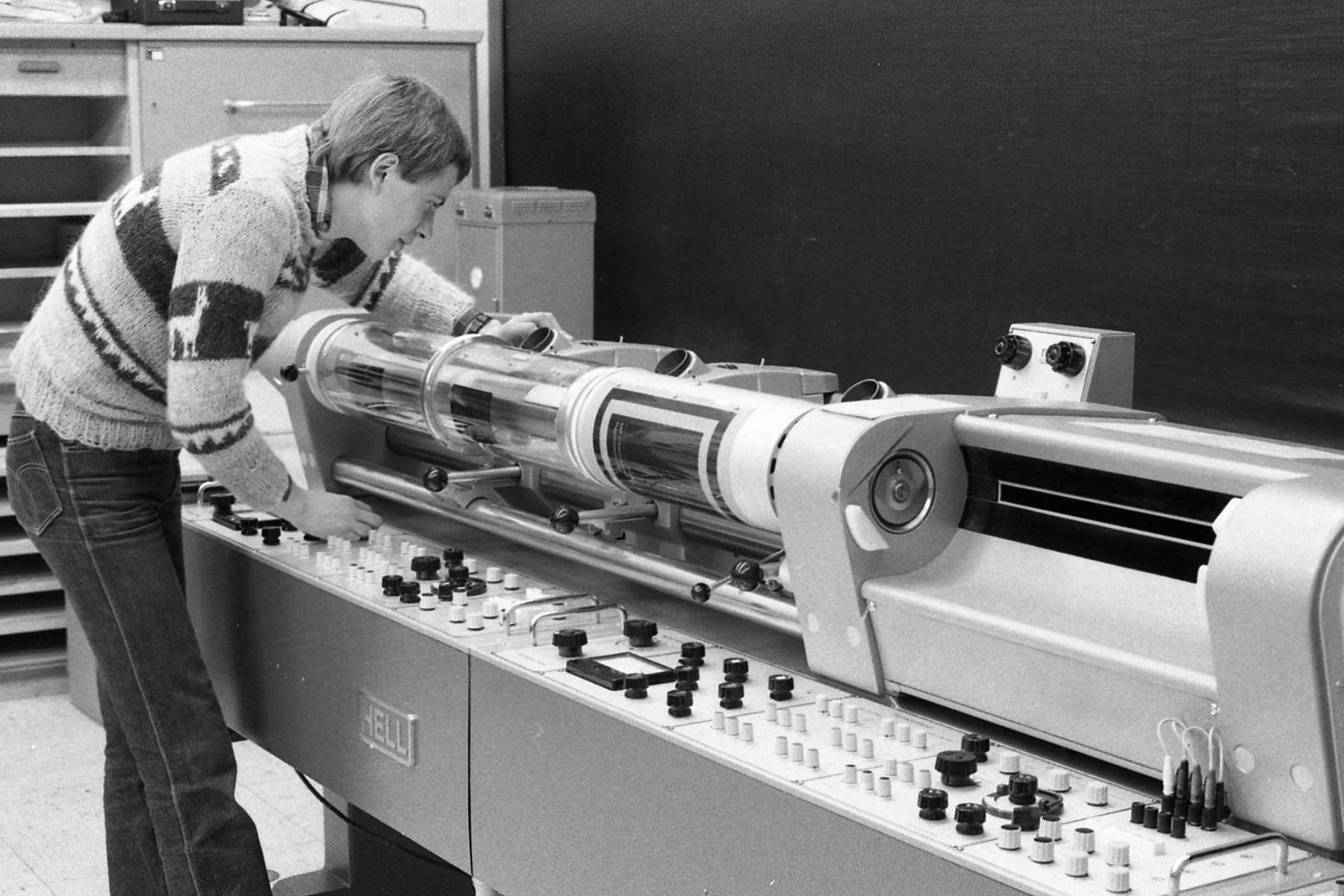
A drum scanner (Hell Chromagraph DC 300) being operated

A drum scanner is a type of scanner that uses a clear, motor-driven rotating cylinder (drum) onto which a print, a film negative, a transparency, or any other flat object is taped or otherwise secured. A beam of light either projects past, or reflects off, the material to be scanned onto a series of mirrors, which focus the beam onto the drum scanner's photomultiplier tube (PMT). After one revolution, the beam of light moves down a single step. When scanning transparent media, such as negatives, a light beam is directed from within the cylinder onto the media; when scanning opaque items, a light beam from above is reflected off the surface of the media. When only one PMT is present, three passes of the image are required for a full-color RGB scan. When three PMTs are present, only a single pass is required.

The photomultiplier tubes of drum scanners offer superior dynamic range to that of CCD sensors. For this reason, drum scanners can extract more detail from very dark shadow areas of a transparency than flatbed scanners using CCD sensors. The smaller dynamic range of the CCD sensors (versus photomultiplier tubes) can lead to loss of shadow detail, especially when scanning very dense transparency film. Drum scanners are also able to resolve true detail in excess of 10000 dpi, producing higher-resolution scans than any CCD scanner.

=== Overhead ===
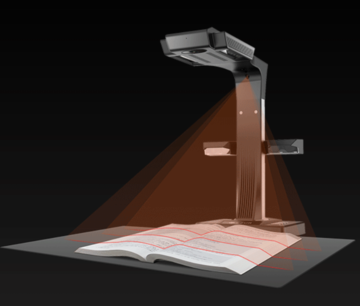
An overhead book scanner (CZUR ET Series) with lasers for calibration

An overhead scanner is a type of scanner that places the scanning element in a housing on top of a vertical post, hovering above the document or object to be scanned, which lies stationary on an open-air bed. Chinon Industries patented a specific type of overhead scanner, which uses a rotating mirror to reflect the contents of the bed onto a linear CCD, in 1987. Although very flexible—allowing users to scan not only two-dimensional prints and documents but any 3D object, of any size—the Chinon design required the user to provide uniform illumination of the object to be scanned and was more cumbersome to set up.

A more modern type of overhead scanner is a document camera (also known as a video scanner), which uses a digital camera to capture a document all at once. Most document cameras output live video of the document and are usually reserved for displaying documents to a live audience, but they may also be used as replacements for image scanners, capturing a single frame of the output as an image file. Document cameras may even use the same APIs as scanners when connected to computers. A planetary scanner is a type of very-high-resolution document camera used for capturing certain fragile documents. A book scanner is another kind of document camera, pairing a digital camera with a scanning area defined by a mat to assist in scanning books. Some more advanced models of book scanners project a laser onto the page for calibration and software skew correction.

=== Film ===
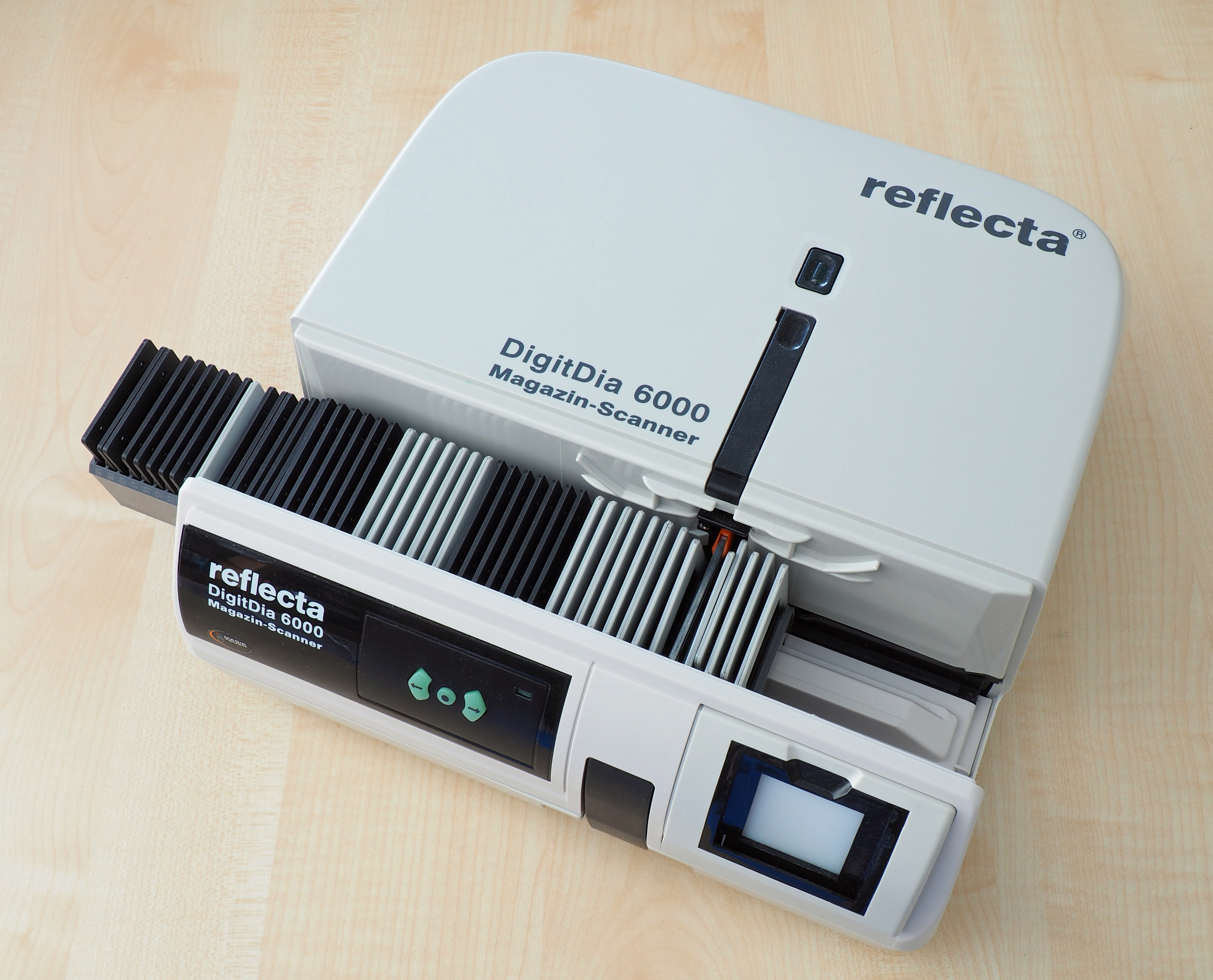
A film scanner (Reflecta DigitDia 6000) designed for scanning slides

A film scanner, also known as a slide scanner or a transparency scanner, is a type of specialized flatbed scanner specifically for scanning film negatives and slides. A typical film scanner works by passing a narrowly focused beam of light through the film and reading the intensity and color of the light that emerges. The lowest-cost dedicated film scanners can be had for less than $50, and they might be sufficient for modest needs. From there they inch up in staggered levels of quality and advanced features upward of five figures.

=== Portable ===
An illustration of a portable business card scanner

Image scanners are usually used in conjunction with a computer which controls the scanner and stores scans. Small portable scanners, either sheetfed or handheld and operated by batteries and with storage capability, are available for use away from a computer; stored scans can be transferred later. Many can scan both small documents such as business cards and till receipts, as well as letter-sized documents.

=== Software scanners ===
The higher-resolution cameras fitted to some smartphones can produce reasonable quality document scans by taking a photograph with the phone's camera and post-processing it with a scanning app, a range of which are available for most phone operating systems, to whiten the background of a page, correct perspective distortion so that the shape of a rectangular document is corrected, convert to black-and-white, etc. Many such apps can scan multiple-page documents with successive camera exposures and output them either as a single file or multiple-page files. Some smartphone scanning apps can save documents directly to online storage locations, such as Dropbox and Evernote, send via email, or fax documents via email-to-fax gateways.

Smartphone scanner apps can be broadly divided into three categories:

1. Document scanning apps primarily designed to handle documents and output PDF, and sometimes JPEG, files
2. Photo scanning apps that output JPEG files, and have editing functions useful for photo rather than document editing;
3. Barcode-like QR code scanning apps that then search the internet for information associated with the code.

== Scanning elements ==
=== Charge-coupled device (CCD) ===
Scanners equipped with charge-coupled device (CCD) scanning elements require a sophisticated series of mirrors and lenses to reproduce an image, but the result of this complexity is a much higher-quality scan. Because CCDs have a much greater depth of field, they are more forgiving when it comes to scanning documents that are difficult to get perfectly flat against the platen (such as bound books).

=== Contact image sensor (CIS) ===
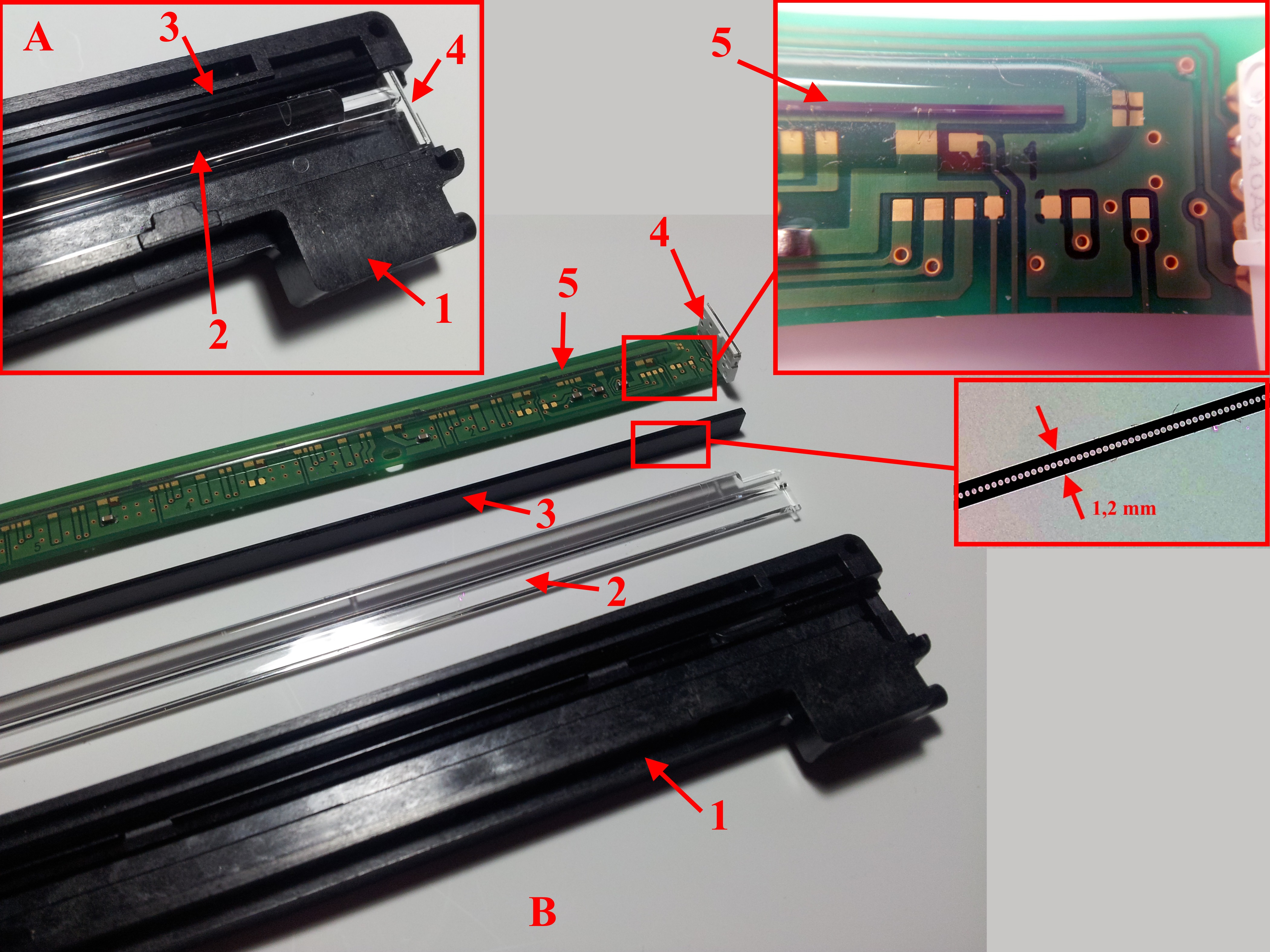
Scanner unit with CIS. A: assembled, B: disassembled; 1: housing, 2: light conductor, 3: lenses, 4: chip with two RGB-LEDs, 5: CIS

Scanners equipped with contact image sensor (CIS) scanning elements are designed to be in near-direct contact with the document to be scanned and thus do not require the complex optics of CCDs scanners. However, their depth of field is much worse, resulting in blurry scans if the scanned document is not perfectly flush against the platten. Because the sensors require far less power than CCD scanners, CIS scanners are able to be manufactured down to a low cost and are typically much lighter in weight and depth than CCD scanners.

=== Photomultiplier tube (PMT) ===
Scanners equipped with photomultiplier tubes (PMT) are nearly exclusively drum scanners.

== Scan quality ==
Color scanners typically read RGB (red-green-blue) color data from the array. This data is then processed with some proprietary algorithm to correct for different exposure conditions, and sent to the computer via the device's input/output interface (usually USB, previous to which was SCSI or bidirectional parallel port in older units).

Color depth varies depending on the scanning array characteristics, but is usually at least 24 bits. High-quality models have 36-48 bits of color depth.

Another qualifying parameter for a scanner is its resolution, measured in pixels per inch (ppi), sometimes more accurately referred to as samples per inch (spi). Instead of using the scanner's true optical resolution, the only meaningful parameter, manufacturers like to refer to the interpolated resolution, which is much higher thanks to software interpolation. As of 2009, a high-end flatbed scanner can scan up to 5400 ppi and drum scanners have an optical resolution of between 3000 and 24000 ppi.

Effective resolution refers to the true resolution of a scanner, and is determined by using a resolution test chart. The effective resolution of most all consumer flatbed scanners is considerably lower than the manufactures' given optical resolution.

Manufacturers often claim interpolated resolutions as high as 19200 ppi; but such numbers carry little meaningful value because the number of possible interpolated pixels is unlimited, and doing so does not increase the level of captured detail.

The size of the file created increases with the square of the resolution; doubling the resolution quadruples the file size. A resolution must be chosen that is within the capabilities of the equipment, preserves sufficient detail, and does not produce a file of excessive size. The file size can be reduced for a given resolution by using "lossy" compression methods such as JPEG, at some cost in quality. If the best possible quality is required lossless compression should be used; reduced-quality files of smaller size can be produced from such an image when required (e.g., image designed to be printed on a full page, and a much smaller file to be displayed as part of a fast-loading web page).

Purity can be diminished by scanner noise, optical flare, poor analog to digital conversion, scratches, dust, Newton's rings, out-of-focus sensors, improper scanner operation, and poor software. Drum scanners are said to produce the purest digital representations of the film, followed by high-end film scanners that use the larger Kodak Tri-Linear sensors.

The third important parameter for a scanner is its dynamic range (also known as density range). A high-density range means that the scanner is able to record shadow details and brightness details in one scan. Density of film is measured on a base 10 log scale and varies between 0.0 (transparent) and 5.0, about 16 stops. Density range is the space taken up in the 0 to 5 scale, and Dmin and Dmax denote where the least dense and most dense measurements on a negative or positive film. The density range of negative film is up to 3.6d, while slide film dynamic range is 2.4d. Color negative density range after processing is 2.0d thanks to the compression of the 12 stops into a small density range. Dmax will be the densest on slide film for shadows, and densest on negative film for highlights. Some slide films can have a Dmax close to 4.0d with proper exposure, and so can black-and-white negative film.

Consumer-level flatbed photo scanners have a dynamic range in the 2.0–3.0 range, which can be inadequate for scanning all types of photographic film, as Dmax can be and often is between 3.0d and 4.0d with traditional black-and-white film. Color film compresses its 12 stops of a possible 16 stops (film latitude) into just 2.0d of space via the process of dye coupling and removal of all silver from the emulsion. Kodak Vision 3 has 18 stops. So, color-negative film scans the easiest of all film types on the widest range of scanners. Because traditional black-and-white film retains the image creating silver after processing, density range can be almost twice that of color film. This makes scanning traditional black-and-white film more difficult and requires a scanner with at least a 3.6d dynamic range, but also a Dmax between 4.0d to 5.0d. High-end (photo lab) flatbed scanners can reach a dynamic range of 3.7, and Dmax around 4.0d. Dedicated film scanners have a dynamic range between 3.0d–4.0d. Office document scanners can have a dynamic range of less than 2.0d. Drum scanners have a dynamic range of 3.6–4.5.

For scanning film, infrared cleaning is a technique used to remove the effects of dust and scratches on images scanned from film; many modern scanners incorporate this feature. It works by scanning the film with infrared light; the dyes in typical color film emulsions are transparent to infrared light, but dust and scratches are not, and block infrared; scanner software can use the visible and infrared information to detect scratches and process the image to greatly reduce their visibility, considering their position, size, shape, and surroundings. Scanner manufacturers usually have their own names attached to this technique. For example, Epson, Minolta, Nikon, Konica Minolta, Microtek, and others use Digital ICE, while Canon uses its own system, FARE (Film Automatic Retouching and Enhancement). Plustek uses LaserSoft Imaging iSRD. Some independent software developers design infrared cleaning tools.

By combining full-color imagery with 3D models, modern hand-held scanners are able to completely reproduce objects electronically. The addition of 3D color printers enables accurate miniaturization of these objects, with applications across many industries and professions.

For scanner apps, the scan quality is highly dependent on the quality of the phone camera and on the framing chosen by the user of the app.

== Connectivity ==
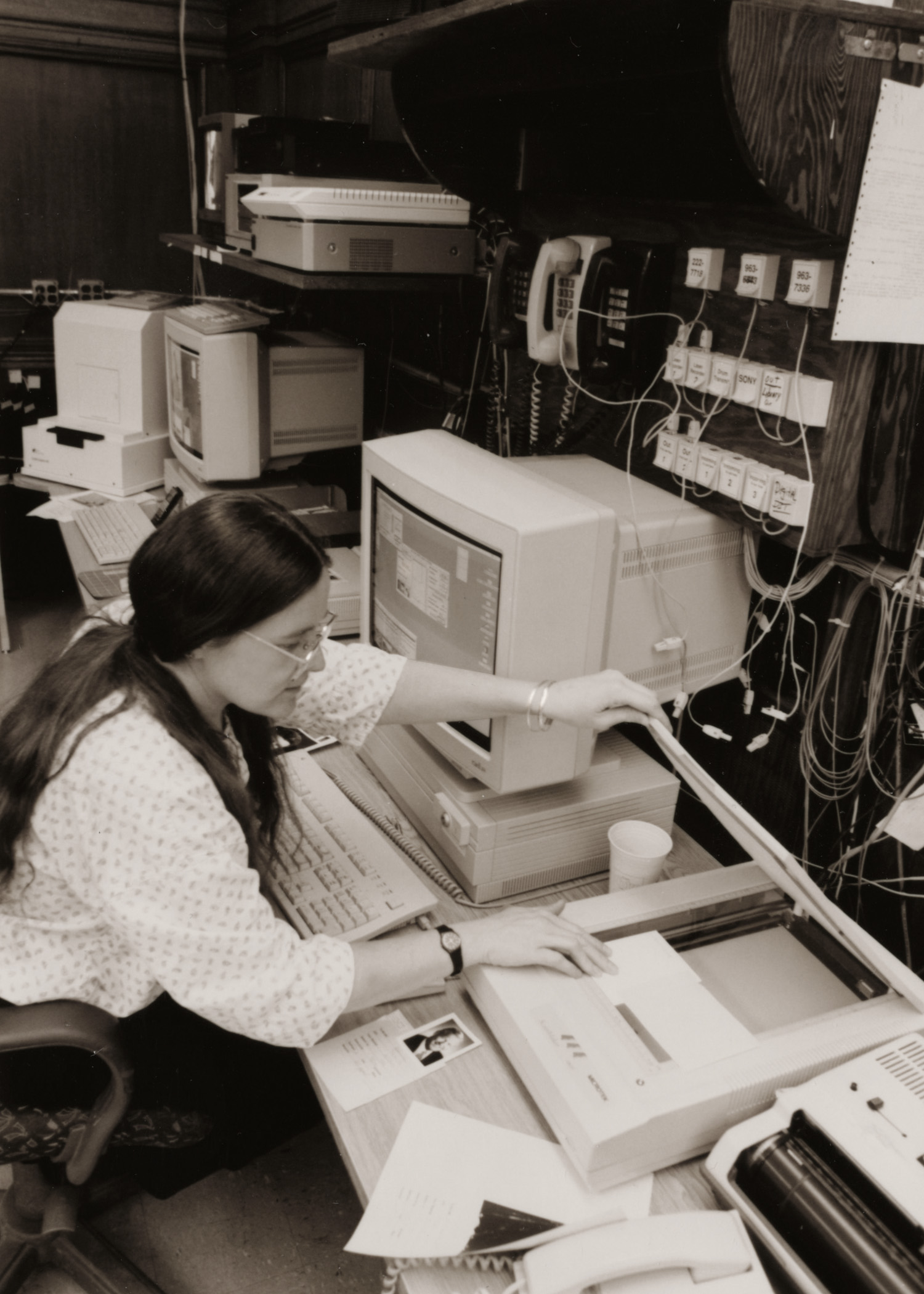
A photographic print being scanned into a computer at the photo desk of the Detroit News in the early 1990s

Scans must virtually always be transferred from the scanner to a computer or information storage system for further processing or storage. There are two basic issues: (1) how the scanner is physically connected to the computer and (2) how the application retrieves the information from the scanner.

=== Direct connection ===
The file size of a scan can go up to about 100 MB for a 600 dpi, 23 × 28 cm (slightly larger than A4 paper) uncompressed 24-bit image. Scanned files must be transferred and stored. Scanners can generate this volume of data in a matter of seconds, making a fast connection desirable.

Scanners communicate to their host computer using one of the following physical interfaces, listing roughly from slow to fast:

- Parallel port – Connecting through a parallel port is the slowest common transfer method. Early scanners had parallel port connections that could not transfer data faster than 70 kilobytes/second. The primary advantage of the parallel port connection was economic and user skill level: it avoided adding an interface card to the computer.
- GPIB – General Purpose Interface Bus. Certain drum scanners like the Howtek D4000 featured both a SCSI and GPIB interface. The latter conforms to the IEEE-488 standard, introduced in the mid-1970s. The GPIB interface has only been used by a few scanner manufacturers, mostly serving the DOS/Windows environment. For Apple Macintosh systems, National Instruments provided a NuBus GPIB interface card.
- Small Computer System Interface (SCSI) – SCSI is rarely used since the early 21st century, supported only by computers with a SCSI interface, either on a card or built-in. During the evolution of the SCSI standard, speeds increased. Widely available and easily set up USB and Firewire largely supplanted SCSI.
- Universal Serial Bus (USB) – USB scanners can transfer data quickly. The early USB 1.1 standard could transfer data at 1.5 megabytes per second (slower than SCSI), but the later USB 2.0/3.0 standards can transfer at more than 20/60 megabytes per second in practice.
- FireWire – Also known as IEEE-1394, FireWire is an interface of comparable speed to USB 2.0. Possible FireWire speeds are 25, 50, and 100, 400, and 800 megabits per second, but devices may not support all speeds.
- Proprietary interfaces – Bespoke interfaces were used on some early scanners that used a proprietary interface card rather than a standard interface.

=== Indirect connection ===
During the early 1990s professional flatbed scanners were available over a local computer network. This proved useful to publishers, print shops, etc. This functionality largely fell out of use as the cost of flatbed scanners reduced enough to make sharing unnecessary.

From 2000 all-in-one multi-purpose devices became available which were suitable for both small offices and consumers, with printing, scanning, copying, and fax capability in a single apparatus that can be made available to all members of a workgroup.

Battery-powered portable scanners store scans on internal memory; they can later be transferred to a computer either by direct connection, typically USB, or in some cases a memory card may be removed from the scanner and plugged into the computer.

=== Applications programming interface ===
A raster image editor must be able to communicate with a scanner. There are many different scanners, and many of those scanners use different protocols. In order to simplify applications programming, some application programming interfaces (APIs) were developed. The API presents a uniform interface to the scanner. This means that the application does not need to know the specific details of the scanner in order to access it directly. For example, Adobe Photoshop supports the TWAIN standard; therefore in theory Photoshop can acquire an image from any scanner that has a TWAIN driver.

In practice, there are often problems with an application communicating with a scanner. Either the application or the scanner manufacturer (or both) may have faults in their implementation of the API.

Typically, the API is implemented as a dynamically linked library. Each scanner manufacturer provides software that translates the API procedure calls into primitive commands that are issued to a hardware controller (such as the SCSI, USB, or FireWire controller). The manufacturer's part of the API is commonly called a device driver, but that designation is not strictly accurate: the API does not run in kernel mode and does not directly access the device. Rather the scanner API library translates application requests into hardware requests.

Common scanner software API include:

- TWAIN – An API used by most scanners. Originally used for low-end and home-use equipment, it is now widely used for large-volume scanning.
- SANE (Scanner Access Now Easy) – A free/open-source API for accessing scanners. Originally developed for Unix and Linux operating systems, it has been ported to OS/2, Mac OS X, and Microsoft Windows. Unlike TWAIN, SANE does not handle the user interface. This allows batch scans and transparent network access without any special support from the device driver.
- Windows Image Acquisition (WIA) – An API provided by Microsoft for use on Microsoft Windows.
- ImageCaptureCore - A Cocoa API used by Apple devices, replacing the Carbon-based ImageCapture Services.
- Image and Scanner Interface Specification (ISIS) – Created by Pixel Translations, which still uses SCSI-2 for performance reasons, ISIS is used by large, departmental-scale, machines.

=== Bundled applications ===
Although no software beyond a scanning utility is a feature of any scanner, many scanners come bundled with software. Typically, in addition to the scanning utility, some type of raster image editor (such as Photoshop or GIMP) and optical character recognition (OCR) software are supplied. OCR software converts graphical images of text into standard text that can be edited using common word-processing and text-editing software; accuracy is rarely perfect.

== Output data ==
Some scanners, especially those designed for scanning printed documents, only work in black and white, but most modern scanners work in color. For the latter, the scanned result is a non-compressed RGB image, which can be transferred to a computer's memory. The color output of different scanners is not the same due to the spectral response of their sensing elements, the nature of their light source, and the correction applied by the scanning software. While most image sensors have a linear response, the output values are usually gamma-compressed. Some scanners compress and clean up the image using embedded firmware. Once on the computer, the image can be processed with a raster graphics editor (such as Photoshop) and saved on a storage device (such as a hard disk).

Scans may be stored uncompressed in image file formats such as BMP; stored losslessly compressed in file formats such as TIFF and PNG; stored lossy-compressed in file formats such as JPEG; or stored as embedded images or converted to vector graphics within a PDF. Optical character recognition (OCR) software allows a scanned image of text to be converted into editable text with reasonable accuracy, so long as the text is cleanly printed and in a typeface and size that can be read by the software. OCR capability may be integrated into the scanning software, or the scanned image file can be processed with a separate OCR program.

== Specific uses ==
=== Document processing ===
Document processing requirements differ from those of image scanning. These requirements include scanning speed, automated paper feed, and the ability to automatically scan both the front and the back of a document. On the other hand, image scanning typically requires the ability to handle fragile and or three-dimensional objects as well as scan at a much higher resolution.

Document scanners have document feeders, usually larger than those sometimes found on copiers or all-purpose scanners. Scans are made at high speed, from 20 up to 420 pages per minute, often in grayscale, although many scanners support color. Many scanners can scan both sides of double-sided originals (duplex operation). Sophisticated document scanners have firmware or software that cleans up scans of text as they are produced, eliminating accidental marks and sharpening type; this would be unacceptable for photographic work, where marks cannot reliably be distinguished from desired fine detail. Files created are compressed as they are made.

The resolution used is usually from 150 to 300 dpi, although the hardware may be capable of 600 or higher resolution; this produces images of text good enough to read and for OCR, without the higher demands on storage space required by higher-resolution images.

Document scans are often processed using OCR technology to create editable and searchable files. Most scanners use ISIS or TWAIN device drivers to scan documents into TIFF format so that the scanned pages can be fed into a document management system that will handle the archiving and retrieval of the scanned pages. Lossy JPEG compression, which is very efficient for pictures, is undesirable for text documents, as slanted straight edges take on a jagged appearance, and solid black (or other color) text on a light background compresses well with lossless compression formats.

While paper feeding and scanning can be done automatically and quickly, preparation and indexing are necessary and require much work by humans. Preparation involves manually inspecting the papers to be scanned and making sure that they are in order, unfolded, without staples or anything else that might jam the scanner. Additionally, some industries such as legal and medical may require documents to have Bates Numbering or some other mark giving a document identification number and date/time of the document scan.

Indexing involves associating relevant keywords to files so that they can be retrieved by content. This process can sometimes be automated to some extent, but it often requires manual labour performed by data-entry clerks. One common practice is the use of barcode-recognition technology: during preparation, barcode sheets with folder names or index information are inserted into the document files, folders, and document groups. Using automatic batch scanning, the documents are saved into appropriate folders, and an index is created for integration into document management systems.

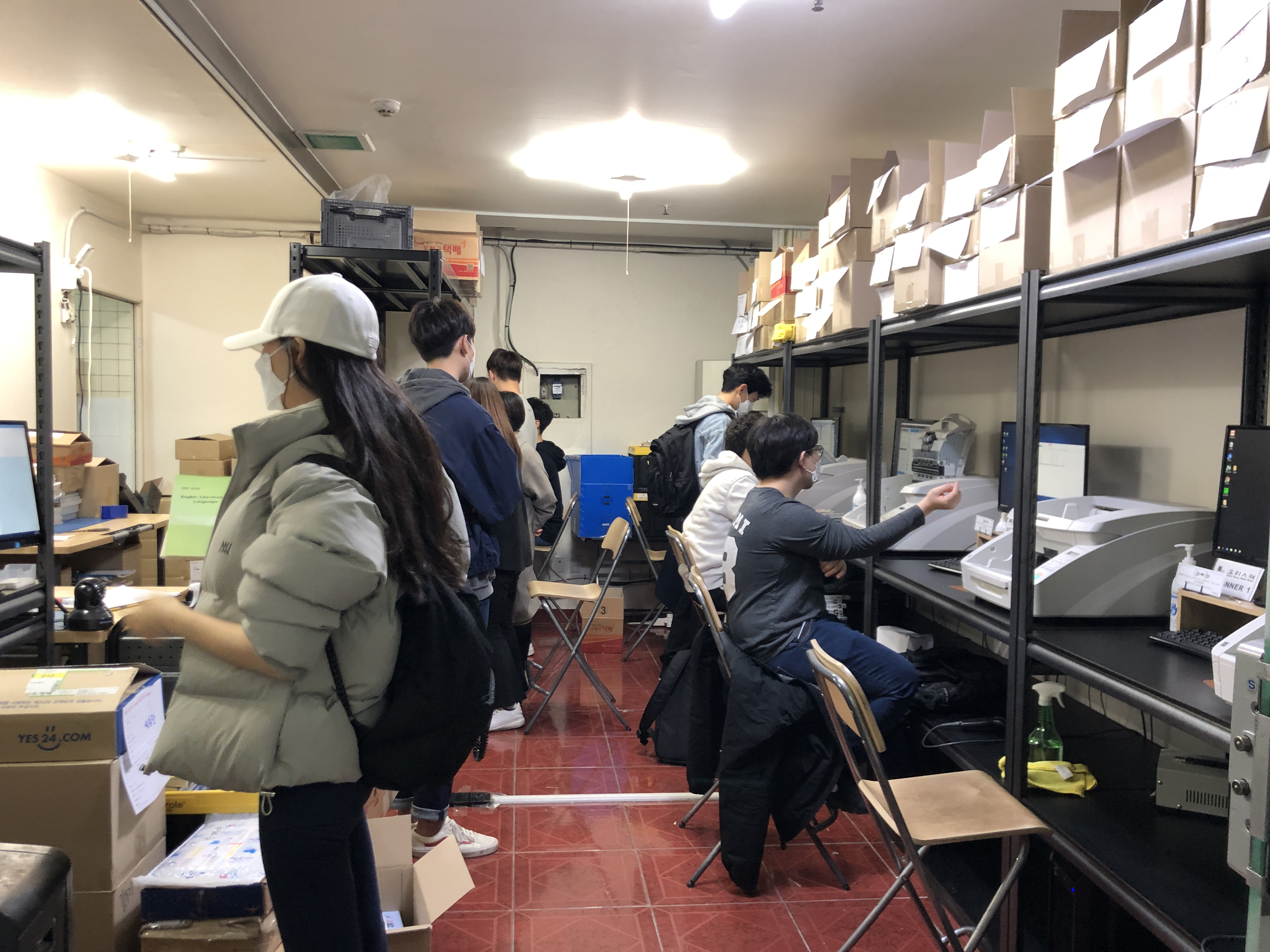
Ministry of Culture, Sports and Tourism of South Korea issued an interpretation in June 2011 that it is a violation of copyright to scan a book by a third party who is not a copyright holder or a book owner. Therefore, in South Korea, book owners visit a "scan room" to scan books by themselves.

A specialized form of document scanning is book scanning. Technical difficulties arise from the books usually being bound and sometimes fragile and irreplaceable, but some manufacturers have developed specialized machinery to deal with this. Often special robotic mechanisms are used to automate the page-turning and scanning process.

=== Other uses ===
Flatbed scanners have been used as digital backs for large-format cameras to create high-resolution digital images of static subjects. A modified flatbed scanner has been used for documentation and quantification of thin layer chromatograms detected by fluorescence quenching on silica gel layers containing an ultraviolet (UV) indicator. The ChromImage is allegedly the first commercial flatbed scanner densitometer. It enables acquisition of TLC plate images and quantification of chromatograms by use of Galaxie-TLC software. Other than being turned into densitometers, flatbed scanners were also turned into colorimeters using different methods. Trichromatic Color Analyser is allegedly the first distributable system using a flatbed scanner as a tristimulus colorimetric device.

Flatbed scanners may also be used to create artwork directly, in a practice known as scanography.

In the biomedical research field, detection devices for DNA microarrays are also referred to as scanners. These scanners are high-resolution systems (up to 1 μm/pixel), similar to microscopes. Detection is performed using CCDs or photomultiplier tubes.

In pathology, scanners are used to capture glass slides with tissue from biopsies and other kinds of sampling, allowing for various methods of digital pathology such as telepathology and the application of artificial intelligence for interpretation.

== See also ==
- 3D scanner
- Barcode reader
- Display resolution
- Photocopier
- Telecine
