= Comparison of optical character recognition software =

This comparison of optical character recognition software includes:

- OCR engines, that do the actual character identification
- Layout analysis software, that divide scanned documents into zones suitable for OCR
- Graphical interfaces to one or more OCR engines
- Software development kits that are used to add OCR capabilities to other software (e.g. forms processing applications, document imaging management systems, e-discovery systems, records management solutions)

Name	Founded year	Latest stable version	Latest release year	License	Online	Windows	Mac OS X	Linux	BSD	Android	iOS	Programming language	SDK?	Languages	Fonts	Output formats	Notes
ABBYY FineReader	1989	16	2023	Proprietary	Yes	Yes	Yes	No	Yes	Yes	Yes	C/C++	Yes	198	All fonts	DOC, DOCX, XLS, XLSX, PPTX, RTF, PDF, HTML, CSV, TXT, ODT, DjVu, EPUB, FB2	ABBYY also supplies SDKs for embedded and mobile devices. Professional, Corporate and Site License Editions for Windows, Express Edition for Mac.
AIDA	2016	13.0	2024	Proprietary	Yes	Yes	Yes	Yes	Yes	Yes	Yes		No	All languages using Latin alphabet	Machine and handprinted text, Latin alphabet	DOCX, XLSX, PPTX, TXT, CSV, PDF, JSON, XML	AIDA is able to learn how to extract any value from any document, with a single click on a single document.
AnyDoc Software	1989	?	?	Proprietary	No	Yes	No	No	No	?	?	VBScript	?	?	?		Works with structured, semi-structured, and unstructured documents.
Asprise OCR SDK	1998	15	2015	Proprietary	Yes	Yes	Yes	Yes	Yes	?	?	Java, C#, VB.NET, C/C++/Delphi	Yes	20+	?	Plain text, searchable PDF, XML	Java, C#, VB.NET, C/C++/Delphi SDKs for OCR and Barcode recognition on Windows, Linux, Mac OS X and Unix.
CuneiForm	1996	1.1	2011	BSD variant	No	Yes	Yes	Yes	Yes	?	?	C/C++	Yes	28	Any printed font	HTML, hOCR, native, RTF, TeX, TXT	Enterprise-class system, can save text formatting and recognizes complicated tables of any structure
E-aksharayan	2010					Yes	No	Yes	No	?	?			14		RTF, TXT, BRL	
GOCR	2000	0.52	2018	GPL	Yes	Yes	Yes	Yes	Yes	?	?	C	?	20+	?		
Google Drive OCR or Google Cloud Vision			2015	Proprietary	Yes	Browser	Browser	Browser	Unknown	?	?	Unknown	Yes	200+	All fonts	text	Google blog post
Microsoft Office Document Imaging	?	Office 2007	2007	Proprietary	No	Yes	No	No	No	?	?	?	?	?	?		Uses OmniPage
Microsoft Office OneNote 2007	2011	?	2007	Proprietary	No	Yes	No	No	No	?	?	?	?	?	?		
OCRFeeder	2009-03	0.8.5	2022	GPL	No	No	No	Yes	No	?	?	Python	?	?	?		Features a full user interface and has a command-line tool for automatic operations. Has its own segmentation algorithm but uses system-wide OCR engines like Tesseract or Ocrad
Ocrad	?	0.29	2024	GPL	Yes	No	Yes	Yes	Yes	?	?	C++	Yes	Latin alphabet	?		Command line
OCRopus	2007	1.3.3	2017	Apache	No	No	Yes	Yes	Yes	?	?	Python	?	All languages using Latin script (other languages can be trained)	Normal Latin script and Fraktur (other scripts can be trained)	TXT, hOCR, PDF	Pluggable framework under active development, used for Google Books
OmniPage	1970s	19.2	2015	Proprietary	Yes	Yes	Yes	Yes	No	?	?	C/C++, C#	Yes	125	Machine and handprinted fonts	DOC/DOCX XLS/XLSX PPTX RTF PDF PDF/A Searchable PDF HTML Text XML ePUB MP3	Product of Nuance Communications
Puma.NET	?	?	2009	BSD	No	Yes	No	No	No	?	?	C#	Yes	28	Any printed font		.NET OCR SDK based on Cognitive Technologies' CuneiForm recognition engine. Wraps Puma COM server and provides simplified API for .NET applications
ReadSoft	?	?	14?	Proprietary	No	Yes	No	No	No	?	?	?	?	?	?		Scan, capture and classify business documents such as invoices, forms and purchase orders integrated with business processes.
Scantron	?	?	?	Proprietary	No	Yes	No	No	No	?	?	?	?	?	?		For working with localized interfaces, corresponding language support is required.
SmartScore	1991	10.5.8	2015	Proprietary	No	Yes	Yes	No	No	?	?	?	?	?	?		For musical scores
Tesseract	1985	5.5.0	2024	Apache	No	Yes	Yes	Yes	Yes	?	?	C++, C	Yes	100+	Any printed font	Text, ALTO, hOCR, PAGE, PDF, others with different user interfaces or the API	Developed at HP Labs (1985–1995) and Google (2006–2018
Name	Founded year	Latest stable version	Latest release year	License	Online	Windows	Mac OS X	Linux	BSD	Android	iOS	Programming language	SDK?	Languages	Fonts	Output formats	Notes

== Evaluation ==
A 2016 analysis of the accuracy and reliability of the OCR packages Google Docs OCR, Tesseract, ABBYY FineReader, and Transym, employing a dataset including 1227 images from 15 different categories concluded Google Docs OCR and ABBYY to be performing better than others.
