= Analyzed Layout and Text Object =

Standard for describing text and layout in images of digitized documents

Analyzed Layout and Text Object (ALTO) is an open XML schema originally developed by the EU-funded METAe project. ALTO files describe the placement, size, and style of text in an image of a digitized document, as well as other elements of the document's layout, such as margins, headings, columns, and illustrations.

The text and placement information in ALTO files is usually generated by specialized optical character recognition (OCR) software, and is often used in combination with the Metadata Encoding and Transmission Standard (METS) to describe a larger digitized object (such as a book) and create references across ALTO files (such as pages), as might be necessary to describe a reading sequence.

From version 1.0 in June 2004 to 1.4 in 2007, ALTO was developed and maintained by Content Conversion Specialists (CCS) GmbH, Hamburg. In August 2009, maintenance for the schema was transferred to the Library of Congress, and from then overseen by a separate editorial board created for that purpose.

== Structure ==
An ALTO file consists of three major sections as children of the root <alto> element:

- <Description> section contains metadata about the ALTO file itself and processing information on how the file was created.
- <Styles> section contains the text and paragraph styles with their individual descriptions:
  - <TextStyle> has font descriptions
  - <ParagraphStyle> has paragraph descriptions, e.g. alignment information
- <Layout> section contains the content information. It is subdivided into <Page> elements.

<?xml version="1.0"?>
<alto>
  <Description>
    <MeasurementUnit/>
    <sourceImageInformation/>
    <Processing/>
  </Description>
  <Styles>
    <TextStyle/>
    <ParagraphStyle/>
  </Styles>
  <Layout>
    <Page>
      <TopMargin/>
      <LeftMargin/>
      <RightMargin/>
      <BottomMargin/>
      <PrintSpace/>
    </Page>
  </Layout>
</alto>

== Software support ==
- ABBYY FineReader
- eScriptorium
- Kitodo
- Tesseract
- Transkribus

== See also ==
- Metadata Encoding and Transmission Standard (METS)
- Dublin Core, an ISO metadata standard
- Preservation Metadata: Implementation Strategies (PREMIS)
- Open Archives Initiative Protocol for Metadata Harvesting (OAI-PMH)
- hOCR
- PAGE (XML)
