= Uskov =

Uskov (Russian: Усков), female Uskova is a Russian surname. Notable people with the surname include:

- Artem Uskov (born 2010), Russian chess player
- Olga Uskova (born 1964), Russian tech entrepreneur
- Valery Uskov (1933–2025), Russian film and television director
- Yana Uskova (born 1985), Russian handball player
