= Skew =

Skew may refer to:

== In mathematics ==
- Skew lines, neither parallel nor intersecting.
- Skew normal distribution, a probability distribution
- Skew field or division ring
- Skew-Hermitian matrix
- Skew lattice
- Skew polygon, whose vertices do not lie on a plane
- Infinite skew polyhedron
- Skew-symmetric graph
- Skew-symmetric matrix
- Skew tableau, a generalization of Young tableaux
- Skewness, a measure of the asymmetry of a probability distribution
- Shear mapping

== In science and technology ==
- Skew, also synclinal or gauche in alkane stereochemistry
- Skew ray (optics), an optical path not in a plane of symmetry
- Skew arch, not at a right angle

=== In computing ===
- Clock skew
- Transitive data skew, an issue of data synchronization

=== In telecommunications ===
- Skew (fax), unstraightness
- Skew (antenna) a method to improve the horizontal radiation pattern

== Other uses ==
- Volatility skew, in finance, a downward-sloping volatility smile
- SKEW, the ticker symbol for the CBOE Skew Index

== See also ==
- SKU or Stock-keeping unit
