= Page Analysis and Ground Truth Elements =

Page Analysis and Ground Truth Elements (PAGE) is an XML standard for encoding digitised documents. Comparable to Analyzed Layout and Text Object (ALTO), it allows the organisation and structure of a page and its contents to be described.

PAGE XML can be used to describe:

- page content (regions, lines of text, words, glyphs, reading order, text content, ...)
- the evaluation of the layout analysis (evaluation profiles, evaluation results, ...)
- the cutting of the document image (cutting grids)

The format is developed by the Pattern Recognition & Image Analysis Lab (PRIMA) at the University of Salford in Manchester.

It was designed to be used in conjunction with automatic segmentation and transcription techniques (optical character recognition (OCR) and handwritten text recognition (HTR)): indeed, PAGE aims to support each of the different steps in the processing chain for image document analysis (from image enhancement to layout analysis to OCR).

The PAGE XML schema is used as an export and import format by automatic transcription software such as eScriptorium and Transkribus. It is also an export format used by Kraken, a turnkey OCR system optimised for documents in historical and non-Latin scripts and by the OCR software Tesseract.
