= Data entry clerk =

Profession

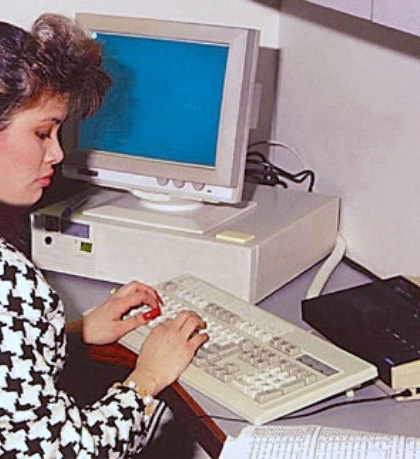
A data entry clerk

A data entry clerk, also known as data preparation and control operator, data registration and control operator, and data preparation and registration operator, is a member of staff employed to enter or update data into a computer system. Data is often entered into a computer from paper documents using a keyboard. The keyboards used can often have special keys and multiple colors to help in the task and speed up the work. Proper ergonomics at the workstation is a common topic considered.

The data entry clerk may also use a mouse, and a manually-fed scanner may be involved.

Speed and accuracy, not necessarily in that order, are the key measures of the job.

== History ==
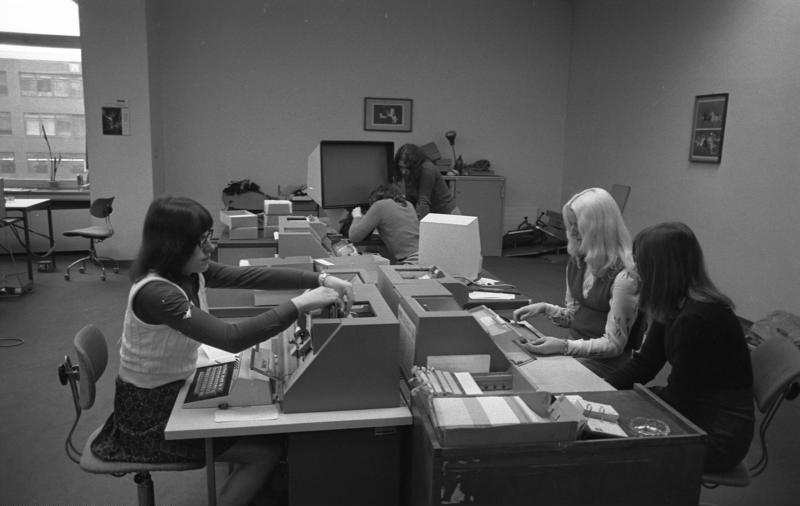
Keypunch operators at Volkswagen in 1973

The invention of punched card data processing in the 1890s created a demand for many workers, typically women, to run keypunch machines. To ensure accuracy, data was often entered twice; the second time a different keyboarding device, known as a verifier (such as the IBM 056) was used.

In the 1970s, punched card data entry was gradually replaced by the use of video display terminals.

== Examples ==
For a mailing company, data entry clerks might be required to type in reference numbers for items of mail which had failed to reach their destination, so that the relevant addresses could be deleted from the database used to send the mail out. If the company was compiling a database from addresses handwritten on a questionnaire, the person typing those into the database would be a data entry clerk. In a cash office, a data entry clerk might be required to type expenses into a database using numerical codes.

== Optical character/mark recognition ==
With to the advance of technology, many data entry clerks no longer work with hand-written documents. Instead, the documents are first scanned by a combined OCR/OMR system (optical character recognition and optical mark recognition,) which attempts to read the documents and process the data electronically. The accuracy of OCR varies widely based upon the quality of the original document as well as the scanned image; hence the ongoing need for data entry clerks. Although OCR technology is continually being developed, many tasks still require a data entry clerk to review the results afterward to check the accuracy of the data and to manually key in any missed or incorrect information.

An example of this system would be one commonly used to document health insurance claims, such as for Medicaid in the United States. In many systems, the hand-written forms are first scanned into digital images (JPEG, PNG, bitmap, etc.). These files are then processed by the optical character recognition system, where many fields are completed by the computerized optical scanner. When the OCR software has low confidence in a data field, it is flagged for review – not the entire record but just the single field. The data entry clerk then manually reviews the data already entered by OCR, corrects it if needed, and fills in any missing data by simultaneously viewing the image on-screen.

The accuracy of personal records, as well as billing or financial information, is usually very important to the general public as well as the healthcare provider. Sensitive or vital information such as this is often checked many times, by both clerk and machine, before being accepted.

== Job requirements, security, and pay ==
Accuracy is usually more important than speed, because detection and correction of errors can be very time-consuming. Staying focused and speed are also required.

The job is usually low-skilled, so veteran staff are often employed on a temporary basis after a large survey or census has been completed. However, most companies handling large amounts of data on a regular basis will spread the contracts and workload across the year and will hire part-time.

The role of data entry clerks working with physical hand-written documents is on the decline in the developed world, because employees within a company frequently enter their own data, as it is collected now, instead of having a different employee do this task. An example of this is an operator working in a call center or a cashier in a shop. Cost is another reason for the decline. Data entry is labor-intensive for large batches and therefore expensive, so large companies will sometimes outsource the work, either locally or to third-world countries where there is no shortage of cheaper unskilled labor.

As of 2016, the median pay was between $19,396 and $34,990 in the United States.

As of 2018, The New York Times was still carrying ads for the job title Data Entry Clerk.

== Education and training ==
To get a job of a data entry clerk, competent math and English skills is necessary. The worker must be familiar with office software, such as word processors, databases, and spreadsheets. Entry clerks often need quickness, focus, and customer service skills.

Education higher than a high school diploma is often not required, but some companies require a bachelor's degree. Companies also hope the worker will have one year of experience in a related field.
