= EScriptorium =

OCR software

eScriptorium
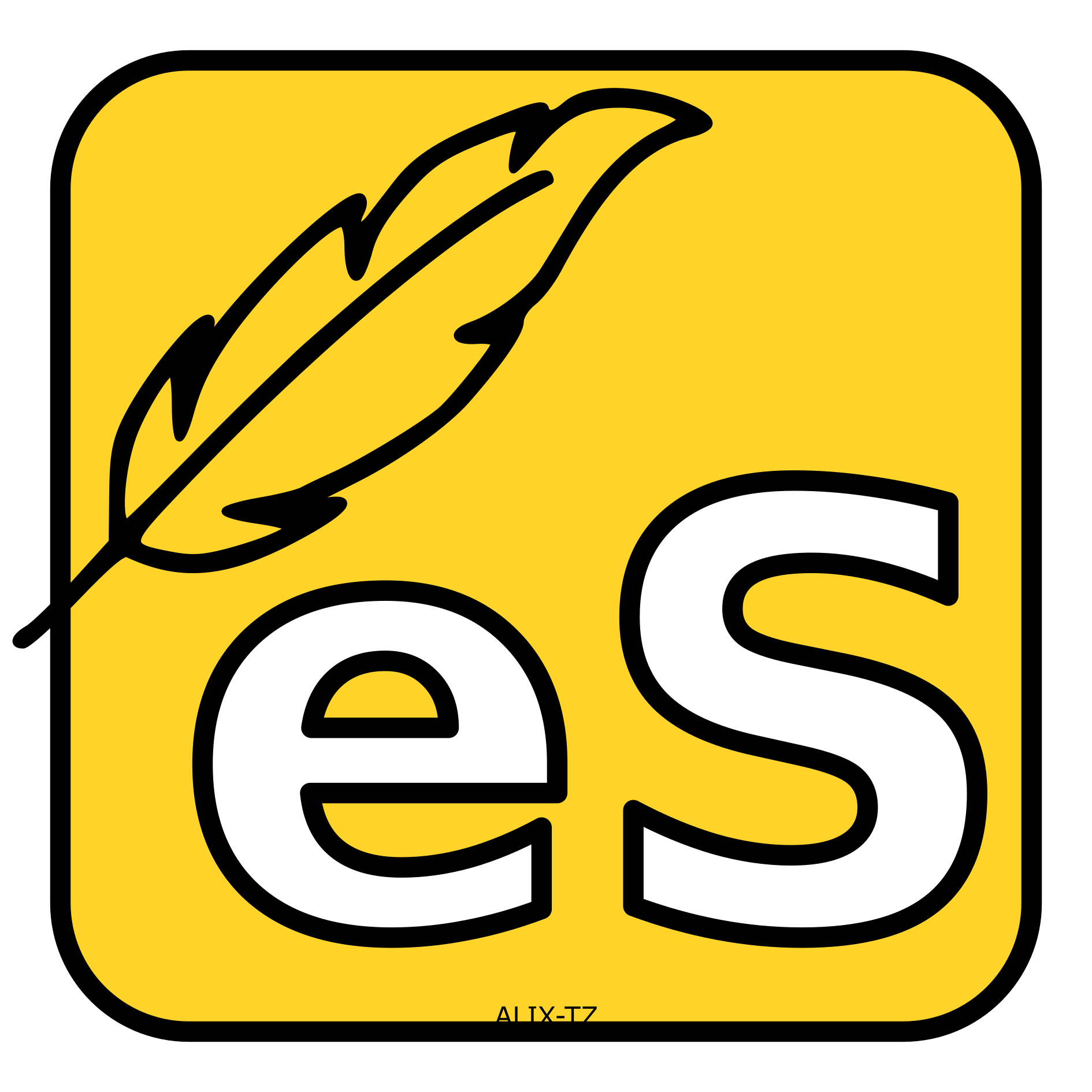

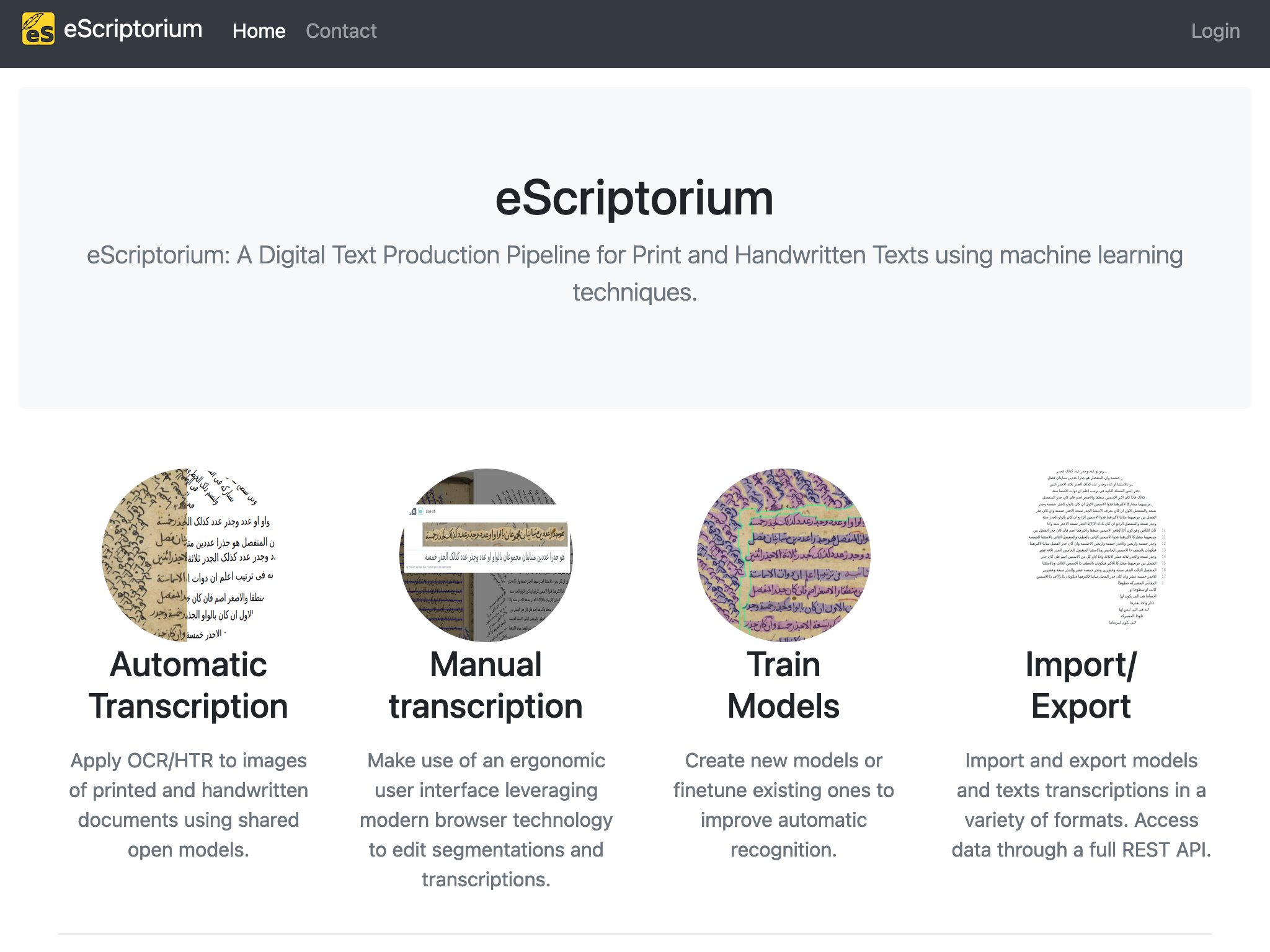
- Initial release: 2018; 8 years ago
- Repository: gitlab.com/scripta/escriptorium
- Operating system: platform independent

eScriptorium is a platform for manual or automated segmentation and text recognition of historical manuscripts and prints.

== Details ==
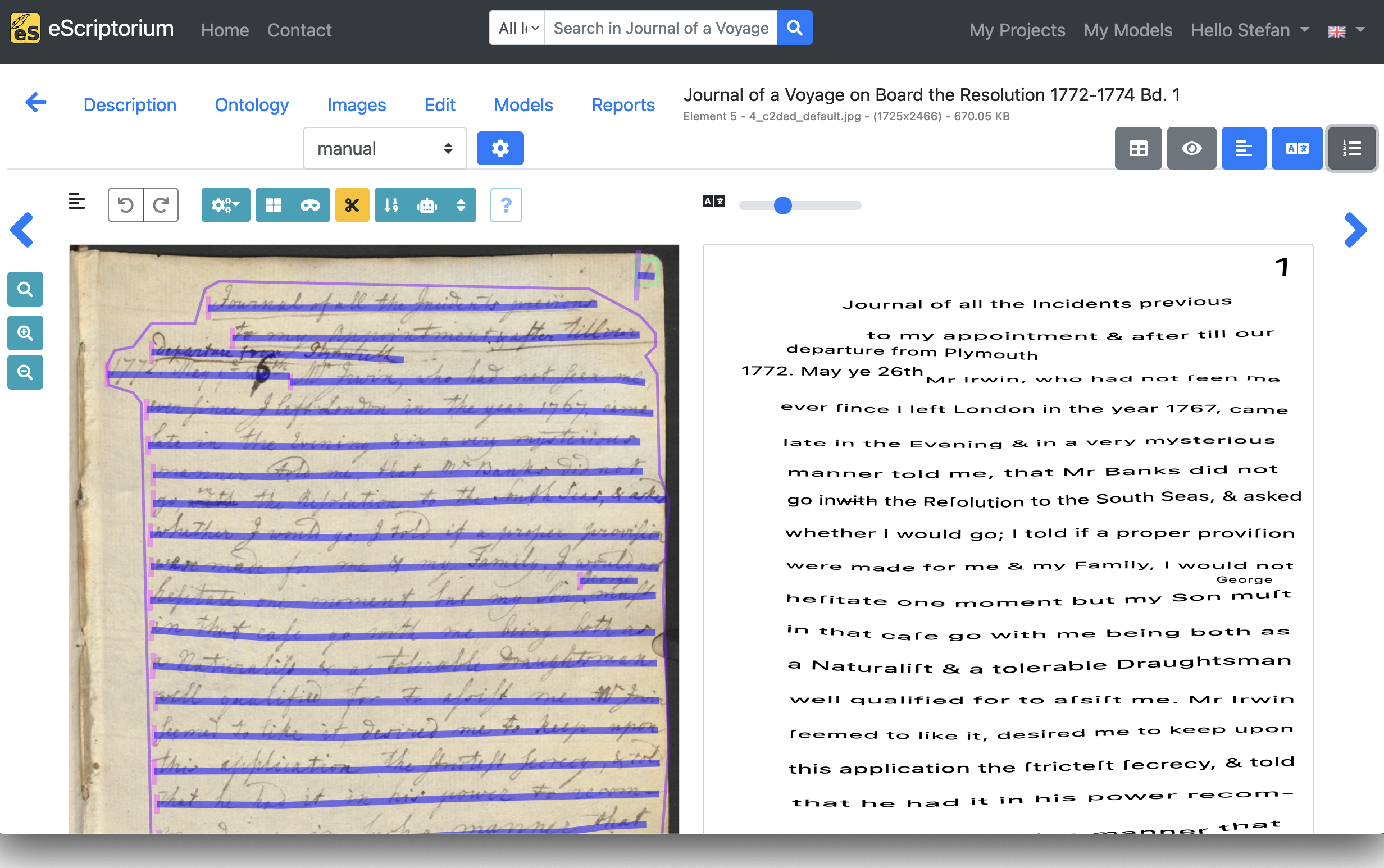
Screenshot with eScriptorium transcription of Johann Reinhold Forster's diary Journal of a Voyage on Board the Resolution 1772-1774 Vol. 1

The software is an open source software developed at the Paris Sciences et Lettres University as part of the projects Scripta and RESILIENCE with contributions from other institutions, partly funded by the EU's Horizon 2020 funding program and a grant from the Andrew W. Mellon Foundation.

Scanned pages from manuscripts and prints can be imported into eScriptorium and exported as text in various formats (text, ALTO or PAGE XML, TEI). The text areas with text lines in the images are first recognized manually or automatically (segmentation). The text lines are then transcribed manually or automatically.

Both automatic segmentation and text recognition can be trained using manually created or corrected examples (ground truth). The new models created in this way can be shared with others and can therefore be easily reused.

eScriptorium is built on top of the free OCR software Kraken by Benjamin Kiessling, a derivative of the OCR software OCRopus, which is suitable for handwritten and printed texts and also supports scripts such as Hebrew and Arabic, which are written from right to left.

Comparable programs that offer similar functions to eScriptorium are OCR4All and Transkribus.
