= E-aksharayan =

OCR engine for Indian languages

e-Aksharayan
- Written in: C++
- Operating system: Linux (32 & 64-bit), Windows (32-bit)
- Available in: Interface: English; Recognition: Assamese, Bengali, Bodo, Devanagari, Kannada, Gujarati, Gurumukhi, Oriya, Malayalam, Meitei, Marathi, Tamil, Telugu, Tibetan and Urdu
- Type: Optical character recognition
- Website: ocr.tdil-dc.gov.in

Bangla typos

e-Aksharayan is an optical character recognition engine for Indian languages. Some of research work from e-Aksharayan has been published in different conferences and journals.

== Screenshots ==
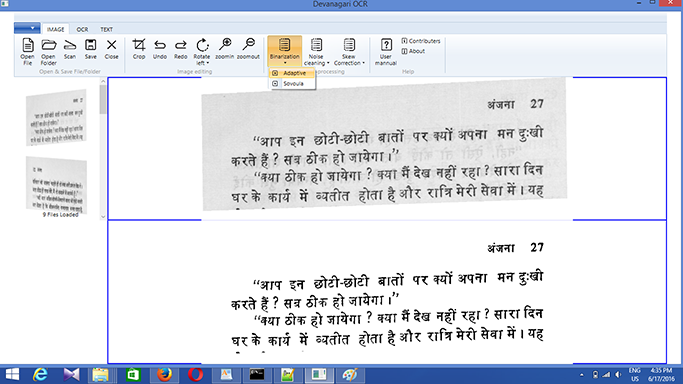
OCR output for Devanagari

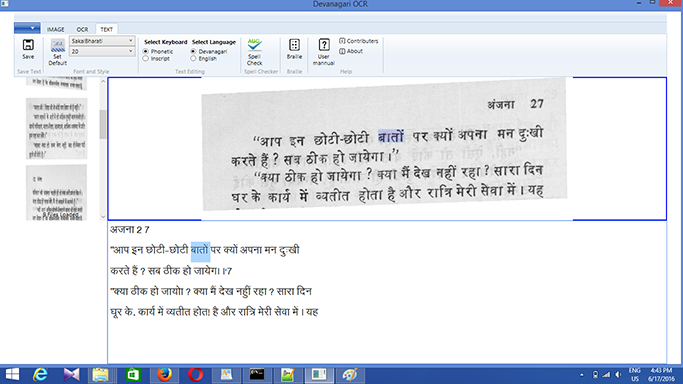
OCR output for Devanagari OCR output for Devanagari, sync between image and output

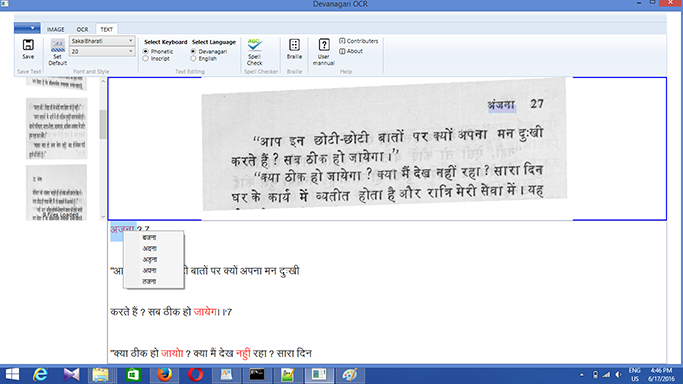
OCR output for Devanagari OCR output for Devanagari, spell checker
