= Thoggen =

Open source DVD ripper software

- Thoggen main window
- Stable release: 0.7.1 / 12 June 2008
- Written in: C
- Operating system: Linux
- Type: DVD-Rip
- License: GPL-2.0-or-later
- Website: http://www.thoggen.net/
- Repository: thoggen.git.sourceforge.net/gitroot/thoggen/thoggen

Thoggen is a DVD ripper for Linux within the GNOME project. It is based on GStreamer and GTK+. Thoggen can back up DVDs by re-encoding them using the Ogg Theora video codec. Thoggen aims to be easy and straightforward to use, by hiding complexity and offering sensible defaults.

== Features ==
- Encodes into Ogg/Theora video.
- Based on the GStreamer multimedia framework.
- Supports title preview, picture cropping and resizing.
- Language Selection for audio track.
- Can encode from local directory with video DVD files.

== Weaknesses ==
- Thoggen is slow.

The Theora implementation used is far from optimized, and at full DVD resolution, encoding can slow down to the single-digit frames-per-second count, meaning several hours are required."

- Thoggen can only encode video into the Theora codec. Since the software is based on the GStreamer multimedia framework, it may be possible to add additional encoding formats/codecs in future versions.
- Thoggen includes a feature to "make video certain quality". However, the numerics to choose from (ranging from 0 to 63) for the encoding process are less-than-obvious to interpret for users.
- Subtitles are not yet supported.

== See also ==
- Theora
- MEncoder
- List of GTK+ applications
- List of video editing software
- Comparison of DVD ripper software
