= GOCR =

- Developer(s): Jörg Schulenburg
- Initial release: December 2000; 24 years ago
- Stable release: 0.52 / October 15, 2018; 6 years ago
- Written in: C
- Operating system: Linux, Windows, OS/2
- Type: Optical character recognition
- License: GNU General Public License
- Website: www-e.uni-magdeburg.de/jschulen/ocr/ jocr.sourceforge.net

GOCR (or JOCR) is a free optical character recognition program, initially written by Jörg Schulenburg. It can be used to convert or scan image files (portable pixmap or PCX) into text files.

== Features ==
GOCR claims it can handle single-column sans-serif fonts of 20–60 pixels in height. It reports trouble with serif fonts, overlapping characters, handwritten text, heterogeneous fonts, noisy images, large angles of skew, and text in anything other than a Latin alphabet.

GOCR can also translate barcodes.

== User interface ==
GOCR can be used as a stand-alone command-line application, or as a back-end to other programs. It comes with a gocr.tcl graphic interface. GOCR can be also used as an OCR engine in OCRFeeder.

== Development ==
Version 0.3.0 was released in December 2000, 0.3.5 in February 2002, and 0.37 in August 2002.

Between version 0.40 (March 2005) and 0.43 (December 2006), the recognition engine was gradually replaced with a vector version.

Version 0.48 was released in August 2009.

Version 0.49 was released in September 2010.

Version 0.50 was released in March 2013.

Version 0.51 was released in August 2017.

== Nomenclature ==
The application was originally named GOCR which stands for GNU Optical Character Recognition. When it came time to register the project on SourceForge the name GOCR was already taken so the project was registered as JOCR (Jörg's Optical Character Recognition).

As a result of this situation the project and application are known as both GOCR and JOCR. Schulenburg admits that this is problematic.

== Formats ==
Acceptable image formats are:

- PNM
- PBM
- PGM
- PPM
- PCX (some)
- TGA

Other formats are automatically converted using netpbm-progs, gzip and bzip2 via the use of a unix pipe. These images types include:

- pnm.gz
- pnm.bz2
- PNG
- JPG
- TIFF
- GIF
- BMP
