= Transkribus =

Software for analysis of historical documents

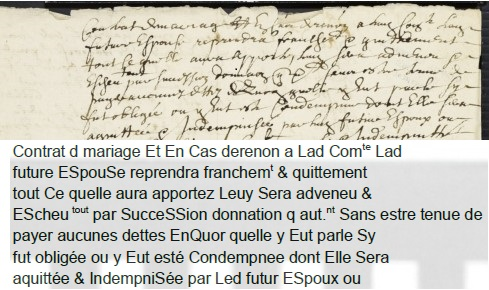
- Developer: READ-COOP
- Website: www.transkribus.org

Transkribus is a platform for the text recognition, image analysis and structure recognition of historical documents.

The platform was created in the context of the two EU projects "tranScriptorium" (2013–2015) and "READ" (Recognition and Enrichment of Archival Documents – 2016–2019). It was developed by the University of Innsbruck. Since July 1, 2019 the platform has been directed and further developed by the READ-COOP, a non-profit cooperative.

The platform integrates tools developed by research groups throughout Europe.

Comparable programs that offer similar functions are eScriptorium and OCR4All.
