= Olga Uskova =

Russian entrepreneur

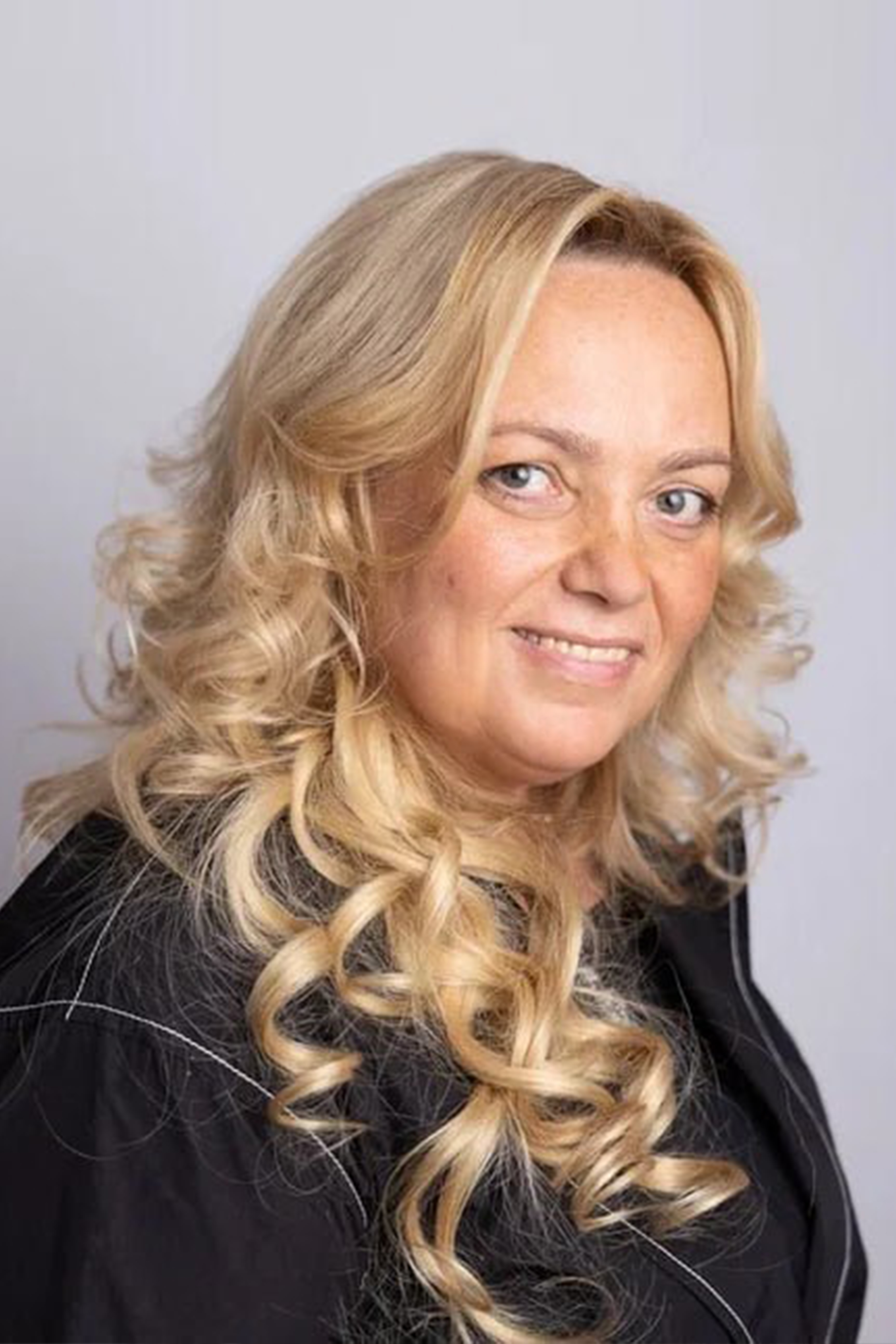
Portrait of Olga Uskova

Olga Uskova (born February 26, 1964) is a Russian tech entrepreneur, investor and philanthropist. She is a founder and president of Cognitive Technologies, one of the leading software development companies in Russia and Eastern Europe. Since 2012 she is head of the Department of Engineering Cybernetics at National University of Science and Technology MISiS.

== Biography ==
Uskova was born in Moscow into a family of programmers. Her father, Anatoly Uskov, a Russian computer scientist, was head of the Artificial Intelligence Laboratory at the Scientific Research Institute for System Analysis of the Russian Academy of Sciences, developer of the first world champion chess program Kaissa. Her mother was chief engineer at the Russian Railways automation projects in 1980s. Both graduated from Moscow State University.

In 1989, Uskova graduated with honour from MISIS National University of Science and Technology in Moscow. In 1991, she became a PhD in Science, majoring in AI research.

In 1992, she founded the Cognitive Technologies group of companies. A year later, the company signed a $1 million contract with Corel Corp for the supply of Cuneiform OCR system. Two years later, all Hewlett-Packard scanners in Russia came with Cognitive Technologies software. It was the first contract with HP for an Eastern European company.

As of 2016, Cognitive Technologies was the second largest IT developer in Russia with 8 offices and over 1200 employees.

Under the guidance of Olga Uskova, Cognitive Technologies has been cooperating with IT companies since early 1990s. Cognitive Technologies signed OEM contracts and business agreements with several IT-companies, including IBM, Canon, Corel, Samsung, Xerox, Brother, Epson, and Olivetti.

In 1998 Cognitive Technologies became the first company in Eastern Europe to get the Oracle Complementary Software Provider status.

Among the most prominent projects under Olga Uskova are:

- 2001, Russian Speech Recognition Corps for Intel;
- 2002, nation-wide public election system automation;
- 2004, nation-wide EMERCOM 112 system automation;
- 2006, passport scanning and recognition system for state border control service;
- 2008, first Russian IT accelerator in Moscow region called Chernogolovka;
- 2008, establishment of the Cognitive Pilot division and launch of an R&D project on AI/CV for driverless cars;
- 2009, first Russian e-Marketplace (SETonline.ru), an “ebay for B2B”;
- 2010, first Russian e-Marketplace for state public procurement (UETP, roseltorg.ru) with more than 31B in yearly trade volume;
- 2010, text parsing module for Yandex;
- 2010, intelligent document recognition technologies with NVIDIA;
- 2013, ECM system E1 by Cognitive named #2 in Russia by IDC;
- 2014, Gazprom e-Purchasing system for more than 2M users;
- 2015, Rosneft e-Purchasing system for more than 1,5M users;
- 2013-2016, driverless truck on KAMAZ chassis project;
- 2014-2016, driverless harvester on Rostselmash chassis project;
- 2016, C-Pilot ADS level 2 system;
- 2017, Cognitive Imaging radar project;
- 2018, Cognitive Tram Pilot project.

In 2006, Uskova became head of the non-profit “National Association for Innovations and Development of Information Technologies”, a project in Russia to help young teams to get public grants from different Russian institutions. More than 1200 startups went through the program and were financed.

In 2012, she became Head of Engineering in the Cybernetics Department at MISIS National University of Science and Technology in Moscow. She introduced an innovative approach to teaching computer science, providing deep and interactive students’ involvement into real projects and challenging tasks. Under her supervision and sponsorship MISIS team for competitive programming made it to the worldwide finals at the ASM ICPC in 2014-2015 and semi-finals in 2016-2017.

In 2013, she founded the Russian Abstract Art Foundation, an NGO aimed at supporting academic and historical understanding of Russian abstract art in the global context. The Foundation has more than 600 unique works and its own gallery space in Moscow. Activities include support for young painters, art-therapy for disabled children, community support for feminist artists.

In 2014-2016, Uskova joined the steering committee of a non-profit think-tank appointed by the State Russian Duma to elaborate new legislation on AI and robotics.
