= Scribes (software) =

Text editor

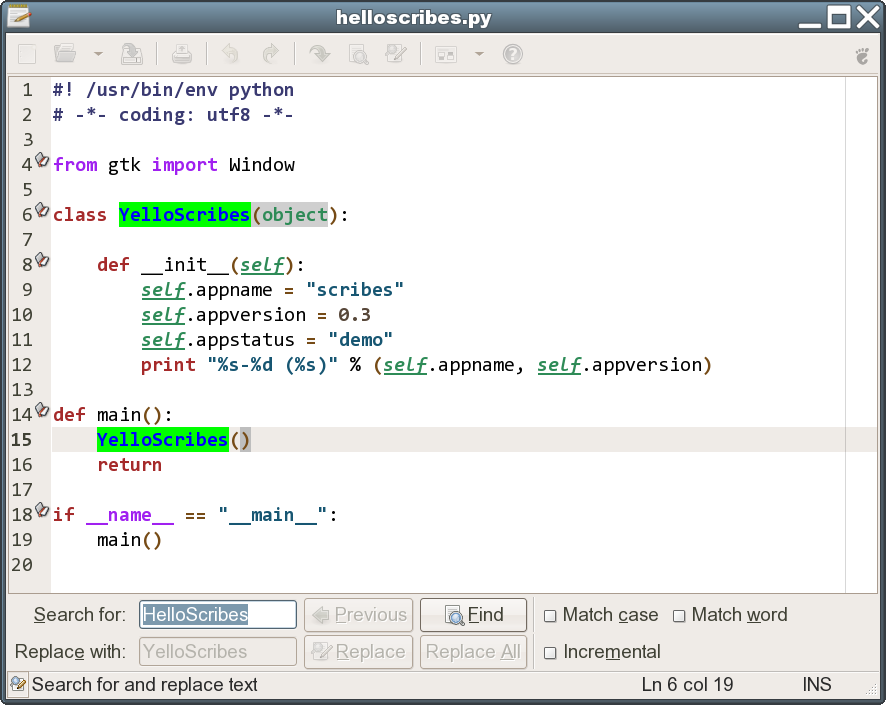
- Scribes showing 'replace' function
- Developer: Lateef Alabi-Oki
- Stable release: 0.3.3.3 (5 January 2008) [±]
- Written in: Python
- Operating system: Unix-like
- Type: Text editor
- License: GPL-2.0-or-later
- Website: scribes.sourceforge.net

Scribes is a minimalist lightweight free text editor Linux and BSD designed for the GNOME desktop licensed under the terms of the GPL-2.0-or-later license. It was created by Lateef Alabi-Oki and programmed in Python.

== Features ==
Scribes supports Python plugins, remote editing with FTP, SFTP, Secure Shell, Samba, and WebDAV, and autosave. It also supports code snippets, auto-indentation, hotkeys, bookmarks, templates, and automatic word completion or replacement. Scribes has syntax highlighting support for around 70 different programming languages, including PHP, Java XML, and HTML. Editing icons are hidden from view until a user mouses over the area.

Scribes does not support tabs, instead opening every new file in a separate window. A document switcher is provided to switch between windows by pressing F9.

The interface supports multiple different color themes.

== Reception ==
LinuxInsider stated that Scribes was a "revolutionary approach to working with a text editor" though noting that the interface took some time getting used to. Linux.com said that "after 30 minutes of usage, you will either love it or hate it." RedMonk.com praised the "rethink everything" approach of the editor.
