= Skew (fax) =

Angular deviation of received frames in faxes

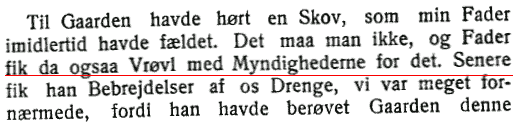
Example of +1 degree (counter-clockwise) skew in a facsimile image. The red line is perfectly horizontal.

In fax systems, skew is the angular deviation of the received frame from rectangularity caused by asynchronism between the scanner and the recorder. This is the same as the angle between the scanning line, or recording line, and the perpendicular to the paper path.

Skew is expressed numerically as the tangent of the deviation angle.

Skew detection and correction can be automatically applied by the receiving machine.
