= Tesseract (software) =

Free optical character recognition engine

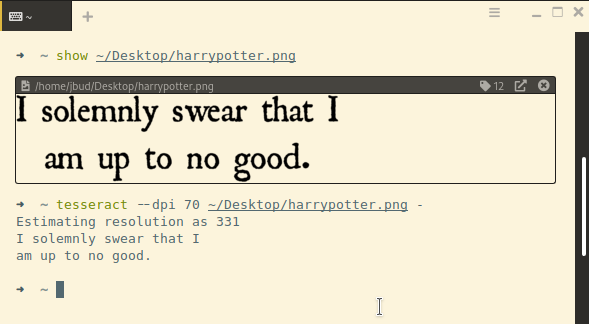
- Tesseract 4.1.1 reading an image
- Original authors: Ray Smith, Hewlett-Packard
- Developers: Google and others
- Stable release: 5.5.3 / 24 July 2026
- Written in: C++
- Operating system: Linux, Windows, and macOS
- Available in: Interface: English; Recognition: Afrikaans, Albanian, Amharic, Arabic, Armenian, Assamese, Azerbaijani, Basque, Belarusian, Bengali, Bosnian, Breton, Bulgarian, Burmese, Catalan, Cebuano, Cherokee, Chinese, Corsican, Croatian, Czech, Danish, Dutch, Dzongkha, English, Esperanto, Estonian, Faroese, Finnish, French, Galician, Georgian, German, Greek, Gujarati, Haitian Creole, Hebrew, Hindi, Hungarian, Icelandic, Indonesian, Inuktitut, Irish, Italian, Japanese, Javanese, Kannada, Kazakh, Khmer, Korean, Kurdish, Kyrgyz, Lao, Latin, Latvian, Lithuanian, Luxembourgish. Malayalam, Macedonian, Maltese, Malay, Maori, Marathi, Mongolian, Nepali, Norwegian, Occitan, Oriya, Pashto, Persian, Polish, Portuguese, Punjabi, Quechua, Romanian, Russian, Sanskrit, Scottish Gaelic, Serbian, Sindhi, Sinhala, Slovak, Slovenian, Spanish, Sundanese, Swahili, Swedish, Syriac, Tagalog, Tajik, Tamil, Tatar, Telugu, Thai, Tibetan, Tigrinya, Tongan, Turkish, Ukrainian, Urdu, Uyghur, Uzbek, Vietnamese, Welsh, West Frisian, Yiddish, Yoruba (more can be added using included training files)
- Type: Optical character recognition
- License: Apache License 2.0
- Website: github.com/tesseract-ocr
- Repository: github.com/tesseract-ocr/tesseract.git

Tesseract is an optical character recognition engine for various operating systems. It is free software, released under the Apache License. Originally developed by Hewlett-Packard as proprietary software in the 1980s, it was released as open source in 2005 and development was sponsored by Google in 2006.

In 2006, Tesseract was considered one of the most accurate open-source OCR engines available.

== History ==
The Tesseract engine was originally developed as proprietary software at Hewlett-Packard labs in Bristol, England and Greeley, Colorado, United States between 1985 and 1994, with more changes made in 1996 to port to Windows, and partial migration from C to C++ in 1998. A majority of the code was written in C, some written in C++. Since then, all the code has been converted to C++. Very little work was done in the following decade. It was then released as an open source in 2005 by Hewlett-Packard and the University of Nevada, Las Vegas (UNLV). Tesseract development was sponsored by Google in 2006.

Version 4 (released in 2018) adds LSTM-based OCR engine and models for many additional languages and scripts, bringing the total to 116 languages. Additionally, 37 scripts are supported.

Since 2018, the Mannheim University Library has contributed to the development of Tesseract through several projects. Most of these were funded by the German Research Foundation.

Version 5 was released in 2021.

== Development ==
Tesseract was in the top three OCR engines in terms of character accuracy in 1995. It is available for Linux, Windows and Mac OS X.

Tesseract, up to and including version 2 (released 2007), could only accept TIFF images of simple one-column text as inputs. These early versions did not include layout analysis, and so inputting multi-columned text, images, or equations produced garbled output. Since version 3 (released in 2010), Tesseract has supported output text formatting, hOCR positional information and page-layout analysis. Support for a number of new image formats was added using the Leptonica library. Tesseract can detect whether text is monospaced or proportionally spaced.

The initial versions of Tesseract could only recognize English-language text.

Tesseract v2 added six additional Western languages (French, Italian, German, Spanish, Brazilian Portuguese, Dutch).

Version 3 extended language support significantly to include ideographic (Chinese & Japanese) and right-to-left (e.g. Arabic, Hebrew) languages, as well as many more scripts. New languages included Arabic, Bulgarian, Catalan, Chinese (Simplified and Traditional), Croatian, Czech, Danish, German (Fraktur script), Greek, Finnish, Hebrew, Hindi, Hungarian, Indonesian, Japanese, Korean, Latvian, Lithuanian, Norwegian, Polish, Portuguese, Romanian, Russian, Serbian, Slovak (standard and Fraktur script), Slovenian, Swedish, Tagalog, Tamil, Thai, Turkish, Ukrainian and Vietnamese.

V3.04, released in July 2015, added an additional 39 language/script combinations, bringing the total count of support languages to over 100. New language codes included: amh (Amharic), asm (Assamese), aze_cyrl (Azerbaijana in Cyrillic script), bod (Tibetan), bos (Bosnian), ceb (Cebuano), cym (Welsh), dzo (Dzongkha), fas (Persian), gle (Irish), guj (Gujarati), hat (Haitian and Haitian Creole), iku (Inuktitut), jav (Javanese), kat (Georgian), kat_old (Old Georgian), kaz (Kazakh), khm (Central Khmer), kir (Kyrgyz), kur (Kurdish), lao (Lao), lat (Latin), mar (Marathi), mya (Burmese), nep (Nepali), ori (Oriya), pan (Punjabi), pus (Pashto), san (Sanskrit), sin (Sinhala), srp_latn (Serbian in Latin script), syr (Syriac), tgk (Tajik), tir (Tigrinya), uig (Uyghur), urd (Urdu), uzb (Uzbek), uzb_cyrl (Uzbek in Cyrillic script), yid (Yiddish). It can be trained to work in other languages.

Accuracy rates for other language processing were shown in a presentation at DAS 2016, Santorini by Ray Smith.

Tesseract is suitable for use as a backend and can be used for more complicated OCR tasks including layout analysis by using a frontend such as OCRopus.

Tesseract's output will have very poor quality if the input images are not preprocessed to suit it: Images (especially screenshots) must be scaled up such that the text x-height is at least 20 pixels, any rotation or skew must be corrected or no text will be recognized, low-frequency changes in brightness must be high-pass filtered, or Tesseract's binarization stage will destroy much of the page, and dark borders must be manually removed, or they will be misinterpreted as characters.

== User interfaces ==
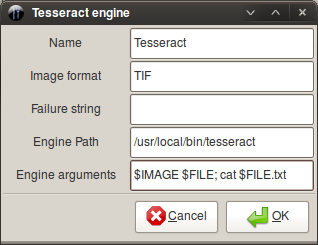
Tesseract configuration window in OCRFeeder

Tesseract is executed from the command-line interface. While Tesseract is not supplied with a GUI, there are many separate projects which provide a GUI for it. One common example is OCRFeeder. A cross-platform open-source GUI is gImageReader

== Reception ==
In a July 2007 article on Tesseract, Anthony Kay of Linux Journal termed it "a quirky command-line tool that does an outstanding job". At that time he noted "Tesseract is a bare-bones OCR engine. The build process is a little quirky, and the engine needs some additional features (such as layout detection), but the core feature, text recognition, is drastically better than anything else I've tried from the Open Source community. It is reasonably easy to get excellent recognition rates using nothing more than a scanner and some image tools, such as The GIMP and Netpbm."

In November 2020, Brewster Kahle from the Internet Archive praised Tesseract, saying:

Tesseract has made a major step forward in the last few years. When we last evaluated the accuracy it was not as good as the proprietary OCR, but that has changed– we have done evaluations and it is just as good, and can get better for our application because of its new architecture.

== See also ==
- LibTIFF
