= Optical character recognition =

Computer recognition of visual text

Video of the process of scanning and real-time optical character recognition (OCR) with a portable scanner

Optical character recognition (OCR) or optical character reader is the electronic or mechanical conversion of images of typed, handwritten or printed text into machine-encoded text, whether from a scanned document, a photo of a document, a scene photo (for example the text on signs and billboards in a landscape photo) or from subtitle text superimposed on an image (for example: from a television broadcast).

Widely used as a form of data entry from printed paper data records – whether passport documents, invoices, bank statements, computerized receipts, business cards, mail, printed data, or any suitable documentation – it is a common method of digitizing printed texts so that they can be electronically edited, searched, stored more compactly, displayed online, and used in machine processes such as cognitive computing, machine translation, (extracted) text-to-speech, key data and text mining. OCR is a field of research in pattern recognition, artificial intelligence and computer vision.

Early versions needed to be trained with images of each character, and worked on one font at a time. Advanced systems capable of producing a high degree of accuracy for most fonts are now common, and with support for a variety of image file format inputs. Some systems are capable of reproducing formatted output that closely approximates the original page including images, columns, and other non-textual components.

== History ==
Early optical character recognition may be traced to technologies involving telegraphy and creating reading devices for the blind. In 1915, Hyman Eli Goldberg was granted a patent for a device that read perforated or conductive-ink characters and converted them into standard telegraph code (US Patent 1165663). Concurrently, Edmund Fournier d'Albe developed the Optophone, a handheld scanner that when moved across a printed page, produced tones that corresponded to specific letters or characters.

In the late 1920s and into the 1930s, Emanuel Goldberg developed what he called a "Statistical Machine" for searching microfilm archives using an optical code recognition system. In 1931, he was granted US Patent number 1,838,389 for the invention.

In 1974, Ray Kurzweil started the company Kurzweil Computer Products, Inc. and continued development of omni-font OCR, which could recognize text printed in virtually any font. (Kurzweil is often credited with inventing omni-font OCR, but it was in use by companies, including CompuScan, in the late 1960s and 1970s.) Kurzweil used the technology to create a reading machine for blind people to have a computer read text to them out loud. The device included a CCD-type flatbed scanner and a text-to-speech synthesizer. On January 13, 1976, the finished product was unveiled during a widely reported news conference headed by Kurzweil and the leaders of the National Federation of the Blind. In 1978, Kurzweil Computer Products began selling a commercial version of the optical character recognition computer program. LexisNexis was one of the first customers, and bought the program to upload legal paper and news documents onto its nascent online databases. Two years later, Kurzweil sold his company to Xerox, which eventually spun it off as Scansoft, which merged with Nuance Communications.

In the 2000s, OCR became available as online and cloud-based services, and in mobile applications like real-time translation of foreign-language signs on a smartphone. With the advent of smartphones and smartglasses, OCR can be used in internet connected mobile device applications that extract text captured using the device's camera.

== Applications ==
OCR engines have been developed into software applications specializing in various subjects such as receipts, invoices, checks, and legal billing documents.

The software can be used for:

- Entering data for business documents, e.g. checks, passports, invoices, bank statements and receipts
- Automatic number-plate recognition
- Passport recognition and information extraction in airports
- Automatically extracting key information from insurance documents
- Traffic-sign recognition
- Extracting business card information into a contact list
- Creating textual versions of printed documents, e.g. book scanning for Project Gutenberg
- Making electronic images of printed documents searchable, e.g. Google Books
- Converting handwriting in real-time to control a computer (pen computing)
- Defeating or testing the robustness of CAPTCHA anti-bot systems, though these are specifically designed to prevent OCR.
- Assistive technology for blind and visually impaired users
- Writing instructions for vehicles by identifying CAD images in a database that are appropriate to the vehicle design as it changes in real time
- Making scanned documents searchable by converting them to PDFs
- Translating image files that contain text

Various commercial and open source OCR systems are available for most common writing systems, including Latin, Cyrillic, Arabic, Hebrew, Indic, Bengali (Bangla), Devanagari, Tamil, Chinese, Japanese, and Korean characters;

== Types ==
- Optical character recognition (OCR) – targets typewritten text, one glyph or character at a time.
- Optical word recognition – targets typewritten text, one word at a time (for languages that use a space as a word divider). Usually just called "OCR".
- Intelligent character recognition (ICR) – also targets handwritten printscript or cursive text one glyph or character at a time, usually involving machine learning.
- Intelligent word recognition (IWR) – also targets handwritten printscript or cursive text, one word at a time. This is especially useful for languages where glyphs are not separated in cursive script.

OCR is generally an offline process, which analyses a static document. There are cloud based services which provide an online OCR API service. Handwriting movement analysis can be used as input to handwriting recognition. Instead of merely using the shapes of glyphs and words, this technique is able to capture motion, such as the order in which segments are drawn, the direction, and the pattern of putting the pen down and lifting it. This additional information can make the process more accurate. This technology is also known as "online character recognition", "dynamic character recognition", "real-time character recognition", and "intelligent character recognition".

== Techniques ==
=== Pre-processing ===
OCR software often pre-processes images to improve the chances of successful recognition. Techniques include:

- De-skewing – if the document was not aligned properly when scanned, it may need to be tilted a few degrees clockwise or counterclockwise in order to make lines of text perfectly horizontal or vertical.
- Despeckling – removal of positive and negative spots, smoothing edges
- Binarization – conversion of an image from color or greyscale to black-and-white (called a binary image because there are two colors). The task is performed as a simple way of separating the text (or any other desired image component) from the background. The task of binarization is necessary since most commercial recognition algorithms work only on binary images, as it is simpler to do so. In addition, the effectiveness of binarization influences to a significant extent the quality of character recognition, and careful decisions are made in the choice of the binarization employed for a given input image type; since the quality of the method used to obtain the binary result depends on the type of image (scanned document, scene text image, degraded historical document, etc.).
- Line removal – Cleaning up non-glyph boxes and lines
- Layout analysis or zoning – Identification of columns, paragraphs, captions, etc. as distinct blocks. Especially important in multi-column layouts and tables.
- Line and word detection – Establishment of a baseline for word and character shapes, separating words as necessary.
- Script recognition – In multilingual documents, the script may change at the level of the words and hence, identification of the script is necessary, before the right OCR can be invoked to handle the specific script.
- Character isolation or segmentation – For per-character OCR, multiple characters that are connected due to image artifacts must be separated; single characters that are broken into multiple pieces due to artifacts must be connected.
- Normalization of aspect ratio and scale

Segmentation of fixed-pitch fonts is accomplished relatively simply by aligning the image to a uniform grid based on where vertical grid lines will least often intersect black areas. For proportional fonts, more sophisticated techniques are needed because whitespace between letters can sometimes be greater than that between words, and vertical lines can intersect more than one character.

=== Text recognition ===
There are two basic types of core OCR algorithm, which may produce a ranked list of candidate characters.

- Matrix matching involves comparing an image to a stored glyph on a pixel-by-pixel basis; it is also known as pattern matching, pattern recognition, or image correlation. This relies on the input glyph being correctly isolated from the rest of the image, and the stored glyph being in a similar font and at the same scale. This technique works best with typewritten text and does not work well when new fonts are encountered. This is the technique early physical photocell-based OCR implemented, rather directly.
- Feature extraction decomposes glyphs into "features" like lines, closed loops, line direction, and line intersections. The extraction features reduces the dimensionality of the representation and makes the recognition process computationally efficient. These features are compared with an abstract vector-like representation of a character, which might reduce to one or more glyph prototypes. General techniques of feature detection in computer vision are applicable to this type of OCR, which is commonly seen in "intelligent" handwriting recognition and most modern OCR software. Nearest neighbour classifiers such as the k-nearest neighbors algorithm are used to compare image features with stored glyph features and choose the nearest match.

Software such as Cuneiform and Tesseract use a two-pass approach to character recognition. The second pass is known as adaptive recognition and uses the letter shapes recognized with high confidence on the first pass to better recognize the remaining letters on the second pass. This is advantageous for unusual fonts or low-quality scans where the font is distorted (e.g. blurred or faded).

As of 2024, modern OCR software includes Google Docs OCR, ABBYY FineReader, Transym, and open source engines like Tesseract 5 (which introduced an LSTM-based recognition engine), PaddleOCR (a multilingual OCR toolkit supporting over 80 languages), and TrOCR (a transformer-based model developed by Microsoft for handwritten and printed text recognition). Others like OCRopus and Tesseract use neural networks which are trained to recognize whole lines of text instead of focusing on single characters.

A technique known as iterative OCR automatically crops a document into sections based on the page layout. OCR is then performed on each section individually using variable character confidence level thresholds to maximize page-level OCR accuracy. A patent from the United States Patent Office has been issued for this method.

The OCR result can be stored in the standardized ALTO format, a dedicated XML schema maintained by the United States Library of Congress. Other common formats include hOCR and PAGE XML.

For a list of optical character recognition software, see Comparison of optical character recognition software.

=== Post-processing ===
OCR accuracy can be increased if the output is constrained by a lexicon – a list of words that are allowed to occur in a document. This might be, for example, all the words in the English language, or a more technical lexicon for a specific field. This technique can be problematic if the document contains words not in the lexicon, like proper nouns. Tesseract uses its dictionary to influence the character segmentation step, for improved accuracy.

The output stream may be a plain text stream or file of characters, but more sophisticated OCR systems can preserve the original layout of the page and produce, for example, an annotated PDF that includes both the original image of the page and a searchable textual representation.

Near-neighbor analysis can make use of co-occurrence frequencies to correct errors, by noting that certain words are often seen together. For example, "Washington, D.C." is generally far more common in English than "Washington DOC".

Knowledge of the grammar of the language being scanned can also help determine if a word is likely to be a verb or a noun, for example, allowing greater accuracy.

The Levenshtein Distance algorithm has also been used in OCR post-processing to further optimize results from an OCR API.

=== Application-specific optimizations ===
In recent years, the major OCR technology providers began to tweak OCR systems to deal more efficiently with specific types of input. Beyond an application-specific lexicon, better performance may be had by taking into account business rules, standard expression, or rich information contained in color images. This strategy is called "Application-Oriented OCR" or "Customized OCR", and has been applied to OCR of license plates, invoices, screenshots, ID cards, driver's licenses, and automobile manufacturing.

The New York Times has adapted the OCR technology into a proprietary tool they entitle Document Helper, that enables their interactive news team to accelerate the processing of documents that need to be reviewed. They note that it enables them to process what amounts to as many as 5,400 pages per hour in preparation for reporters to review the contents.

== Workarounds ==
There are several techniques for solving the problem of character recognition by means other than improved OCR algorithms.

=== Forcing better input ===
Special fonts like OCR-A, OCR-B, or MICR fonts, with precisely specified sizing, spacing, and distinctive character shapes, allow a higher accuracy rate during transcription in bank check processing. Several prominent OCR engines were designed to capture text in popular fonts such as Arial or Times New Roman, and are incapable of capturing text in these fonts that are specialized and very different from popularly used fonts. As Google Tesseract can be trained to recognize new fonts, it can recognize OCR-A, OCR-B and MICR fonts.

Soviet Postal Codes

Comb fields are pre-printed boxes that encourage humans to write more legibly – one glyph per box. These are often printed in a dropout color which can be easily removed by the OCR system. This technique was used in the former Soviet Union which had numeric postal codes and standardized boxes at the bottom of all envelopes where the user printed out the digits by connecting the dots.

Palm OS used a special set of glyphs, known as Graffiti, which are similar to printed English characters but simplified or modified for easier recognition on the platform's computationally limited hardware. Users would need to learn how to write these special glyphs.

Zone-based OCR restricts the image to a specific part of a document. This is often referred to as Template OCR.

=== Crowdsourcing ===
Crowdsourcing humans to perform the character recognition can quickly process images like computer-driven OCR, but with higher accuracy for recognizing images than that obtained via computers. Practical systems include the Amazon Mechanical Turk and reCAPTCHA. The National Library of Finland has developed an online interface for users to correct OCRed texts in the standardized ALTO format. Crowd sourcing has also been used not to perform character recognition directly but to invite software developers to develop image processing algorithms, for example, through the use of rank-order tournaments.

== Accuracy ==
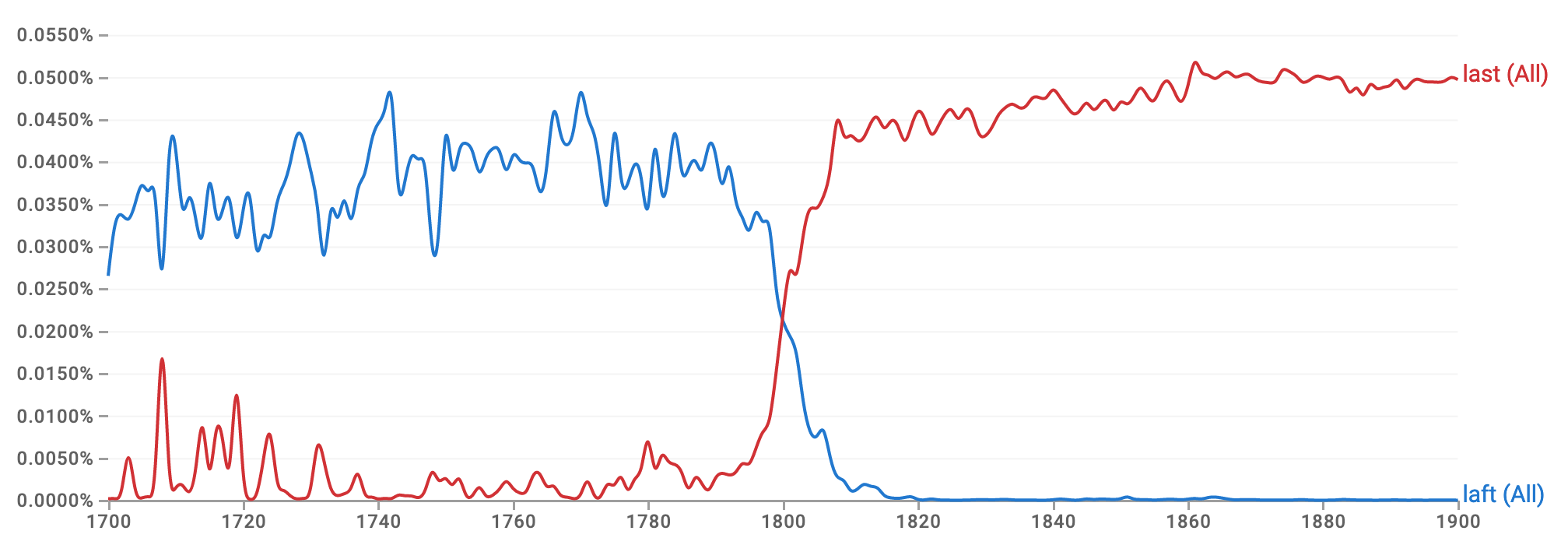
Occurrence of laft and last in Google's n-grams database, in English documents from 1700 to 1900, based on OCR scans for the "English 2009" corpus

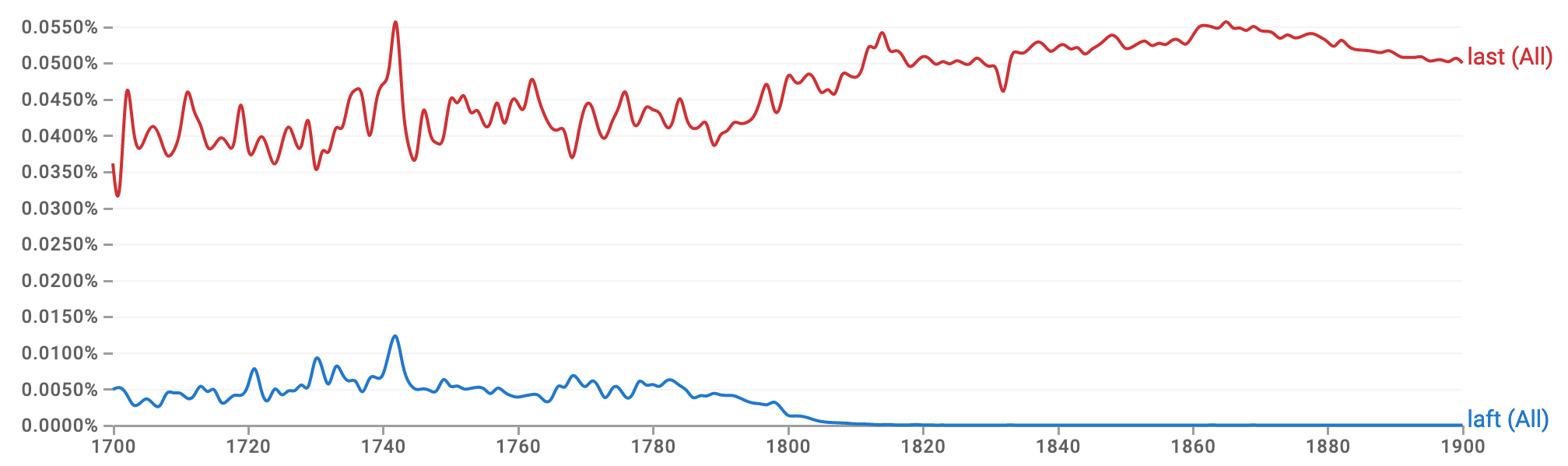
Occurrence of laft and last in Google's n-grams database, based on OCR scans for the "English 2012" corpus

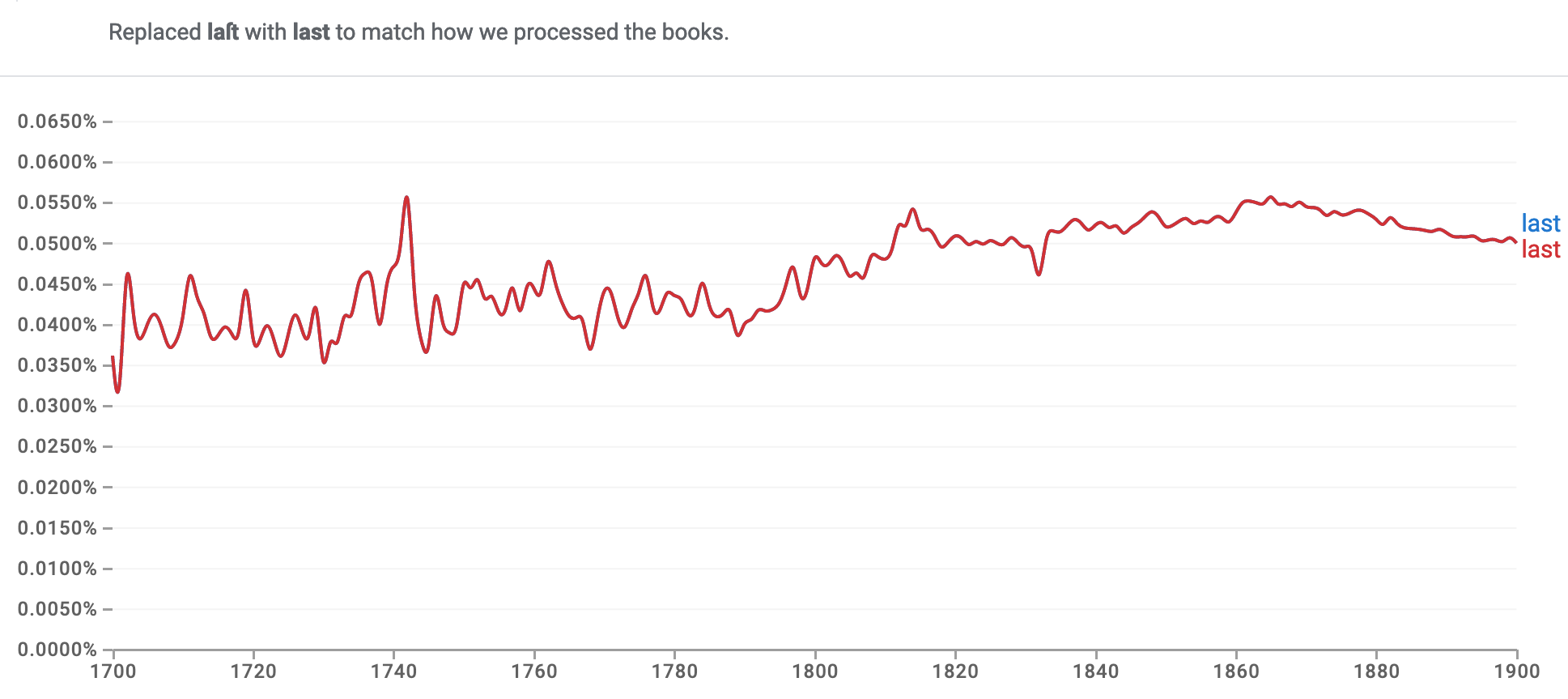
Searching for words with a long S in English 2012 or later are normalized to an S.

Commissioned by the U.S. Department of Energy (DOE), the Information Science Research Institute (ISRI) had the mission to foster the improvement of automated technologies for understanding machine printed documents, and it conducted the most authoritative of the Annual Test of OCR Accuracy from 1992 to 1996.

Recognition of typewritten, Latin script text is still not 100% accurate even where clear imaging is available. One study based on recognition of 19th- and early 20th-century newspaper pages concluded that character-by-character OCR accuracy for commercial OCR software varied from 81% to 99%; total accuracy can be achieved by human review or Data Dictionary Authentication. Other areas – including recognition of hand printing, cursive handwriting, and printed text in other scripts (especially those East Asian language characters which have many strokes for a single character) – are still the subject of active research. The MNIST database is commonly used for testing systems' ability to recognize handwritten digits.

Accuracy rates can be measured in several ways, and how they are measured can greatly affect the reported accuracy rate. For example, if word context (a lexicon of words) is not used to correct software finding non-existent words, a character error rate of 1% (99% accuracy) may result in an error rate of 5% or worse if the measurement is based on whether each whole word was recognized with no incorrect letters. Using a large enough dataset is important in a neural-network-based handwriting recognition solutions. On the other hand, producing natural datasets is very complicated and time-consuming.

An example of the difficulties inherent in digitizing old text is the inability of OCR to differentiate between the "long s" and "f" characters.

Recognition of cursive text has recognition rates even lower than that of hand-printed text. Higher rates of recognition of general cursive script will likely not be possible without the use of contextual or grammatical information. For example, recognizing entire words from a dictionary is easier than trying to parse individual characters from script. Reading the Amount line of a check (which is always a written-out number) is an example where using a smaller dictionary can increase recognition rates greatly. The shapes of individual cursive characters themselves simply do not contain enough information to accurately (greater than 98%) recognize all handwritten cursive script.

Most programs allow users to set "confidence rates". This means that if the software does not achieve their desired level of accuracy, a user can be notified for manual review.

An error introduced by OCR scanning is sometimes termed a scanno (by analogy with the term typo).

== Unicode ==
Characters to support OCR were added to the Unicode Standard in June 1993, with the release of version 1.1.

Some of these characters are mapped from fonts specific to MICR, OCR-A or OCR-B.

Optical Character Recognition^{[1]}^{[2]} Official Unicode Consortium code chart (PDF)
	0	1	2	3	4	5	6	7	8	9	A	B	C	D	E	F
U+244x	⑀	⑁	⑂	⑃	⑄	⑅	⑆	⑇	⑈	⑉	⑊					
U+245x																
Notes 1.As of Unicode version 18.0 2.Grey areas indicate non-assigned code points

== See also ==
- Applications of artificial intelligence
- Comparison of optical character recognition software
- Computational linguistics
- Digital library
- Digital mailroom
- Digital pen
- eScriptorium
- Institutional repository
- Legibility
- Live ink character recognition solution
- Magnetic ink character recognition
- Music OCR
- OCR in Indian languages
- Optical mark recognition
- Sketch recognition
- Speech recognition
- Tesseract OCR engine
