= Dog tag =

Identification tag worn by military personnel

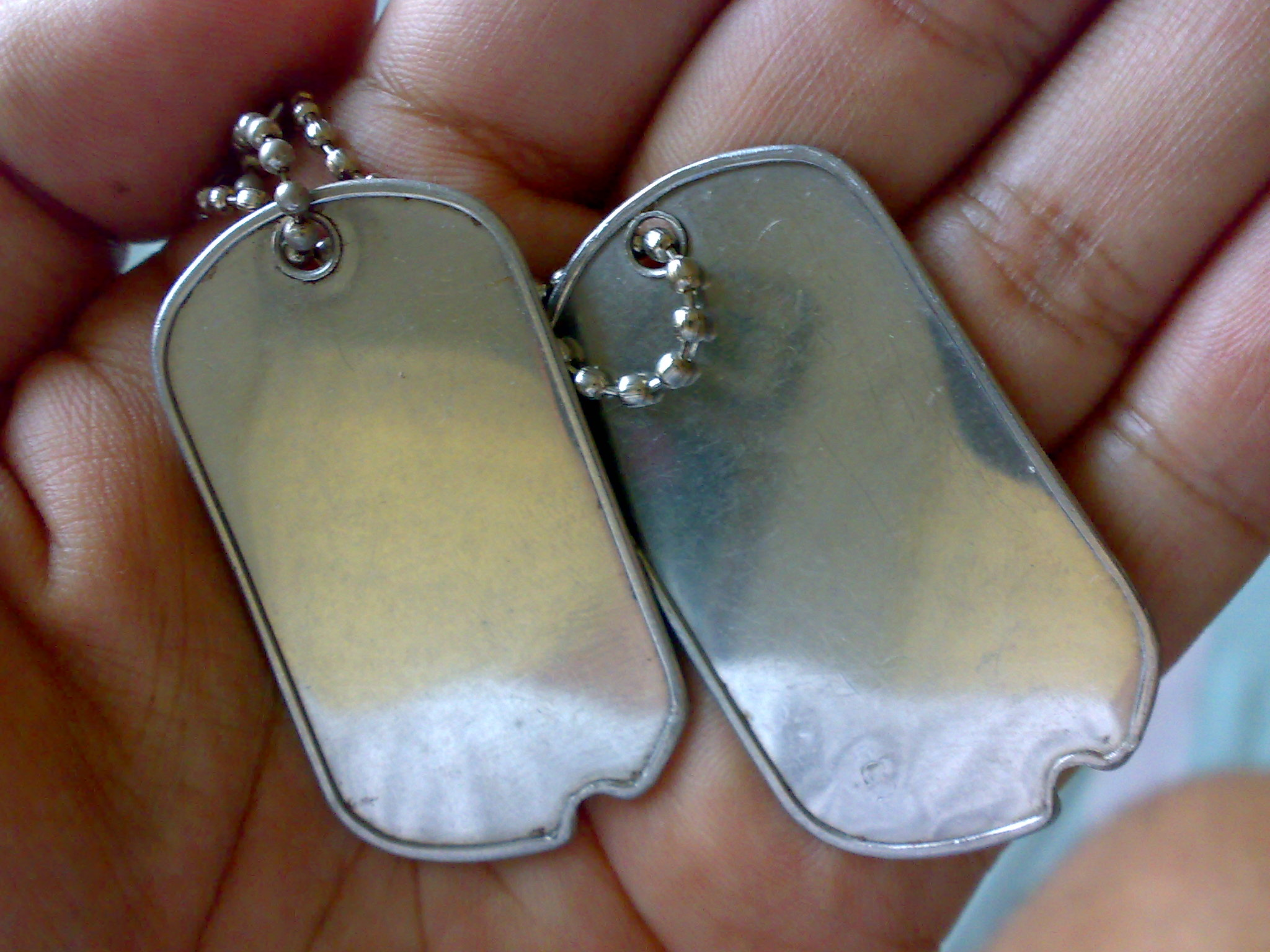
A pair of blank dog tags on one ball chain.

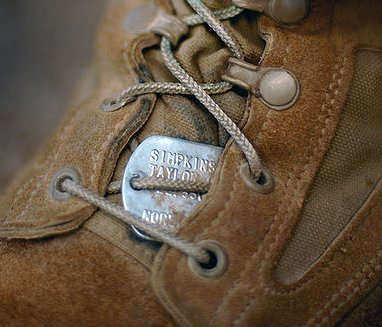
Dog tag placed in bootlace.

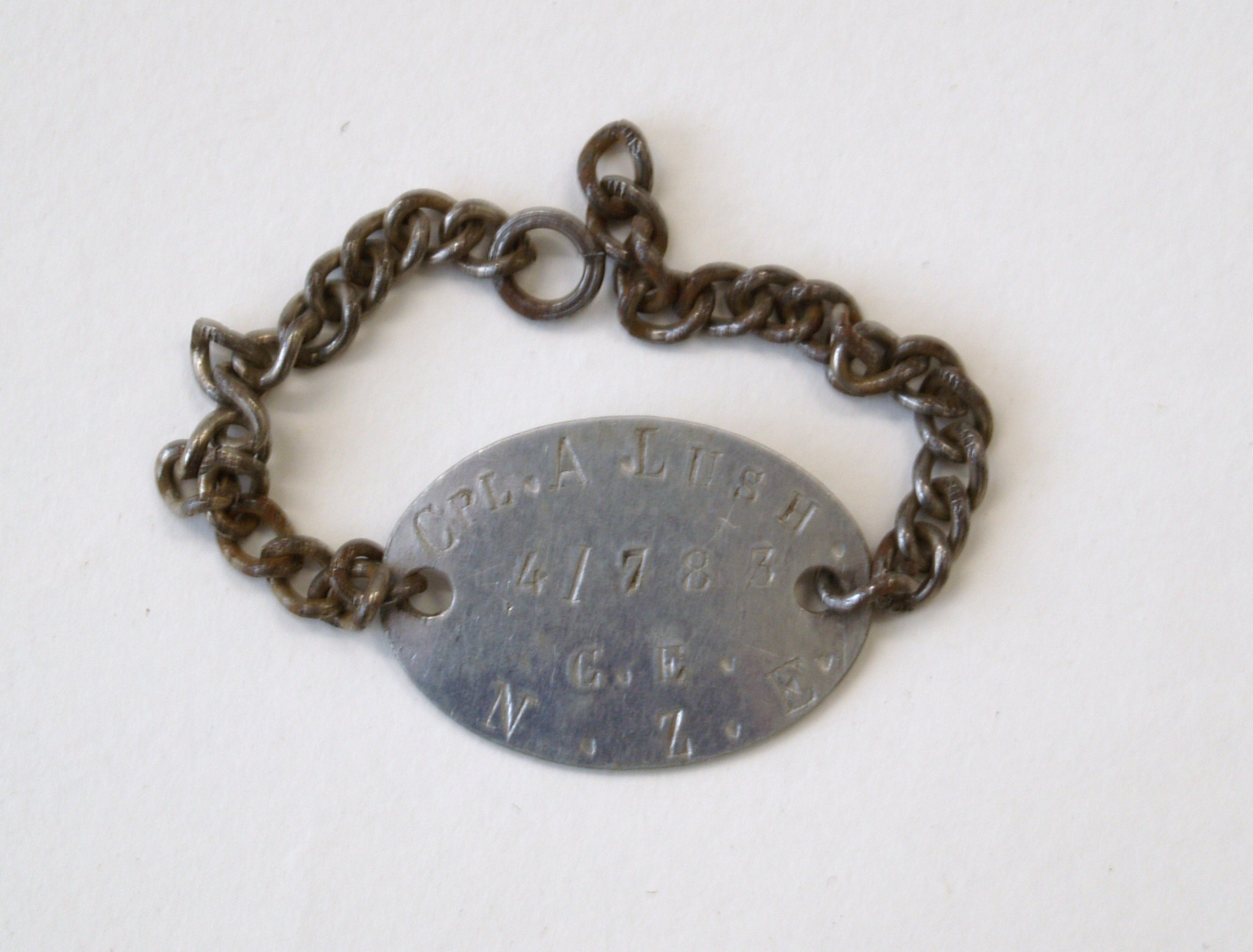
New Zealand Army wristband dog tag.

Military identification tag, also informally known as dog tag, is a common term for a specific type of identification tag worn by military personnel. The tag is generally worn around the neck or attached or embedded into articles of clothing. The tags' primary use is for the identification of casualties; they have information about the individual written on them, including identification and essential basic medical information such as blood type and history of inoculations. They may indicate a religious preference as well. The term most likely originates from newspaper publisher William Randolph Hearst in 1936. He used it in an article written to criticize Franklin D. Roosevelt's proposed New Deal which allegedly included worker identification tags. Hearst referred to them as "dog tags", comparing them to those worn in the military. Another proposed origin is from WWII draftees who referred to them as dog tags, either because of their poor treatment, or because of their resemblance to animal identification tags.

== History ==
The earliest mention of an identification tag for soldiers comes in Polyaenus (Stratagems 1.17) where the Spartans wrote their names on sticks tied to their left wrists. A type of dog tag ("signaculum") was given to the Roman legionary at the moment of enrollment. The legionary "signaculum" was a lead disk with a leather string, worn around the neck, with the name of the recruit and the indication of the legion of which the recruit was part. This procedure, together with enrollment in the list of recruits, was made at the beginning of a four-month probatory period (Latin: probatio). The recruit obtained the military status only after the oath of allegiance (Latin: signaculum) at the end of "probatio", meaning that from a legal point of view the "signaculum" was given to a subject who was no longer a civilian, but not yet in the military.

In more recent times, dog tags were provided to Chinese soldiers as early as the mid-19th century. During the Taiping revolt (1851–66), both the Imperialists (i.e., the Chinese Imperial Army regular servicemen) and those Taiping rebels wearing a uniform wore wooden dog tags at the belt, bearing the soldier's name, age, birthplace, unit, and date of enlistment.

=== American Civil War ===
During the American Civil War from 1861 to 1865, some soldiers pinned paper notes with their name and home address to the backs of their coats. Other soldiers stenciled identification on their knapsacks or scratched it in the soft lead backing of their army belt buckles.

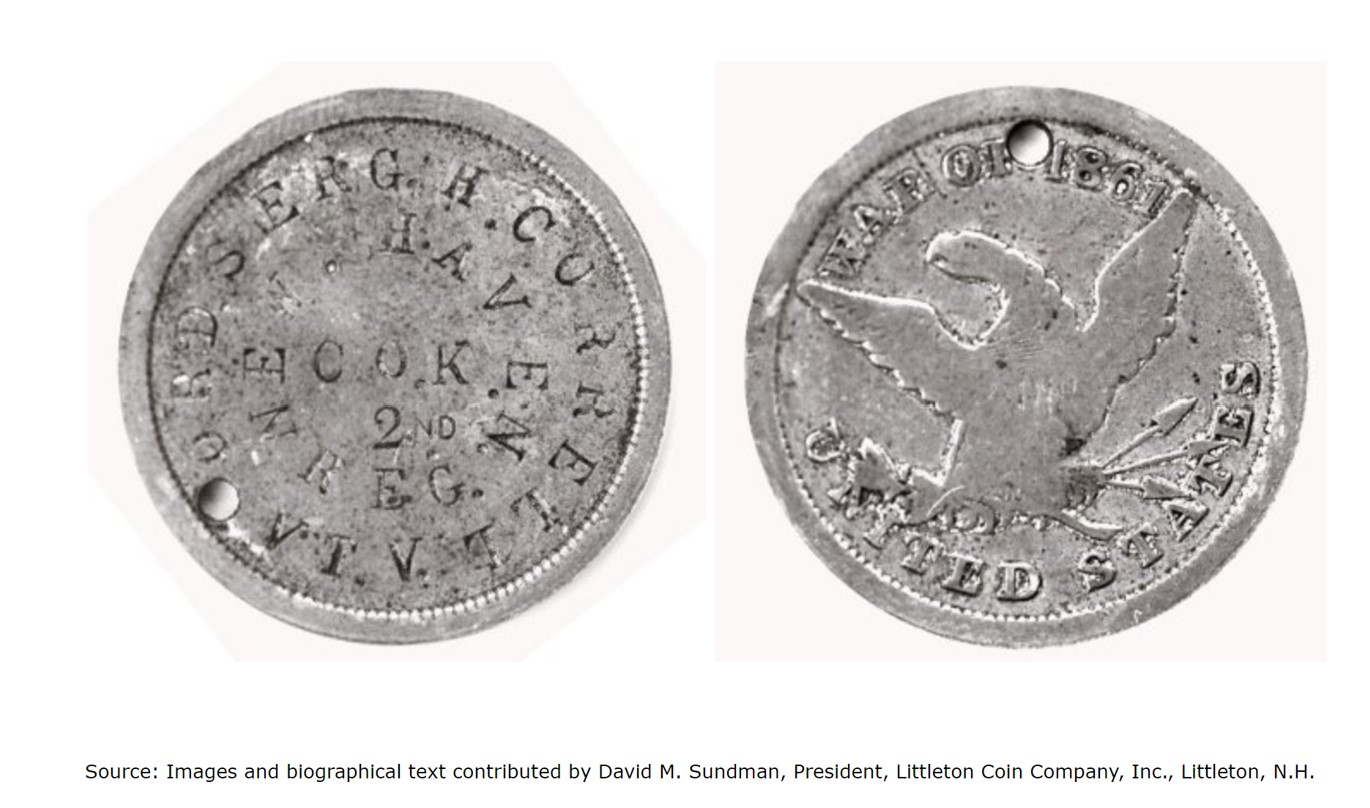
ID tags for Lt. Henry Correll of the 2nd Vermont Volunteer Infantry

Manufacturers of identification badges recognized a market and began advertising in periodicals. Their pins were usually shaped to suggest a branch of service, and engraved with the soldier's name and unit.

Machine-stamped tags were also made of brass or lead with a hole and usually had (on one side) an eagle or shield, and such phrases as "War for the Union" or "Liberty, Union, and Equality". The other side had the soldier's name and unit, and sometimes a list of battles in which he had participated.

=== Franco-Prussian War ===
On a volunteer basis Prussian soldiers had decided to wear identification tags in the Austro-Prussian War of 1866. However, many rejected dog tags as a bad omen for their lives. So until eight months after the Battle of Königgrätz, with almost 8,900 Prussian casualties, only 429 of them could be identified.

With the formation of the North German Confederation in 1867 Prussian, military regulations became binding for the militaries of all North German member states via the Instruction on the Medical Corps Organisation of the Army Afield (German: Instruktion über das Sanitätswesen der Armee im Felde) issued on 29 April 1869. Identification tags (German: Erkennungsmarke, lit. 'Recognition mark') were to be handed out to each soldier before deployment afield.

The Prussian Army issued identification tags for its troops at the beginning of the Franco-Prussian War in 1870. They were nicknamed Hundemarken (lit. 'Dog mark') and compared to a similar identification system instituted by the dog licence fee, adding tags to collars of those dogs whose owners paid the fee, in the Prussian capital city of Berlin at around the same time period.

=== World War I ===
The British Army introduced identity discs in place of identity cards in 1907, in the form of aluminium discs, typically made at regimental depots using machines similar to those common at fun fairs, the details being embossed into the thin metal one letter at a time.

Army Order 287 of September 1916 required the British Army provide all soldiers with two official tags, both made of vulcanised asbestos fibre due to an aluminium shortage caused by the World War I. These tags carried identical details, again impressed one character at a time.

The first tag, an octagonal green disc, was attached to a long cord around the neck. The second tag, a circular red disc, was threaded on a 6-inch cord suspended from the first tag. The first tag was intended to remain on the body for future identification, while the second tag could be taken to record the death.

British and Empire/Commonwealth forces (Australia, Canada, and New Zealand) were issued essentially identical identification discs of basic pattern during the Great War, Second World War and Korea, though official identity discs were frequently supplemented by private-purchase items such as identity bracelets, particularly favoured by sailors who believed the official discs were unlikely to survive long immersion in water.

The U.S. Army first authorized identification tags in War Department General Order No. 204, dated December 20, 1906, which essentially prescribes the Kennedy identification tag:

An aluminum identification tag, the size of a silver half dollar and of suitable thickness, stamped with the name, rank, company, regiment, or corps of the wearer, will be worn by each officer and enlisted man of the Army whenever the field kit is worn, the tag to be suspended from the neck, underneath the clothing, by a cord or thong passed through a small hole in the tag. It is prescribed as a part of the uniform and when not worn as directed herein will be habitually kept in the possession of the owner. The tag will be issued by the Quartermaster's Department gratuitously to enlisted men and at cost price to officers.

The U.S. Army changed regulations on July 6, 1916, so that all soldiers were issued two tags: one to stay with the body and the other to go to the person in charge of the burial for record-keeping purposes. In 1918, the U.S. Army adopted and allotted the service number system, and name and service numbers were ordered stamped on the identification tags.

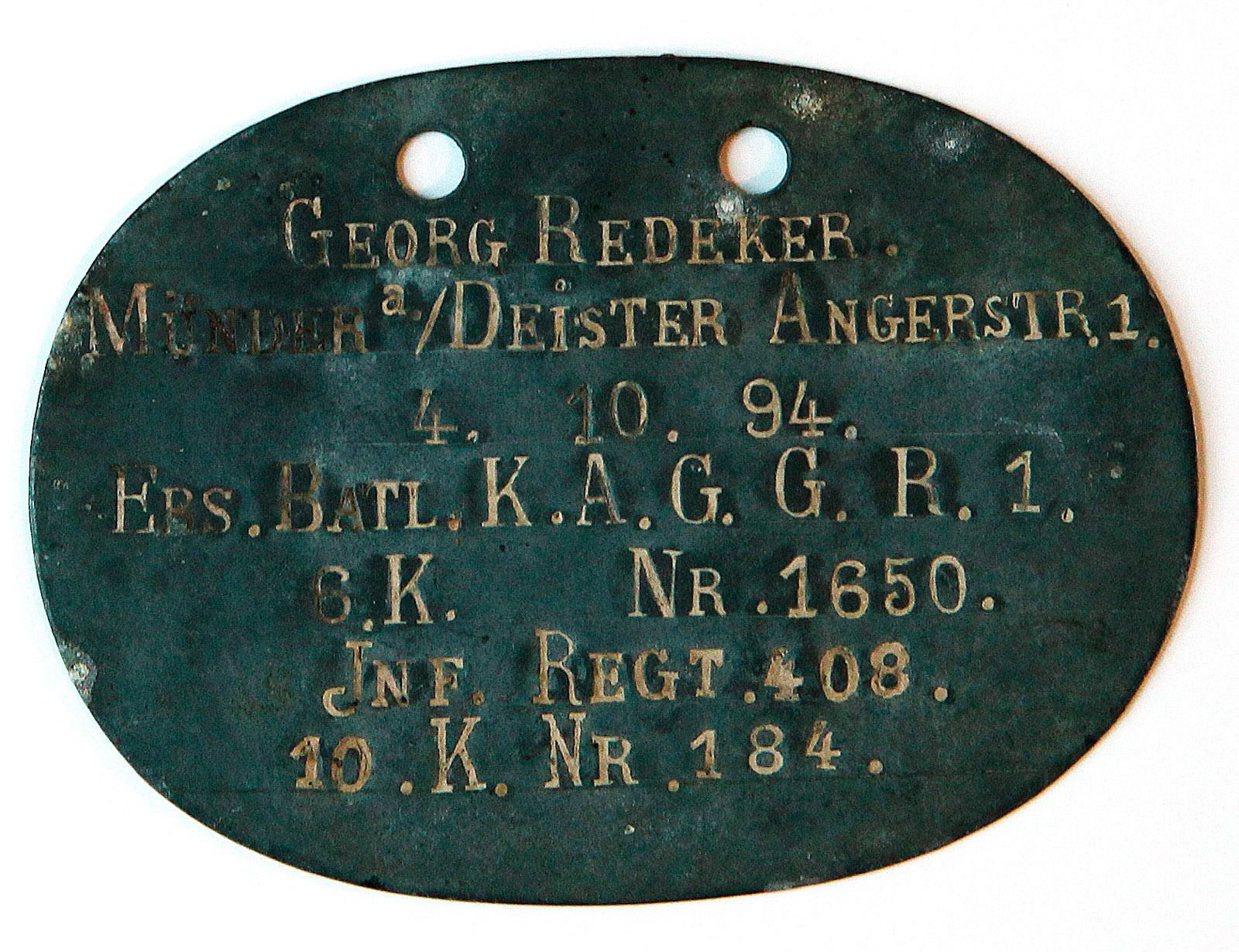
A World War I German army dog tag indicating name, place of birth, battalion, unit and serial number

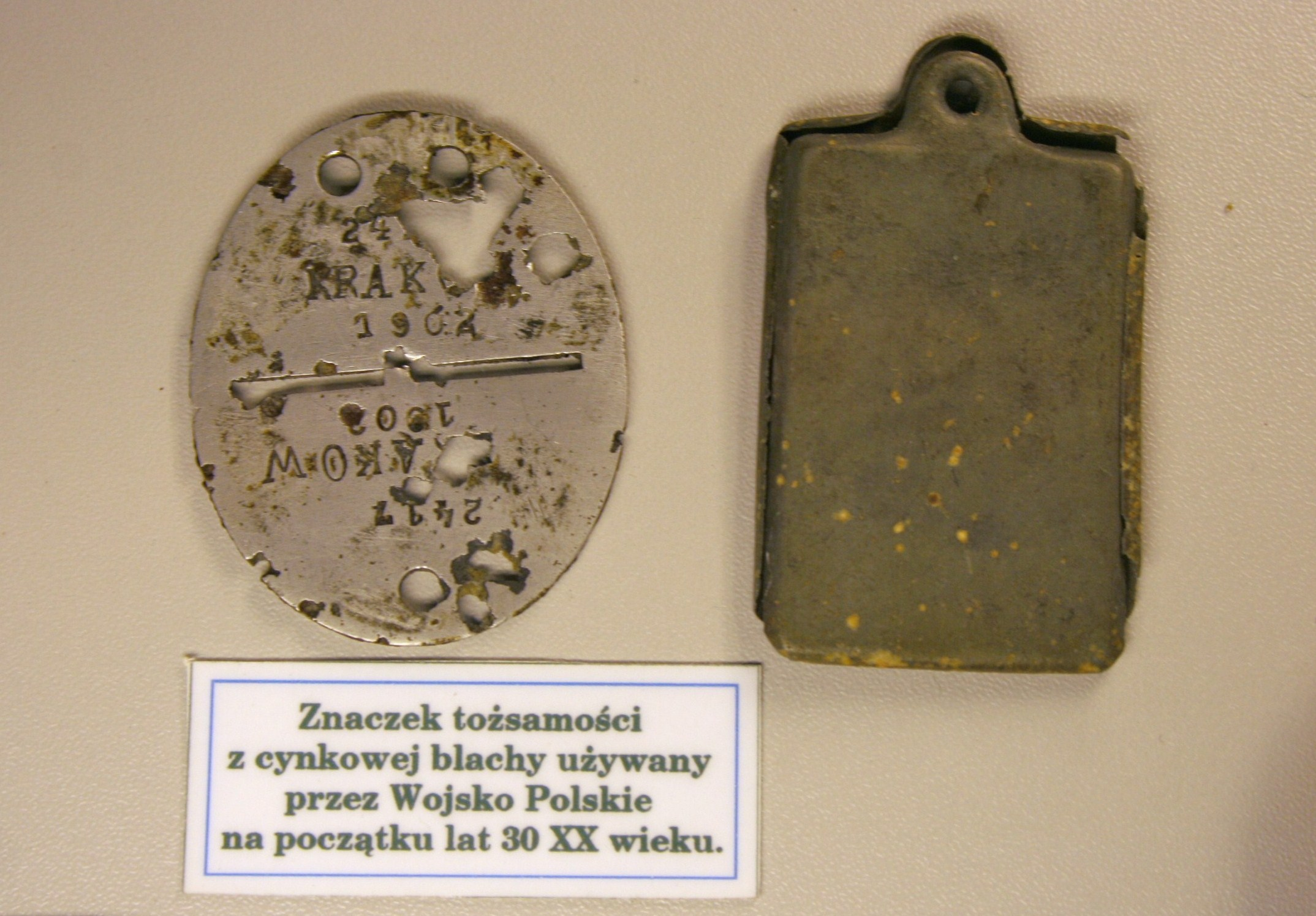
Polish dog tags from the 1920s (right) and 1930s (left)

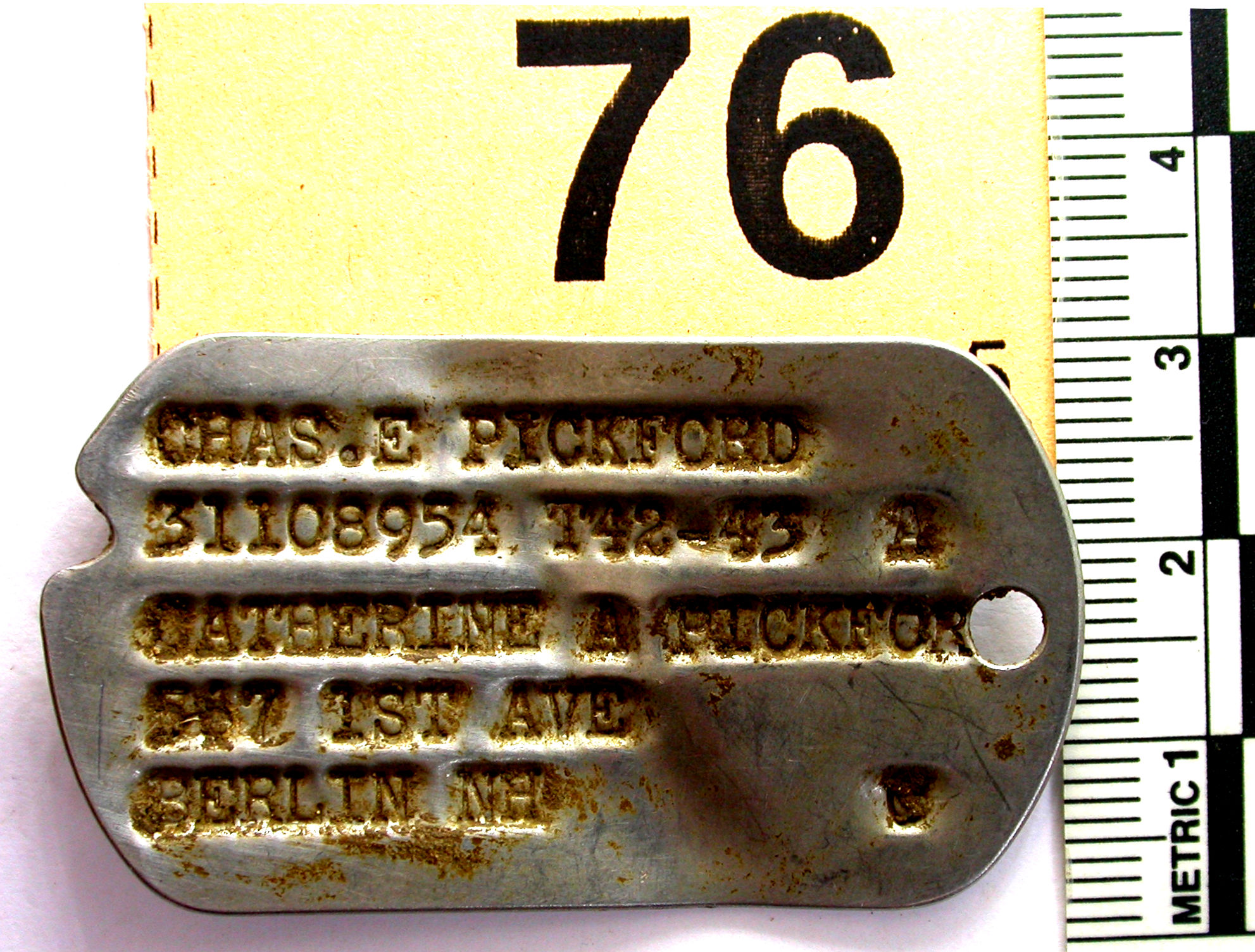
World War II-era U.S. Army dog tag (1943 or later); it shows name, service number (beginning with '3', indicating a conscript), tetanus vaccination information, blood group (A), name and address of next of kin, and religion ('C' for Catholic).

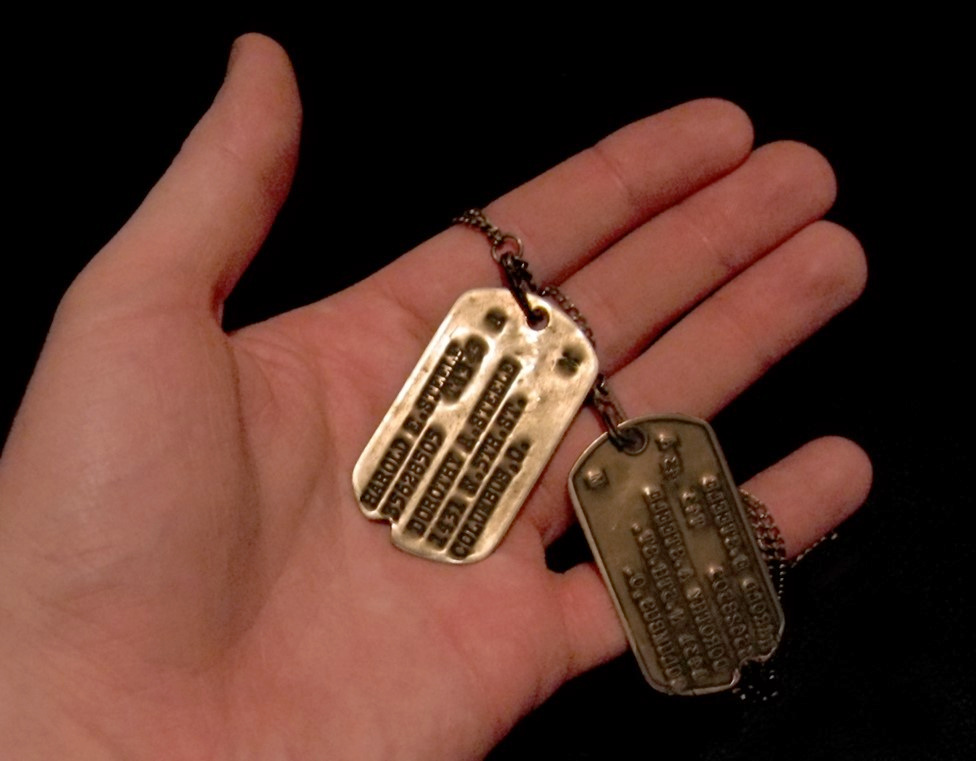
U.S. Army dog tags from World War II

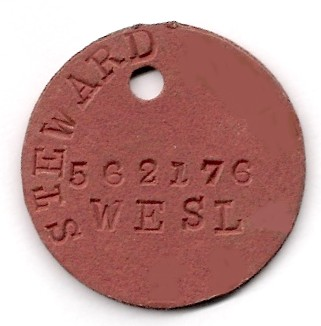
One of the two compressed asbestos identity discs issued by the South African Navy during World War II with rank, surname, initials, force number and religious affiliation

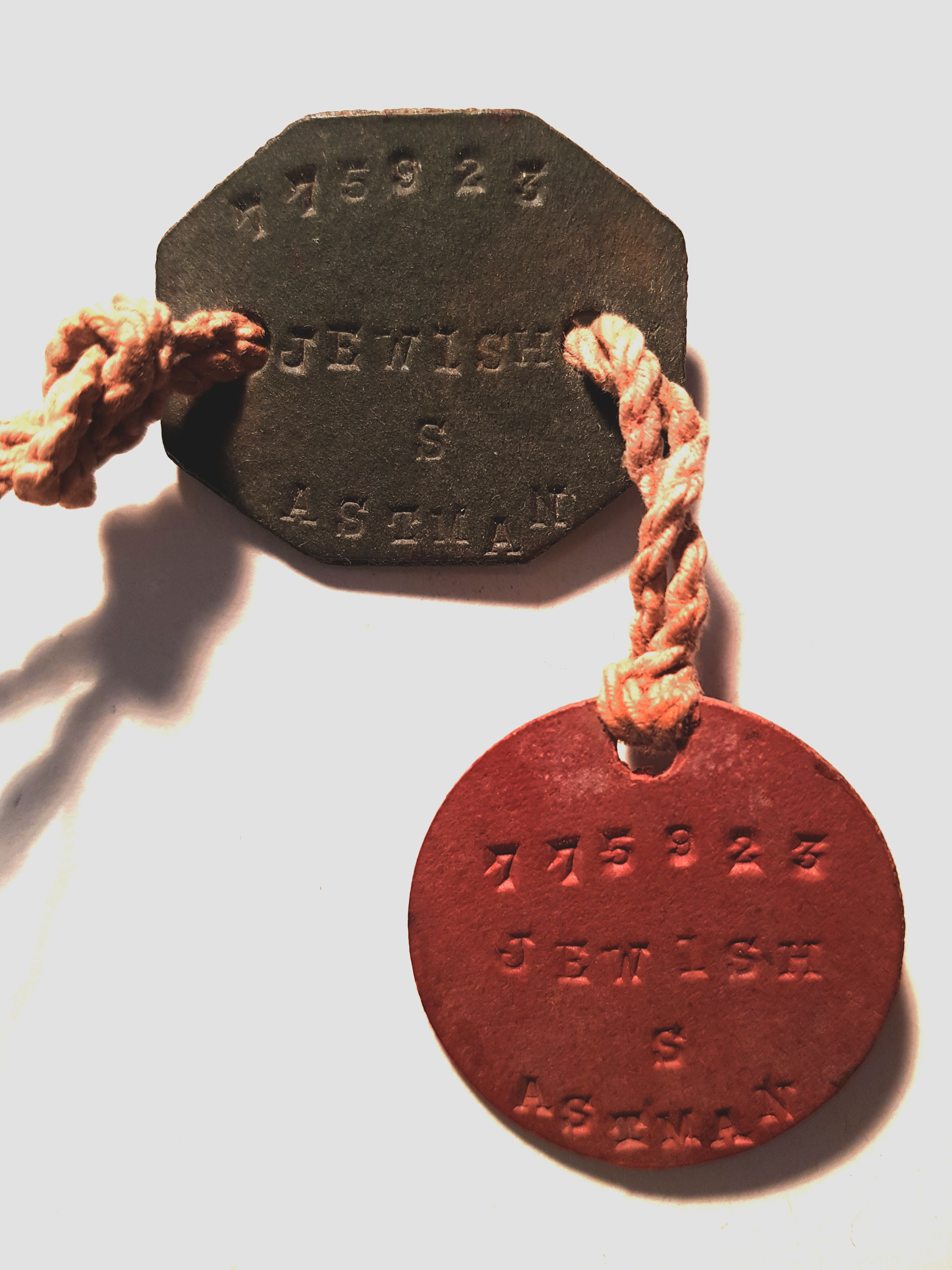
British WWII RAF Dog tag of the Jewish soldier Astman, identification number 775923. Both tags were made from compressed asbestos, the red fireproof and the grey rot proof.

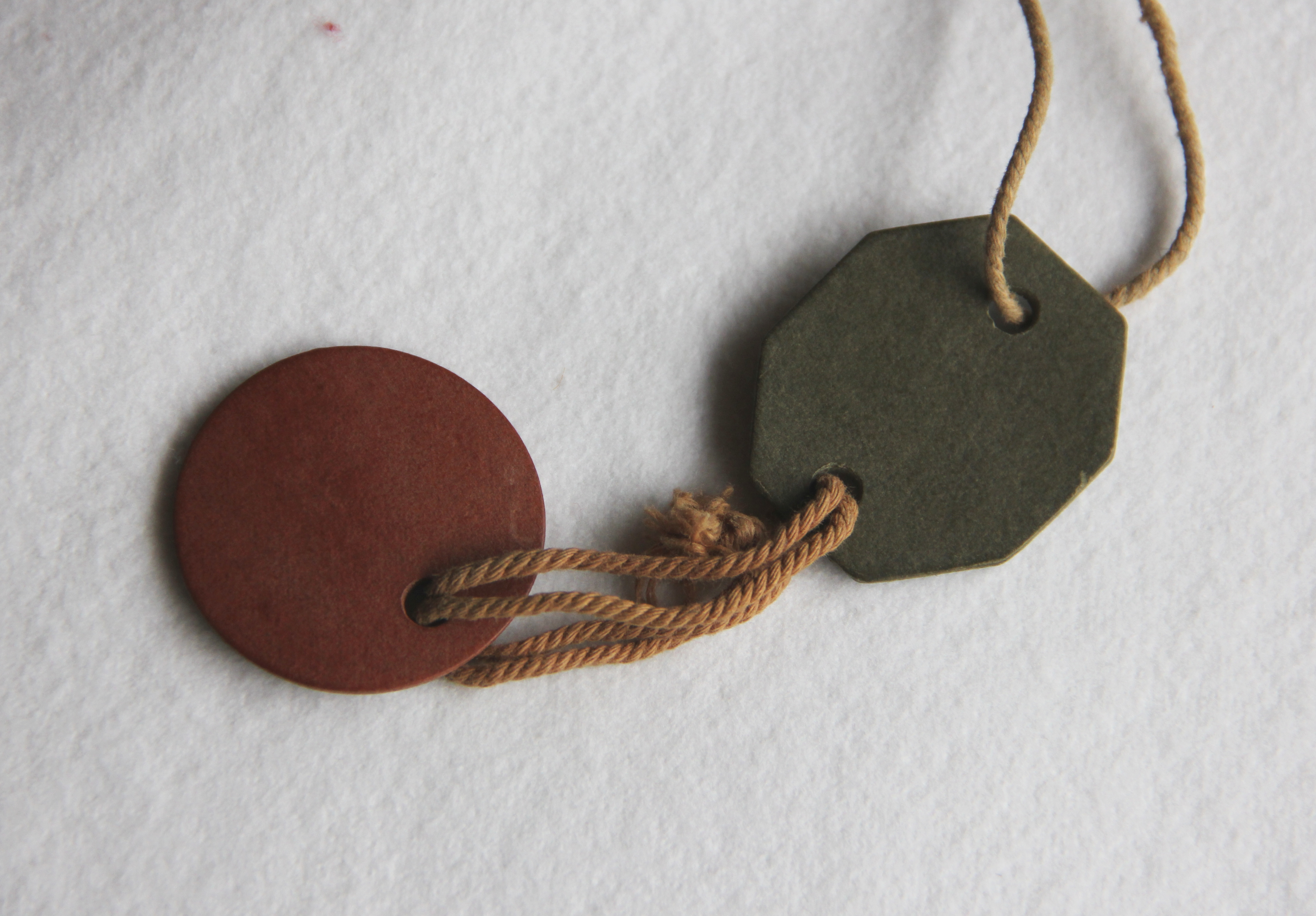
British World War II fibre-disc-type dog tag

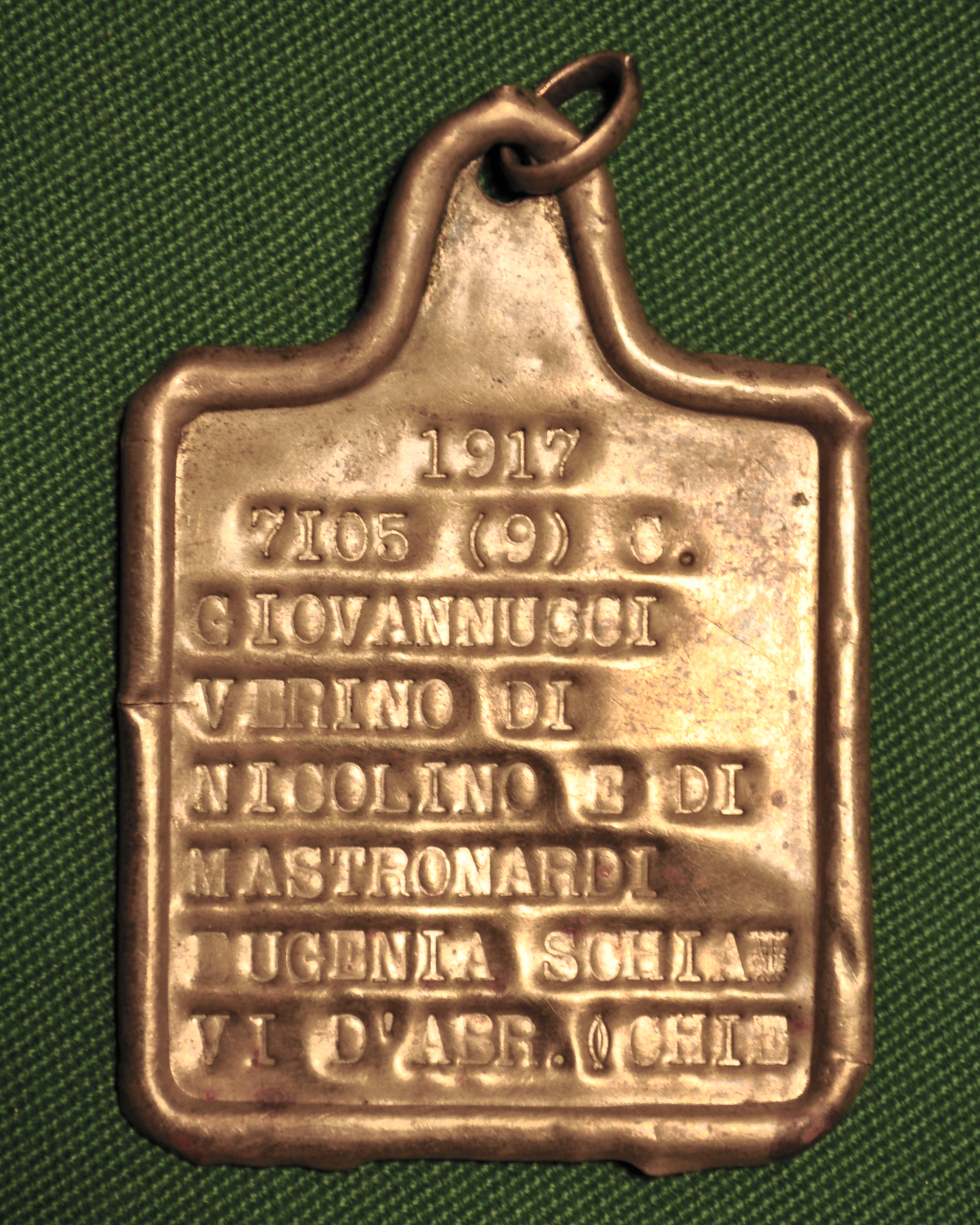
Military dog tag, Italy World War II

Dog tags of Polish Army officers, victims of the Katyn massacre, excavated in the mass graves in Kharkiv

== Production ==
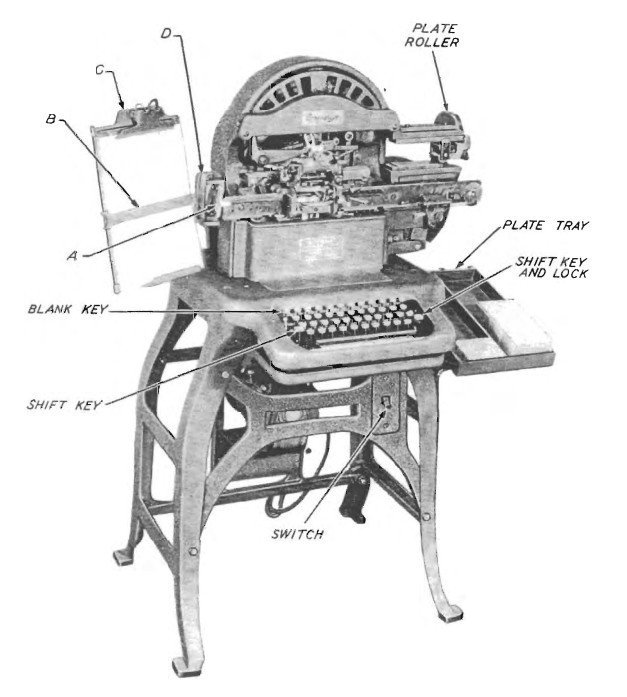
Dog tag Graphotype Class 6380.

Dog tags are usually fabricated from a corrosion-resistant metal.

There is a recurring myth about the notch situated in one end of the dog tags issued to United States Army personnel during World War II, and up until the Korean War era. It was rumored that the notch's purpose was that, if a soldier found one of his comrades on the battlefield, he could take one tag to the commanding officer and stick the other between the teeth of the soldier to ensure that the tag would remain with the body and be identified.

In reality, the notch was used with the Model 70 Addressograph Hand Identification Imprinting Machine (a pistol-type imprinter used primarily by the Medical Department during World War II). American dogtags of the 1930s through 1980s were produced using a Graphotype machine, in which characters are debossed into metal plates. Some tags are still debossed, using earlier equipment, and some are embossed (with raised letters) on computer-controlled equipment.

It appears instructions that would confirm the notch's mythical use were issued at least unofficially by the Graves Registration Service during the Vietnam War to Army troops headed overseas.

== Usage ==
=== Military ===
Dog tags commonly contain two copies of the information, either in the form of a single tag that can be broken in half, or as two identical tags on the same chain.

This purposeful duplication allows one tag, or half-tag, to be collected from an individual's dead body for notification, while the duplicate remains with the corpse if the conditions of battle prevent it from being immediately recovered.

Although typically worn around the neck, dog tags have been worn on boot laces and wristbands. Dog tags are traditionally part of the makeshift battlefield memorials soldiers created for their fallen comrades. The casualty's rifle with bayonet affixed is stood vertically atop the empty boots, with the helmet over the rifle's stock. The dog tags hang from the rifle's handle or trigger guard.

=== Non-military ===
Some tags (along with similar items such as MedicAlert bracelets) are used also by civilians to identify their wearers and:

- specify them as having health problems that may suddenly incapacitate their wearers and render them incapable of providing treatment guidance (as in the cases of heart problems, epilepsy, diabetic coma, accident or major trauma)
- specify them as having health problems that may interact adversely with medical treatments, especially standard or "first-line" ones (as in the case of an allergy to common medications)
- provide in case of emergency ("ICE") contact information
- state a religious, moral, or other objection to artificial resuscitation, if a first responder attempts to administer such treatment when the wearer is non-responsive and thus unable to warn against doing so. A DNR signed by a physician is still required in some states.

Military personnel in some jurisdictions may wear a supplementary medical information tag.

== Variations by country ==
=== Austria ===
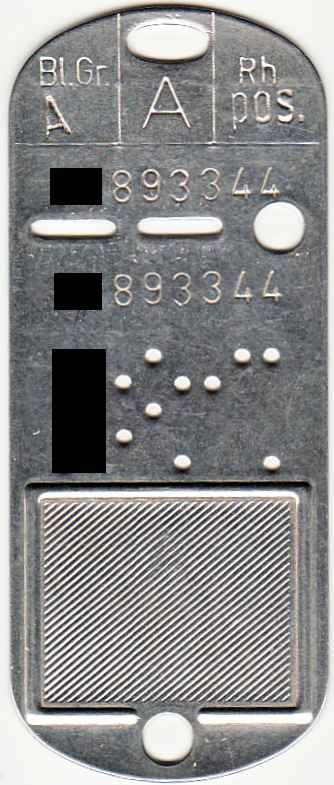
An Austrian dog tag.

The Austrian Bundesheer used a single long, rectangular tag, with oval ends, stamped with blood group and Rh factor at the end, with ID number underneath. Two slots and a hole stamped beneath allows the tag to be broken in halves, and the long bottom portion has both the ID number and a series of holes which allows the tag to be inserted into a dosimeter. This has been replaced with a more conventional, wider and rounded rectangle which can still be halved, but lacks the dosimeter reading holes.

=== Australia ===
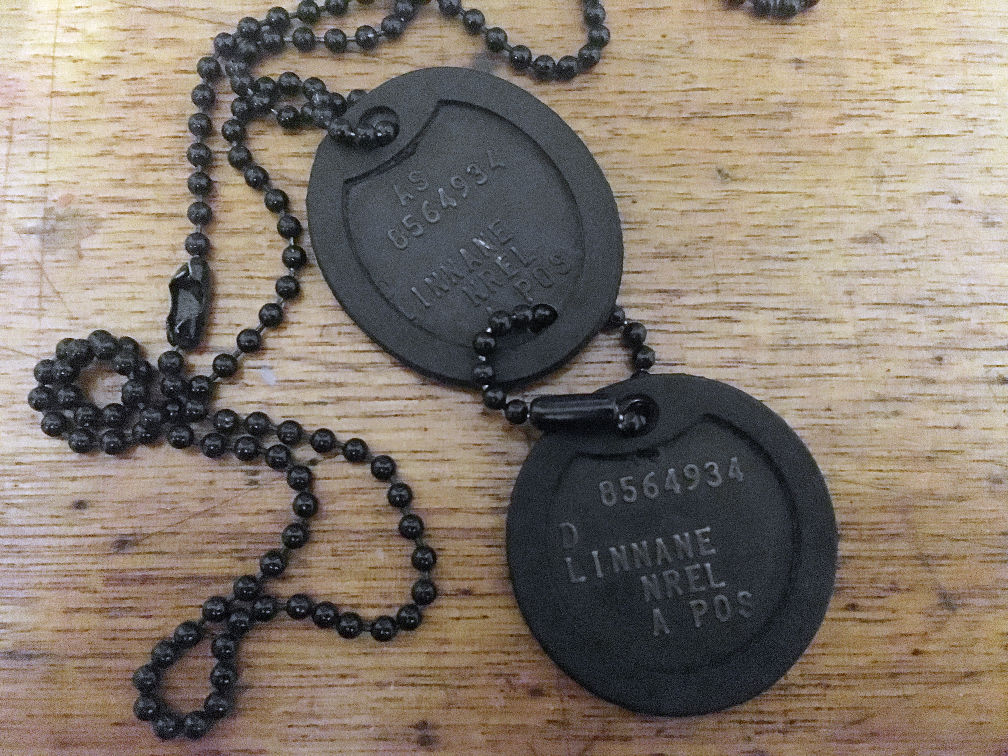
Australian dog tags, fitted with rubber dog tag silencers. Note the lower circular tag attached to the upper tag.

The Australian Defence Force issues soldiers two tags of different shapes, one octagonal and one circular, containing the following information:

- AS (denoting Australia, previously both AU and AUST have been used)
- PMKeyS/Service number
- First initial
- Last name
- Religious abbreviation (e.g. RC – Roman Catholic, NREL – No religion)
- Blood group

The information is printed exactly the same on both discs. In the event of a casualty, the circular tag is removed from the body.

=== Belgium ===
Belgian Forces identity tags are, like their Canadian and Norwegian contemporaries, designed to be broken in two in the case of a fatality; the lower half is returned to the Belgian Defence Staff, while the upper half remains on the body. The tags contain the following information, with slight variation depending on the linguistic region of the soldier:

- Upper half:
  - Belgisch Leger/Armee Belge (Belgian Army) and Date of Birth in DD/MM/YYYY format.
  - Surname with the addition of the first letter of given name.
  - Service number and blood group with RH factor and optionally religion.
- Lower half: identical.
- Example:
  - Belgisch Leger 01/01/1991
  - Surname J
  - 1234567 O+ KATH

=== Canada ===
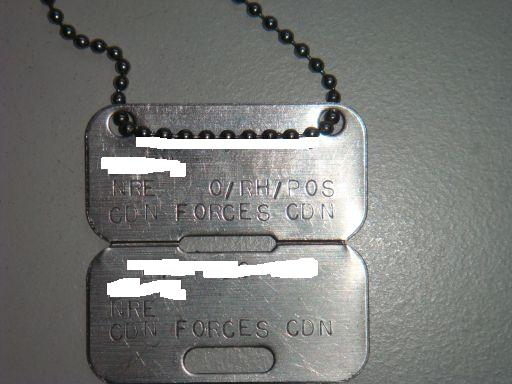
Canadian Forces ID Disk. Name and service number are redacted.

Canadian Armed Forces identity discs (abbreviated "ID discs") are designed to be broken in two in the case of fatality; the lower half is returned to National Defence Headquarters with the member's personal documents, while the upper half remains on the body. The tags contain the following information:

- Upper half:
  - Service Number (SN)
  - Initials and surname
  - Religion (or "NRE" if none) and blood group with RH factor
  - The legend "CDN FORCES CDN" (or for foreign nationals, the name of the country the individual represents)
  - The text "DO NOT REMOVE / NE PAS ENLEVER" on the reverse
- Lower half: identical, except that the reverse is blank.

Before the Service Number was introduced in the 1990s, military personnel were identified on the ID discs (as well as other documents) by their social insurance number.

=== China ===
The People's Liberation Army have been issuing two long, rectangular tags (Chinese: 军人保障标识牌) for their personnel. All information is stamped in Simplified Chinese:

- Full name
- Gender
- Date of birth
- RIC number
- PLA's ID number
- Blood type
- Branch

PLA is introducing a two-dimensional matrix code on the second tag, the matrix code contains a link to the official database. This allows the inquirer get more details about the military personnel and provide them resources in the battlefield.

=== Colombia ===
The Ejército Nacional de Colombia uses long, rectangular metal tags with oval ends tags stamped with the following information:

- Family Name
- First Name
- Military ID Number
- Blood Type
- Branch of Service

Duplicate tags are issued. Often, tags are issued with a prayer inscribed on the reverse.

=== Cyprus ===
In Cyprus, identification tags include the following information:

- Surname
- First name
- Service number (E.g., 11111/00/00B, where the first five digits are the ID, the second two are the year the soldier turned 18 years old, the last two digits are the year the soldier enlisted, and the letter is the enlistment group, either A or B)
- Blood Group

=== Denmark ===
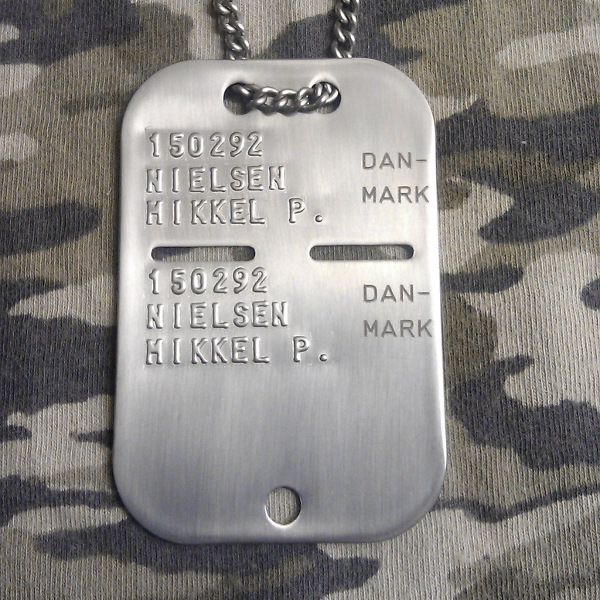
Danish military dog tag

The military of Denmark use dog tags made from small, rectangular metal plates. The tag is designed to be broken into two pieces each with the following information stamped onto it:

- Personal identification number
- Surname
- First name

Additionally, the right hand side of each half-tag is engraved DANMARK (lit. 'Denmark'). Starting in 1985, the individual's service number (which is the same as their social security number) is included on the tag. In case the individual dies, the lower half-tag is supposed to be collected, while the other will remain with the corpse.

=== East Germany ===
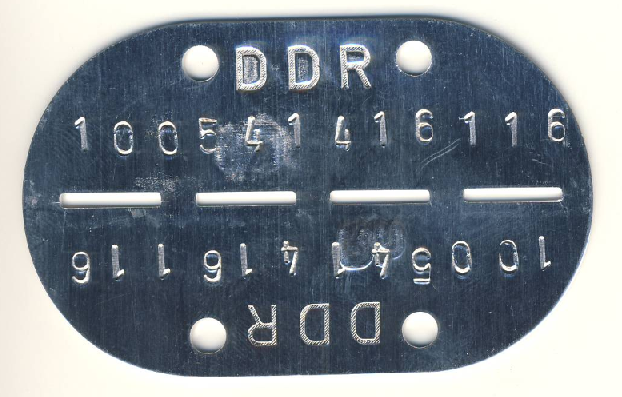
East German Erkennungsmarke (identification tag)

The Nationale Volksarmee used a tag (German: Erkennungsmarke, lit. 'Identification tag') nearly identical to that used by both the Wehrmacht and the West German Bundeswehr.

The oval aluminum tag was stamped "DDR" (Deutsche Demokratische Republik) above the personal ID number; this information was repeated on the bottom half, which was intended to be broken off in case of death.

Oddly, the tag was not worn (but would have been in case of war), but required to be kept in a plastic sleeve in the back of the WDA (German: Wehrdienstausweis) identity booklet.

=== Ecuador ===
The Ecuadorian dog tag (Spanish: Placas de identificación de campaña, lit. 'Campaign identification plate') consists of two long, rectangular steel or aluminum tags with rounded corners and a single hole punched in one end.

The previous design is suspended by a US-type ball chain, with a shorter chain for the second tag. The information on the tag is:

- Family Name & First Name
- Identification Number
- Blood Group, plus "RH" and "+" or "-"

=== Estonia ===
Estonian dog tags are designed to be broken in two. The dog tag is a metallic rounded rectangle suspended by a ball chain. Information consists of four fields:

- National identification number
- Nationality
- Blood Group
- Religion

Example:

- 39305231234
- EST
- A(II) Rh Pos (+)
- NONE

=== Finland ===
In the Finnish Defence Forces, the "identification plate" (Finnish: tunnuslevy; WWII term "tuntolevy") is made of stainless steel and designed to be broken in two; however, the only text on it is the personal identification number and the letters "FI" or "SF" (lit. 'Suomi Finland') in older models, within a tower stamped atop of the upper half.

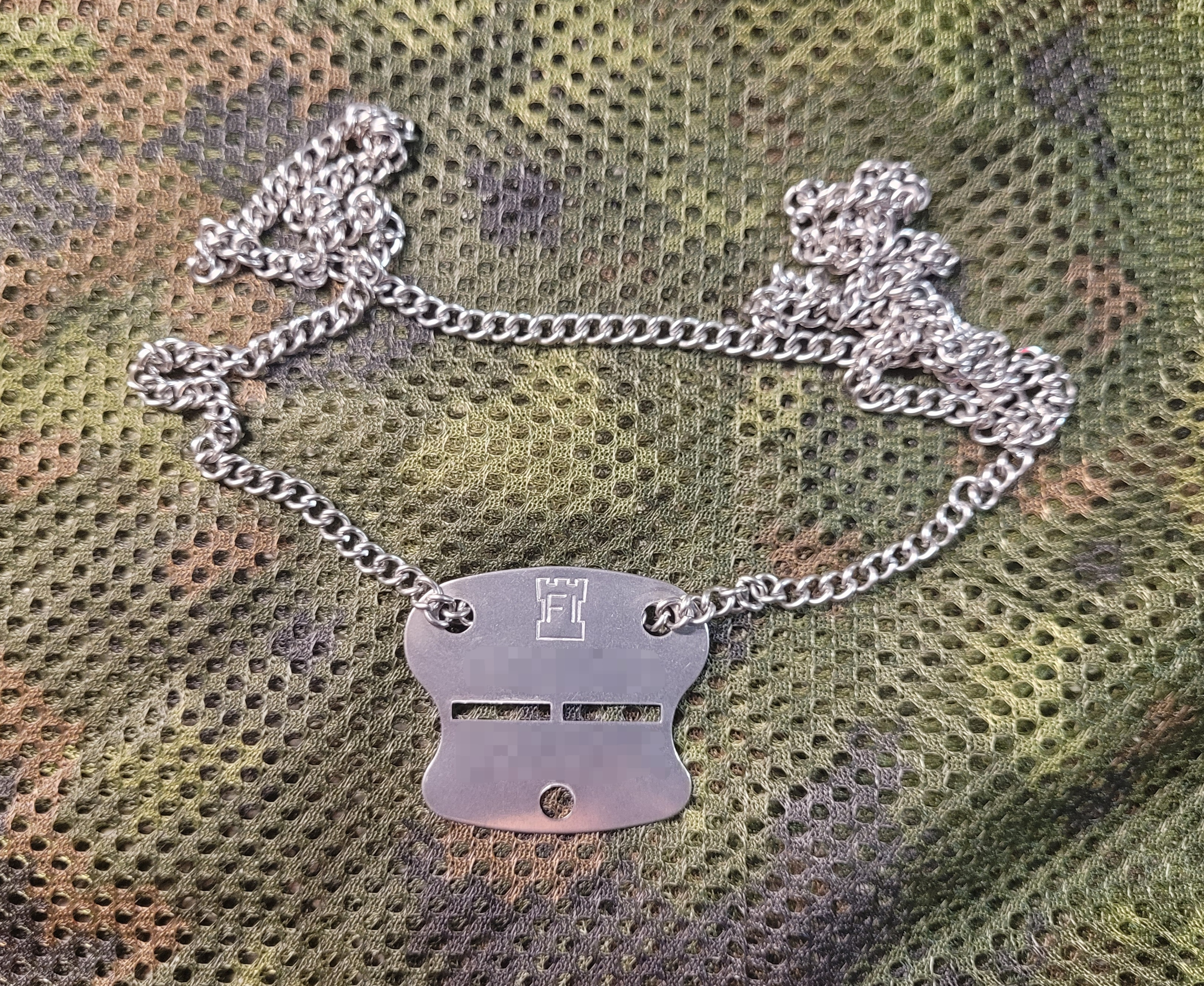
Finnish dog tag

=== France ===
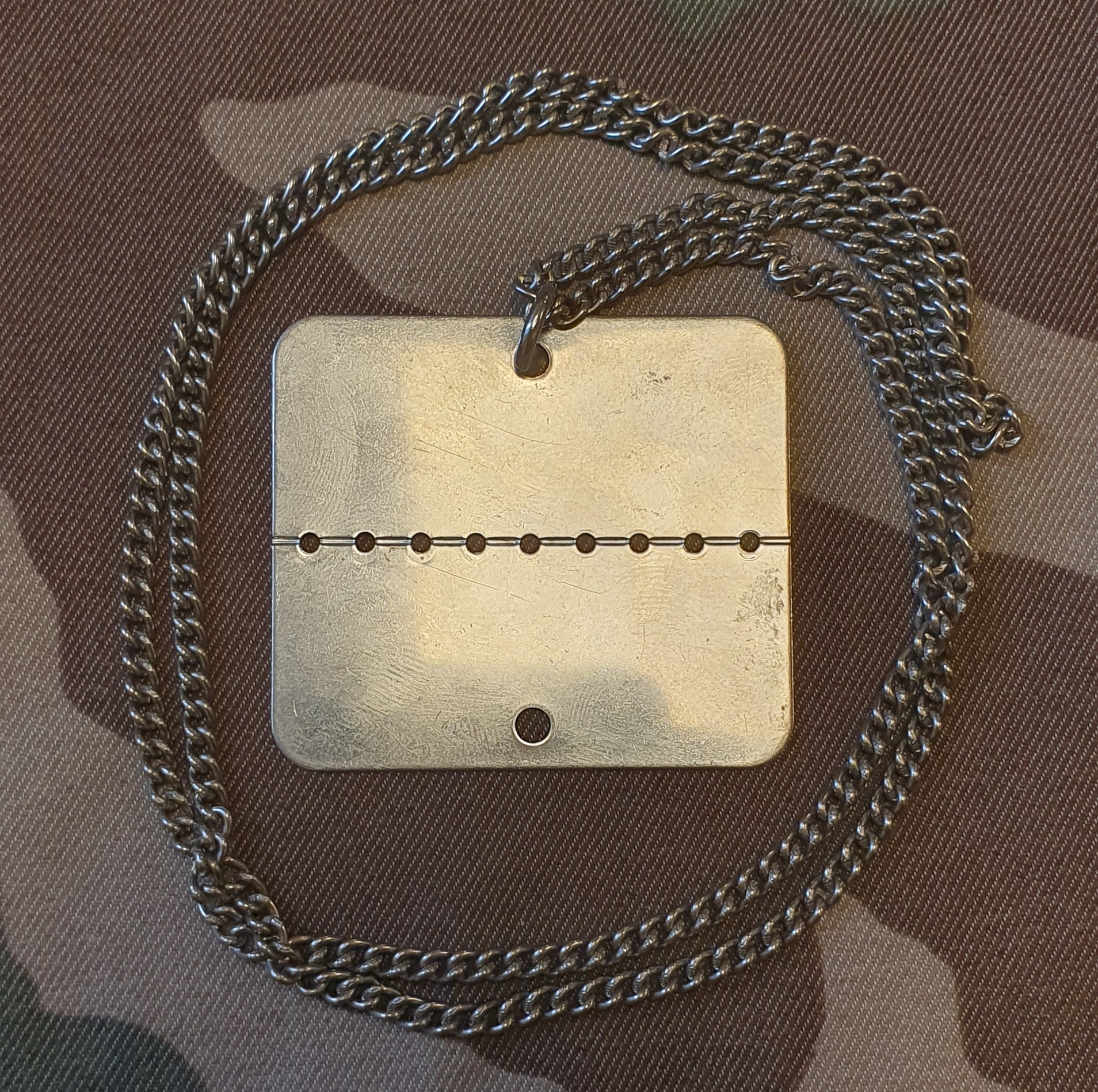
French army ID tag, Mle 1995, blank. Picture shows last model, "plaque d'identité modèle 1995".

In WWI and WWII, French forces used a small oval-shaped disc of metal designed to be broken in half, worn at the wrist.

Now, France issues the dog tag (French: plaque d'identité, lit. 'Identity plate') in either a metallic rounded rectangle in the army, or a pair of discs in the air force and navy. Both are designed to be broken in half, bearing family name & first name above the ID number.

French army tags also include blood type, "T" for Tetanus vaccine and "OFF" only for officers.

=== Germany ===
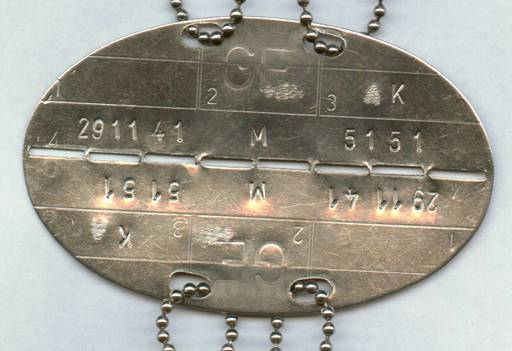
Frontside of a German ID tag from 1961

German Bundeswehr ID tags are an oval-shaped disc designed to be broken in half. They are made of stainless steel, 50.3 millimetres (1.98 in) height and 80 millimetres (3.1 in) width. The two sides contain different information which are mirrored upside-down on the lower half of the ID tag. They feature the following information on segmented and numbered fields:

On the front:

- Field 1: blank (provided for Gender but never used)
- Field 2: DEU (German: Deutschland, lit. 'Germany') (GE (for Germany) only on older ID tags)
- Field 3: Religious preference ("K" or "RK" for Roman Catholic, "E" or "EV" for Protestant, "O" for Christian Orthodox, "ISL" for Islamic, "JD" for Jewish, blank if no preference)
- Field 4: Personenkennziffer (service number: birth date in DDMMYY format, dash, capitalized first letter of last name, dash, and five-digit number based on soldier's home military administrative district, number of persons with the mentioned last name initial and same birthday, and an error-checking number but without dashes), ex. 101281-S-455(-)6(-)8

On the back:

- Field 5: Blood group (A, AB, B, 0)
- Field 6: Rh factor (Rh+ or Rh-)
- Field 7: Vaccination status ("T82" for Tetanus and year of basic immunization)
- Fields 8–10: blank

Bundesamt für Wehrtechnik und Beschaffung of 2009-12-21 specifies shape, materials and characteristics for four parts:

- Identification tag (German: Erkennungsmarke)
  - Stainless steel (German: Edelstahl)
- Identification tag, non-magnetizable (German: Erkennungsmarke, nicht magnetisierbar)
  - For personnel working for special tasks, non-magnetic stainless steel
- Health warn tag (German: Sanitätswarnmarke)
  - Aluminium, anodized red
    - Carried only if necessary with a second chain depending from the lower half of the ID tag
- Necklace (German: Halskette)
  - Kugelkette DIN 5280, stainless steel
    - 2 parts: one long for neck and ID, one short for warn tag to ID tag.

The ID tag is landscape-oval, breakable in two halves with 4–8 manual bends. On the backside each half is 0.2 mm deep marked with "DEU" (German: Deutschland, lit. 'Germany'), the non-magnetic type on both halves and both sides with "NM".

The metal sheet is 0.7 mm thick, material codes X5CrNi1810 or 1.4301, weighs about 16 g. NM-variant shall consist of 1.4311 or 1.4401. Sharp edges have to be smoothed, then the plate electropolished. Mechanical deburring and ball polishing is allowed.

The letters stamped in for the person must stay readable after a glow test for 10 minutes in air at 1200 °C.

The ball chain is of X5CrNi1810, diameter of ball is 3.5 mm, that of the wire 1.5 mm. Closure is of 1.4301, stainless steel, too. The long chain is 680 + 30 mm long, the short one 145 + 7 mm. Breaking force of the chain including the closure must reach 100 N, after 10 min glow at 1200 °C in air at least 10 N.

=== Greece ===
In Greece, identification tags include the following information:

- Surname
- First name
- Service number (where date of birth is included as "class")
- Blood Group

=== Hungary ===
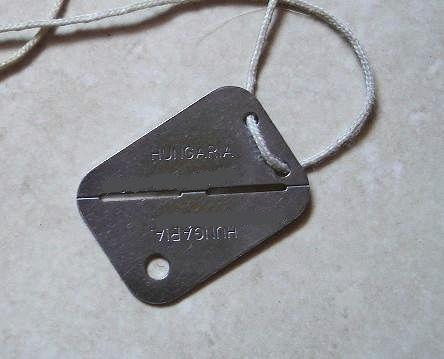
Hungarian 1978M current issue dog tag

The Hungarian army dog tag is made out of steel, forming a 25×35 mm tag designed to split diagonally.

Both sides contain the same information: the soldier's personal identity code, blood group and the word HUNGARIA. Some may not have the blood group on them.

These are only issued to soldiers who are serving outside of the country. If the soldier should die, one side is removed and kept for the army's official records, while the other side is left attached to the body.

=== Iraq ===
The Saddam-era Iraqi Army used a single, long, rectangular metal tag with oval ends, inscribed (usually by hand) with Name and Number or Unit, and occasionally Blood Type.

=== Israel ===
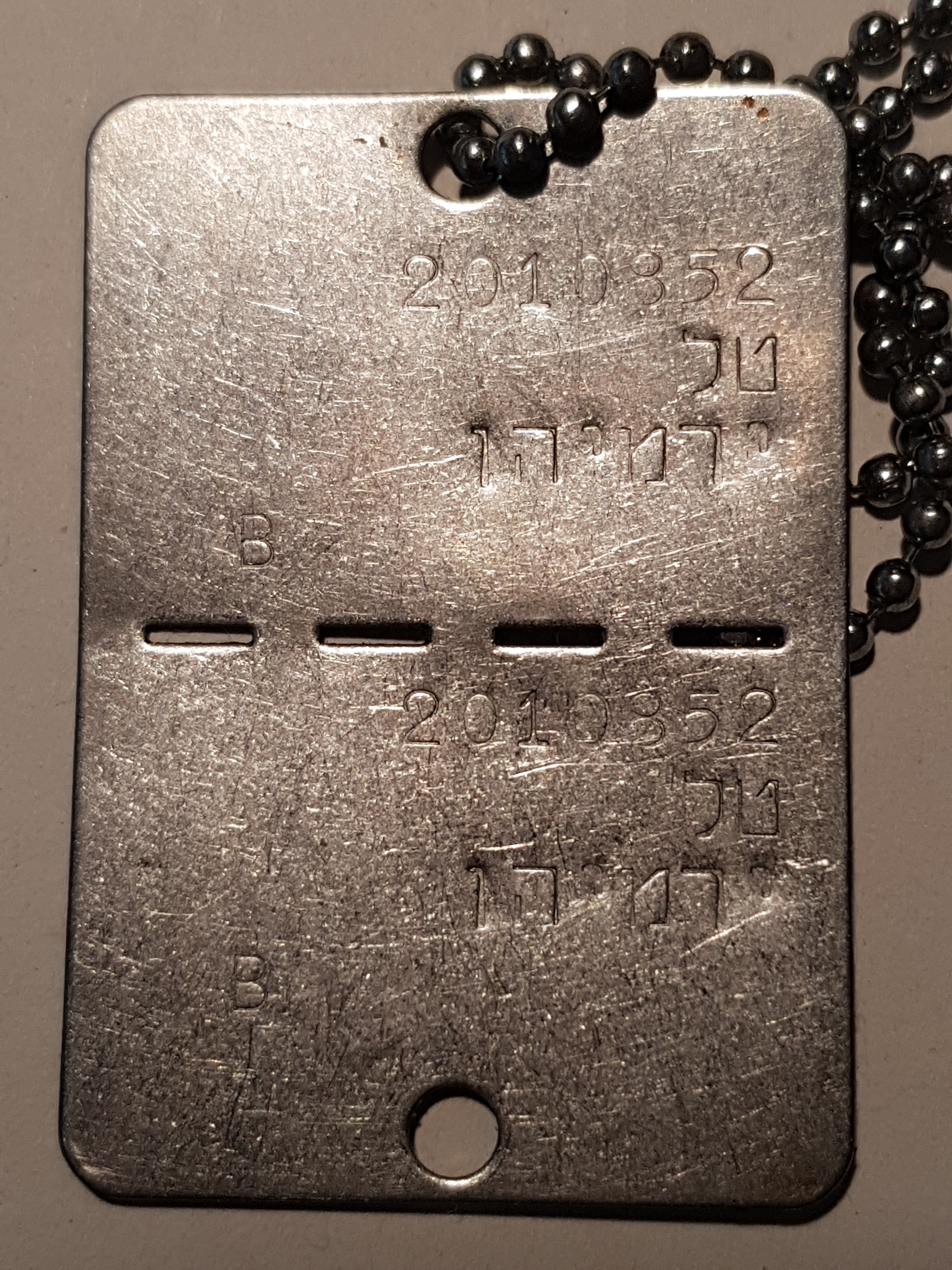
Israel Defense Forces Dog tag (issued 1966). Identification number, last name, first name, blood type.

Dog tags of the Israel Defense Forces are designed to be broken in two. The information appears in three lines (twice):

- Army identification number ("mispar ishi", literally "personal number". A seven-digit number that is different from the nine-digit identification number for citizens).
- Last name
- First Name
- Blood Type (ABO group – in some years)

Recruits are issued with 2 Dogtags (4 halves total), one remains whole and worn on a necklace, and the second is broken into its halves and placed in each military boot for the purpose of Identifying dead soldiers (IDF Military Boots contain pouches on their inner sides at the 1/3 calf height, the pouches have holes corresponding in size and placement to those on the discs, allowing for fastening, often via small cable ties).

Originally the IDF issued two circular aluminum tags (1948 – late 1950s) stamped in three lines with serial number, family name, and first name. The tags were threaded together through a single hole onto a cord worn around the neck.

=== Italy ===
Rectangular piece, 35×45 mm, designed to be broken in two. Includes soldier's first and last name, coded date and place of birth, identification number, religious affiliation, and blood group.

=== Japan ===
Japan follows a similar system to the US Army for Japan Self-Defense Forces personnel, and the appearance of the tags is similar, although laser etched. The exact information order is as follows.

- Japan Ground Self-Defense Force
  - JAPAN GSDF
  - First name, last name
  - Identification number
  - Blood type
- Japan Maritime Self-Defense Force
  - First name, last name
  - Identification number
  - JAPAN MSDF
  - Blood type
- Japan Air Self-Defense Force
  - First name, last name
  - Identification number
  - JAPAN ASDF
  - Blood type

=== Malaysia ===
Malaysian Armed Forces have two identical oval tags with this information:

- NRIC number (The last digit is an odd number for a male soldier, and an even number for a female soldier.)
- Service number
- Full name
- Blood type
- Religion
- Branch (e.g., TLDM)

If more information needed, another two oval wrist tags are provided. The term wrist tags can be used to refer to the bracelet-like wristwatch. The additional tags only need to be worn on the wrist, with the main tags still on the neck. All personnel are allowed to attach a small religious pendant or locket; this makes a quick identifiable reference for their funeral services.

=== Mexico ===
The Mexican Army uses two long identity tags, very similar to the ones used in the United States Army. They are rectangular metal tags with oval ends, embossed with name, serial number, and blood type, plus Rh factor.

=== Netherlands ===
Dutch military identity tags, like the Canadian and Norwegian ones, are designed to be broken in two in the case of a fatality; the lower end is returned to Dutch Defence Headquarters, while the upper half remains on the body.

The tags contain the following information:

- Upper half:
  - Name and family name
  - Service number
  - Nationality and religion
  - Blood group with RH factor
- Lower half: identical.

There is a difference in the Army and Air Force service number and the Navy service number:

- The Army and Air Force service number is made up of the date of birth in YY.MM.DD. format, for example 83.01.15, and a three-digit number, such as 123.
- The Navy service number is made up out of random five- or six-digit numbers.

=== Norway ===
Norwegian dog tags are designed to be broken in two like the Canadian and the Dutch version:

- The top half contains the nationality, the eleven-digit birth number and the blood type.
- The bottom half contains the nationality and birth number and has a hole so the broken-off half can be hung on a ring.

=== Poland ===
The first dog tags were issued in Poland following the order of the General Staff of December 12, 1920. The earliest design (Polish: kapsel legitymacyjny, lit. 'identification cap') consisted of a tin-made 30×50 mm rectangular frame and a rectangular cap fitting into the frame.

Soldiers' details were filled in a small ID card placed inside the frame, as well as on the inside of the frame itself. The dog tag was similar to the tags used by the Austro-Hungarian Army during World War I. In case the soldier died, the frame was left with his body, while the lid was returned to his unit together with a note on his death. The ID card was handed over to the chaplain or the rabbi.

In 1928, a new type of dog tag was proposed by gen. bryg. Stanisław Rouppert, Poland's representative at the International Red Cross. It was slightly modified and adopted in 1931 under the name of Nieśmiertelnik wz. 1931 (lit. 'Immortalizer, pattern 1931').

The new design consisted of an oval piece of metal (ideally steel, but in most cases aluminum alloy was used), roughly 40 by 50 millimeters. There were two rectangular holes in the middle to allow for easier breaking of them into halves.

The halves contained the same set of data – name, religion, place of birth, year of birth – and were identical, except the upper half had two holes for a string or twine to go through, and the lower had one hole.

The 2008 pattern (Polish: wz. 2008) specifies two Stadium-shaped 0.8mm-thick 51×27mm tags with a 3mm hole, made of heat-resistant steel, engraved with:

- first name
- surname
- PESEL (the national ID number)
- a blank line
- blood type

parallel to the long axis, and the name of Polish Armed Forces (Polish: Siły Zbrojne RP) and the Polish coat of arms on the rounded end opposite the hole.

The 2024 pattern (Polish: wz. 2024) returns to a single 40×50mm ellipsis with 2+1 holes, of stainless steel, 1mm thick, laser-engraved, indented across the short axis with two rectangular holes to break apart, with each half containing

- first name
- surname
- second line of double-barrelled surname
- PESEL

and

- "Siły zbrojne RP"
- religion (on user request)
- blood type
- serial number

on the obverse. The halves are flipped with respect to each other, such that when unbroken, both sides contain all information.

=== Rhodesia ===
The former Republic of Rhodesia used two WW2 British-style compressed asbestos fiber tags, a No. 1 octagonal (grey) tag and a No. 2 circular (red) tag, stamped with identical information. The red tag was supposedly fireproof and the grey tag rotproof. The following information was stamped on the tags: Number, Name, Initials, & Religion; Blood Type was stamped on reverse. The air force and BSAP often stamped their service on the reverse side above the blood group.

=== Russia ===
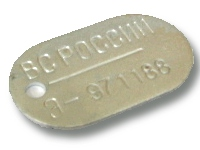
Russian dog tag

The Russian Armed Forces use oval metal tags, similar to the dog tags of the Soviet Army.

Each tag contains the title Armed Forces of Russia (Russian: ВС РОССИИ) and the individual's alphanumeric number, as shown on the photo.

==== Wagner Group ====
The Wagner Group, a private militia funded by the Russian government that is currently fighting the Russo-Ukrainian War, reportedly provides its soldiers with generic 'contact us' dogtags.

=== Singapore ===
The Singapore Armed Forces-issued dog tags are inscribed (not embossed) with up to four items:

- NRIC number
- Blood type
- Religion
- Drug allergies (if any; inscribed on the reverse)

The dog tags consist of two metal pieces, one oval with two holes and one round with one hole. A synthetic lanyard is threaded through both holes in the oval piece and tied around the wearer's neck. The round piece is tied to the main loop on a shorter loop.

=== South Africa ===
The South African National Defence Force use two long, rectangular stainless steel tags with oval ends, stamped with :

- Serial number
- Name and initials
- Religion
- Blood type.

=== South Korea ===
The South Korean army issues two long, rectangular tags with oval ends, stamped (in Korean lettering).

The tags are worn on the neck with a ball chain. The tags contain the information listed below:

- Branch (Army, Air Force, Navy, Marines)
- Service Number; the first two digits state the starting year of service and the other eight digits state the specific unit of the person.
- Name
- Blood group followed by Rh factor

=== South Vietnam ===
The South Vietnamese Army and the South Vietnamese Navy used two American-style dog tags. Some tags added religion on the back (Vietnamese: Phật Giáo, lit. 'Buddhism'). They were stamped or inscribed with:

- Name
- SQ (Vietnamese: Số Quân, lit. 'Service number') a 2-digit year number, followed by a military serial number
- LM (Vietnamese: loại máu, lit. 'Blood Group', rH factor)

=== Soviet Union ===
During World War II, the Red Army did not issue metal dog tags to its troops. They were issued small black Bakelite cylinders containing a slip of paper with a soldier's particulars written on it. These do not hold up as well as metal dog tags.

After World War II, the Soviet Army used oval metal tags, similar to today's dog tags of the Russian Armed forces. Each tag contains the title Soviet Armed Forces (Russian: ВС СССР, lit. 'USSR Armed Forces') and the individual's alphanumeric number.

=== Spain ===
Issues a single metal oval, worn vertically, stamped "ESPAÑA" (lit. 'Spain') above and below the 3-slot horizontal break line. It is stamped in 4 lines with:

- 1st line – Religion
- 2nd line – left side = blood group, right side = any medical allergies (SI or NO)
- 3rd line – military service (ET, EA ...)
- 4th (longest) line = DNI military number.

=== Sweden ===
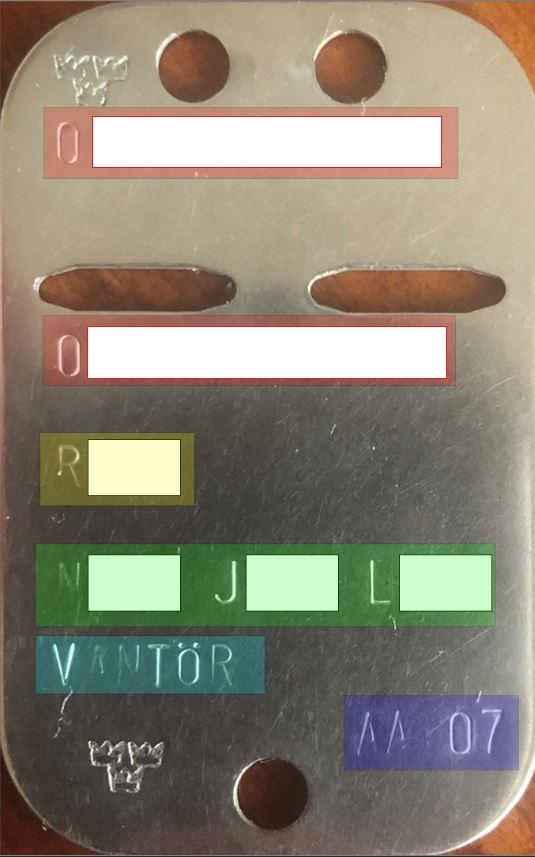
Components of a Swedish dog tag Personal identity number Surname First name and middle name(s) Residence at birth County code ("AA"), Issue year

Swedish identification tags are designed to be able to break apart. The information on them was prior to 2010 and are as follows:

- Personal identity number (twice, once in the upper part and once below)
- Surname
- first and middle name(s)
- Residence at birth
- Blood type (only on some)
- County code
- Issue year

Swedish dog tags issued to Armed Forces personnel after 2010 are, for personal security reasons, only marked with a personal identity number.

During the Cold War, dog tags were issued to everyone, often soon after birth, since the threat of total war also meant the risk of severe civilian casualties.

However, in 2010, the Government decided that the dog tags were not needed anymore.

=== Switzerland ===
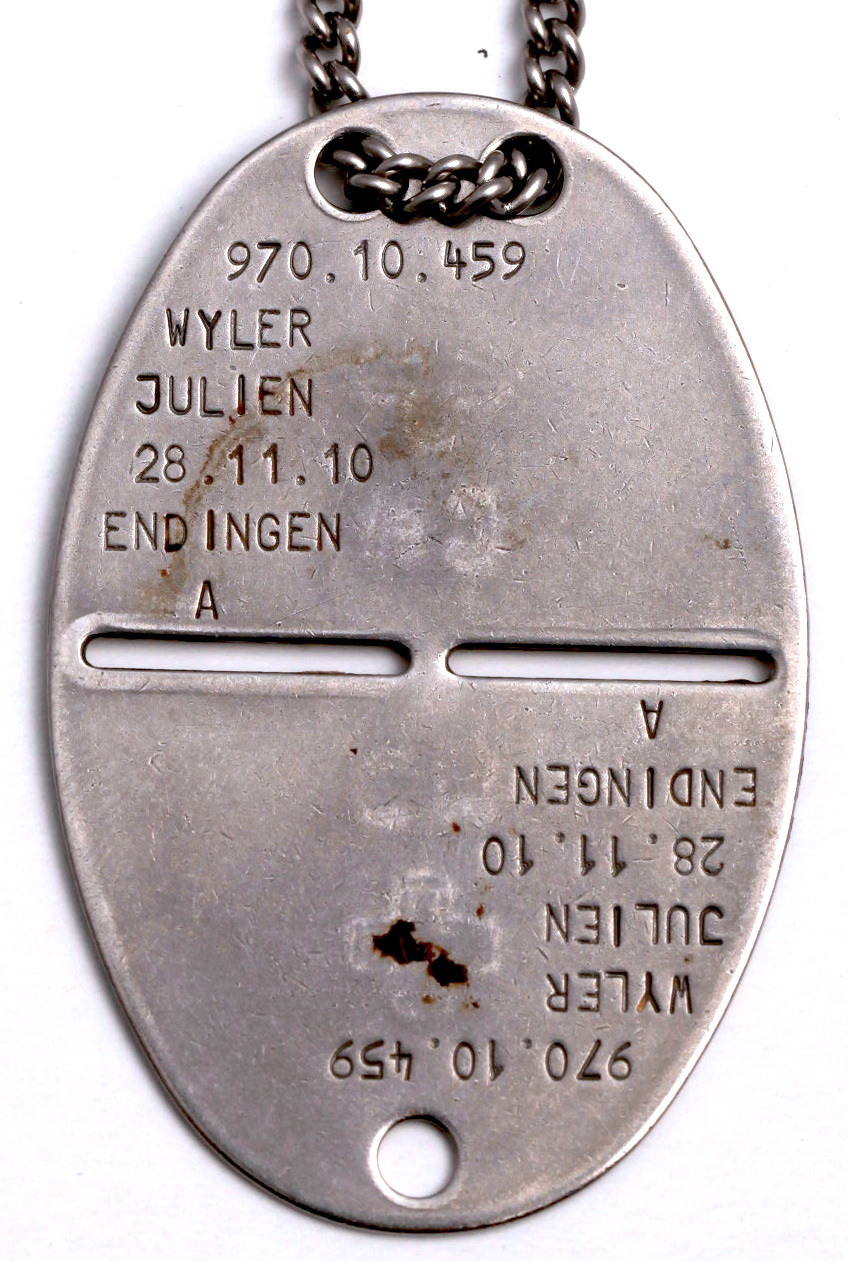
Swiss dog tag.

Swiss Armed Forces ID tag is an oval shaped non reflective plaque, containing the following information:

- Social insurance number
- Surname
- First name
- Date of birth in DD.MM.YY format

On the back side the letters CH (Latin: Confoederatio Helvetica, lit. 'The Swiss Confederation') are engraved next to a Swiss cross.

=== Turkey ===
A Turkish military dog tag is an official identification plate consisting of two rectangular stainless steel plates attached to the neck with a chain, given after basic training. It contains information such as name, surname, Turkish Republic identity number, blood type, place of origin, and religious belief (M/H) to facilitate the identification of fallen or wounded soldiers.

=== United Kingdom ===
The British Armed Forces currently use two circular non-reflecting stainless steel tags, referred to as "ID Disks", engraved with the following 'Big 5' details:

1. Blood group
2. Service Number
3. Last name (Surname)
4. Initials
5. Religion (Abbreviated, e.g. R.C. – Roman Catholic)
6. Branch ("RAF" – only for RAF members)

The discs are suspended from one long chain (24 inches long) and one short chain (4.5 inches long)

During World Wars One and Two, service personnel were issued pressed fibre identity disks, one green octagonal shaped disc, and a red round disc (some army units issued a second red round disc to be attached to the service respirator). The identity disks were hand stamped with the surname, initials, service number and religion of the holder and if in the Royal Air Force, the initials RAF. The disks were worn around the neck on a 38" length of cotton cord, this was often replaced by the wearer with a leather bootlace. One tag was suspended below the main tag.

The fibre identity disks in the RAF were still in use in 1999.

From 1960 these were replaced with stainless steel ID tags on a green nylon cord, two circular and one oval. The oval was withdrawn around 1990.

=== United States ===
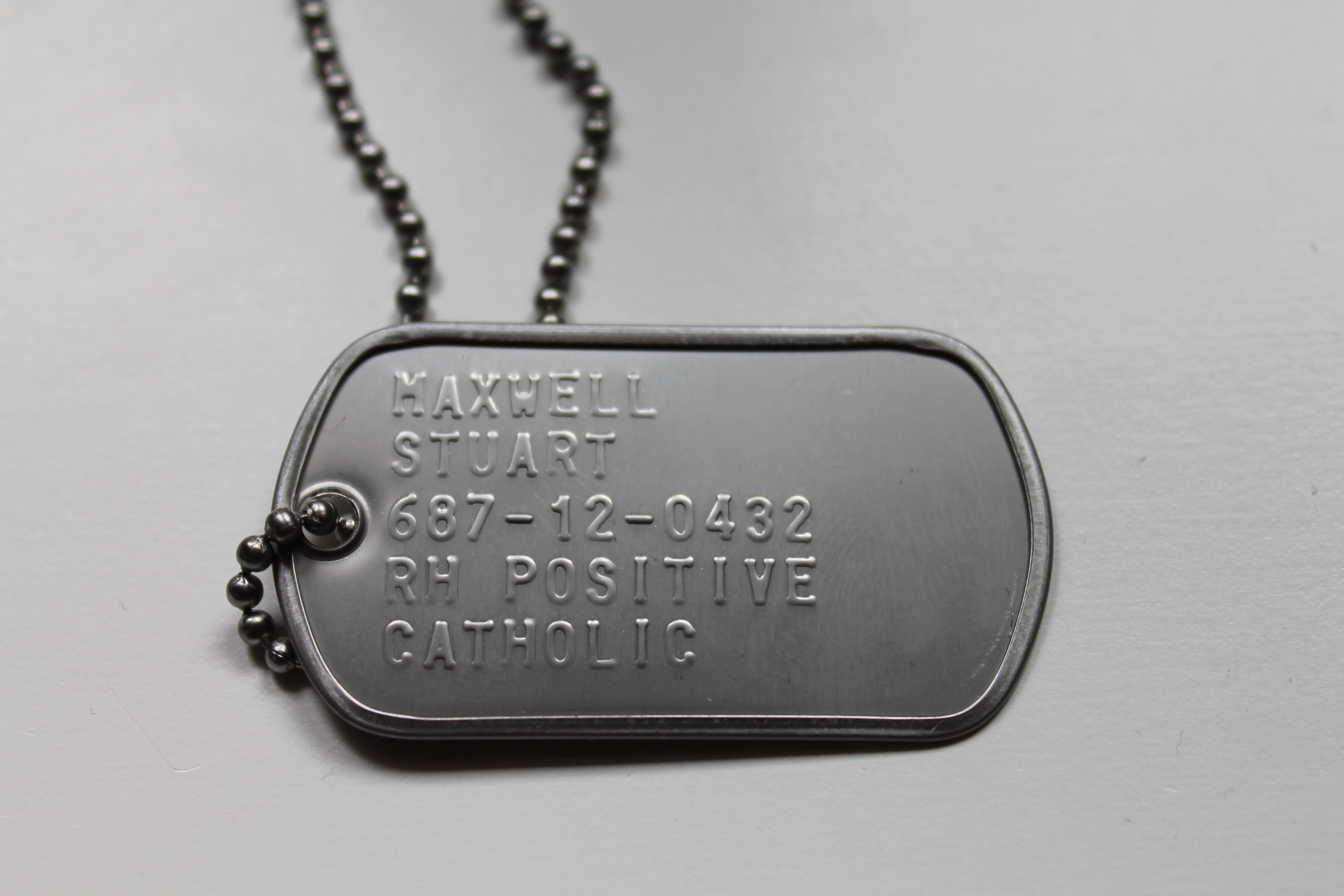
An American dog tag showing the recipient's last name, first name, Social Security number, blood type, and religion.

Tags are properly known as identification tags; the term "dog tags" has never been used in regulations.

The U.S. Armed Forces typically carry two identical oval dog tags containing:

U.S. Air Force (Pre-2019)

- Last name
- First name and middle initial
- Social Security number (Or DoD ID number post-2012), followed by "AF" indicating branch of service
- Blood Group
- Religion

U.S. Air Force (Modern)

- Last name
- First name and middle initial
- DoD ID number without hyphens
- Blood group and Rh factor
- Religious Preference

U.S. Marine Corps

- Last name
- First and middle initials and suffix; blood group
- EDIPI number
- Branch ("USMC"); Gas mask size (S – small, M – medium, L – large)
- Religious preference, or medical allergy if red medical tag

U.S. Navy (Historic, the U.S. Navy no longer issues dog tags)

- Last name, first name, middle initial
- Social Security number with no dashes or spaces followed immediately by "USN", space, blood group
- Religion

U.S. Army

- Last name
- First name and middle initial
- Dept of Defense ID number (replaced Social Security number in November 2015)
- Blood type
- Religion

U.S. Coast Guard (Historic, the U.S. Coast Guard no longer issues dog tags)

- Last name, first name, middle initial
- Social Security number, no dashes or spaces, followed immediately by "USCG"
- Blood group
- Religion

==== Religious designation ====
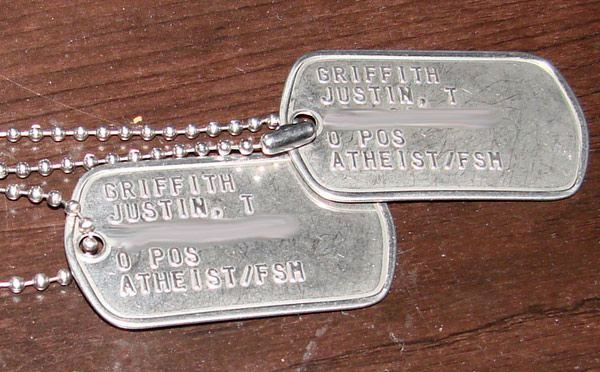
Custom tags showing Atheist/FSM as religion, made in response to a US Army representative refusing to print 'Atheist' on official dog tags. Custom dog tags are permitted as long as they adhere to US Army regulations.

During World War II, an American dog tag could indicate only one of three religions through the inclusion of one letter: "P" for Protestant, "C" for Catholic, or "H" for Jewish (from 'Hebrew'), or (according to at least one source) "NO" to indicate no religious preference. Army regulations (606–5) soon included X and Y in addition to P, C, and H: the X indicating any religion not included in the first three, such as Islam or Eastern Orthodoxy, and the Y indicating either no religion or a choice not to list religion. By the time of the Vietnam War, some IDs spelled out the broad religious choices such as PROTESTANT and CATHOLIC, rather than using initials, and also began to show individual denominations such as "METHODIST" or "BAPTIST". Tags varied by service, however, such as the use of "CATH" instead of "CATHOLIC" on some Navy tags. For those with no religious affiliation and those who chose not to list an affiliation, either the space for religion was left blank or the words "NO PREFERENCE" or "NO RELIGIOUS PREF" (or the abbreviation "NO PREF") were included.

Although American dog tags currently include the recipient's religion as a way of ensuring that religious needs will be met (including appropriate burial rites), some personnel have them reissued without religious affiliation listed—or keep two sets, one with the designation and one without—out of fear that identification as a member of a particular religion could increase the danger to their welfare or their lives if they fell into enemy hands. Some Jewish personnel avoided flying over German lines during WWII with ID tags that indicated their religion, and some Jewish personnel avoid the religious designation today out of concern that they could be captured by extremists who are anti-Semitic. Additionally, when American troops were first sent to Saudi Arabia during the Gulf War there were allegations that some U.S. military authorities were pressuring Jewish military personnel to avoid listing their religions on their ID tags.

== Popular culture ==
=== Fashion ===
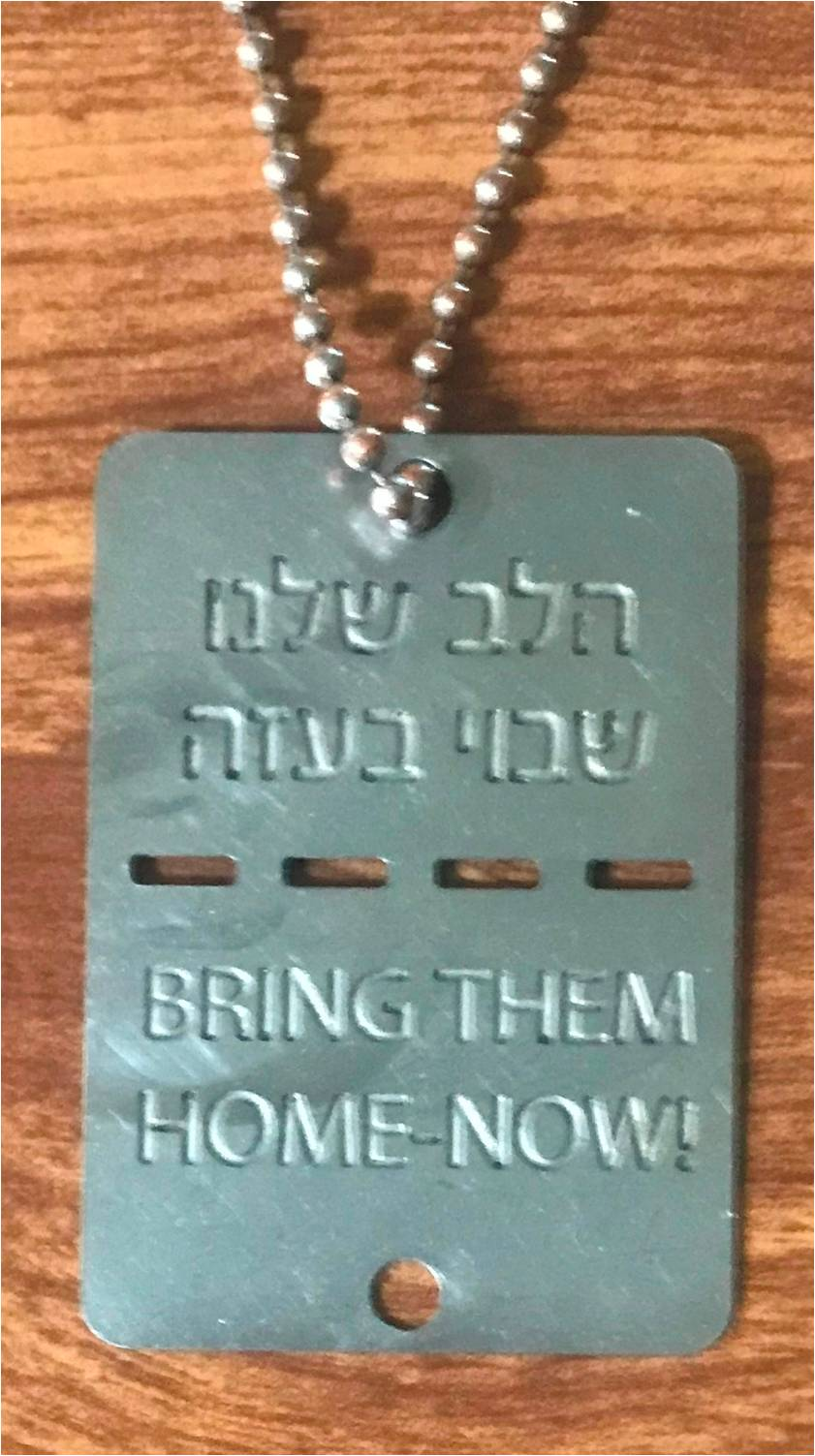
A vanity dog tag distributed by the Hostages and Missing Families Forum (Note: Translation of the Hebrew portion of the dogtag:"our [collective] heart is being held captive in Gaza")

Originally worn as a part of a military uniform by youth wishing to present a tough or militaresque image, dog tags have since reached wider fashion circles, including youth fashion as military chic.

Fashionable dog tags may be inscribed with a person's details, beliefs or tastes, a favorite quote, or may bear the name or logo of a band or performer. The wearing of dog tags as a fashion accessory might be considered disrespectful or as stolen valor by some military personnel.

=== Gaza war hostage crisis ===
After the October 7 attacks, in which over 250 hostages were kidnapped, people in Israel and elsewhere wore specially made vanity dog tags to raise awareness of the plight of the hostages being held in the Gaza Strip. Proceeds from sales of the vanity dog tags went to fund causes such as the Hostages and Missing Families Forum.

== See also ==
- Medical tattoo, also known as a meat tag
