= Signaculum =

Roman stamped ID tag or mark

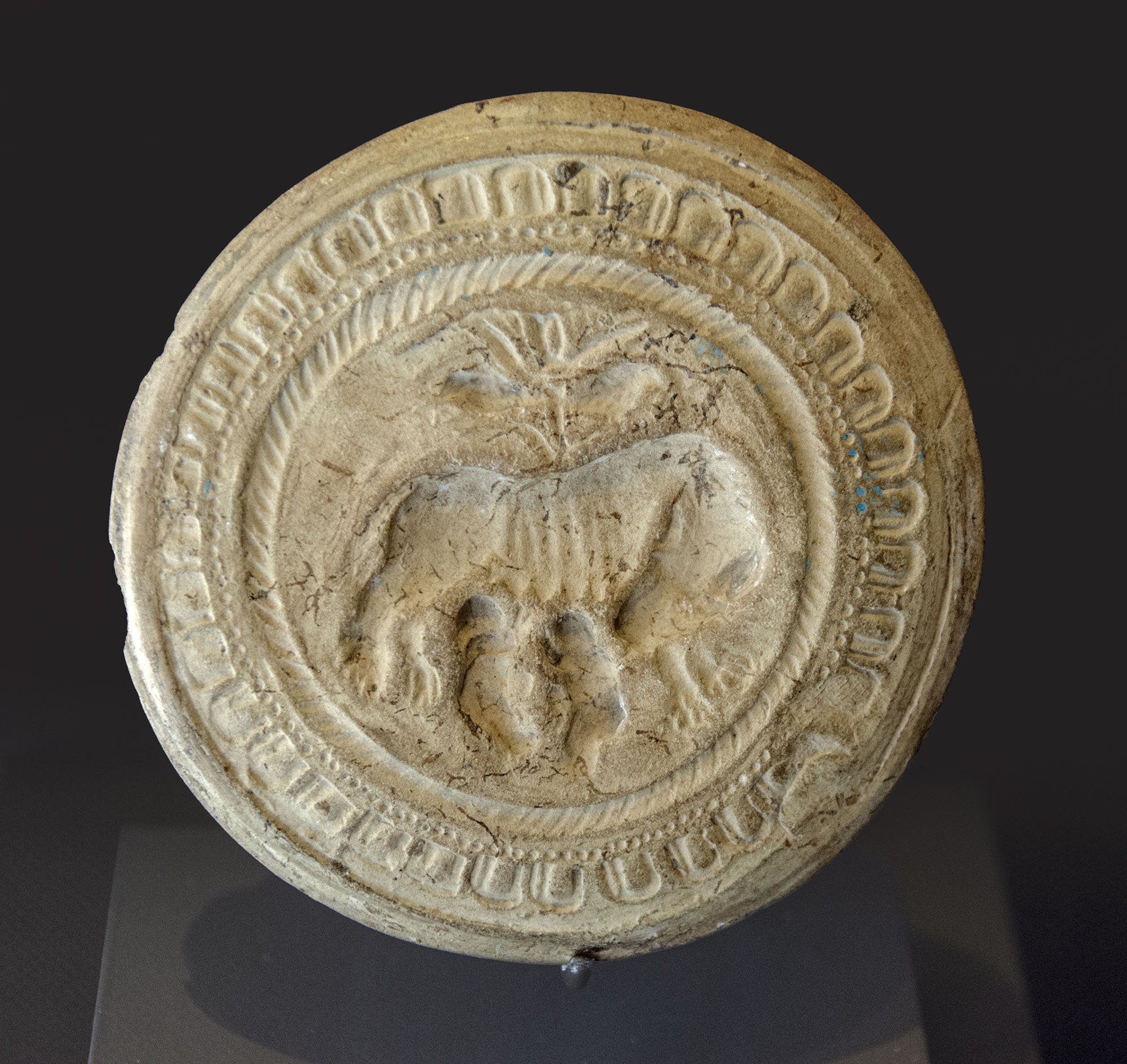
Bread stamp depicting Romulus and Remus suckling at the she-wolf (1st century)

A signaculum is a general Latin term for a seal or sign produced by a stamp or signet ring, used in modern scholarship in particular reference to Roman lead pipe inscriptions, brick stamps, bread stamps, and the lead "dog tag" of Roman soldiers.

== Military "dog tag" ==
The signaculum of the Roman soldier was carried in a leather pouch suspended around the neck. The tag is thought to have had personal information for the purpose identifying the dead, in the same way a modern dog tag does, with a seal or stamp to authenticate it.

The signaculum was issued together with enrollment in the list of recruits, was made at the beginning of a four-month probatory period (Latin: probatio). The recruit obtained the military status only after the oath of allegiance (Latin: sacramentum) at the end of "probatio", meaning that from a legal point of view the "signaculum" was given to a subject who was no longer a civilian, but not yet in the military.

Although the origins of exactly when or why the Roman army decided to use the signaculum for their soldiers are not clear, there are, regardless, references to its use in some historical documents, which indicate its composition (lead), as well as the fact that it is given after it is determined a man is fit to serve the legion. In a document from 295, Maximilian of Tebessa, an early Christian martyr, is being recruited as an officer in the Roman army against his wishes:

When he was being got ready, Maximilianus replied: 'I cannot serve as a soldier. I cannot do evil. I am a Christian.' Dio the proconsul replied, 'Let him be measured.' When he had been measured, his height was read out by an equerry, 'He is five feet, ten inches.' Dio said to the equerry, 'Give him the signaculum.' Maximilianus resisted and replied, 'I do not do so. I cannot serve as a soldier. I am a Christian. I do not accept the signaculum of the secular world, and if you give me the signaculum, I will break it, because it has no validity. I cannot carry a piece of lead around my neck after the sign of my Lord. 'Dio said,'Remove his name.'

There is some evidence that by the time of the late Roman army, it became common practice to instead give soldiers who were found fit for service in the legion an indelible Soldier's Mark, possibly to discourage desertion by making any former or deserting soldiers clearly discernible.

In De Re Militari (AD 390), a Roman military writer Vegetius Renatus states that after the initial selection process, a recruit is then placed through a four-month testing period to ensure his physical capability.

many, though promising enough in appearance, are found very unfit upon trial. These are to be rejected and replaced by better men; for it is not numbers, but bravery which carries the day. After their examination, the recruits should then receive the military mark, and be taught the use of their arms by constant and daily exercise.

== Slave collars ==
A neck ring with a tag served a similar purpose in identifying a fugitive slave. The ring was riveted so that it couldn't readily be removed. The tag contained information such as the owner's name, status, and occupation, and the "address" to which the slave should be returned.

== Product branding ==
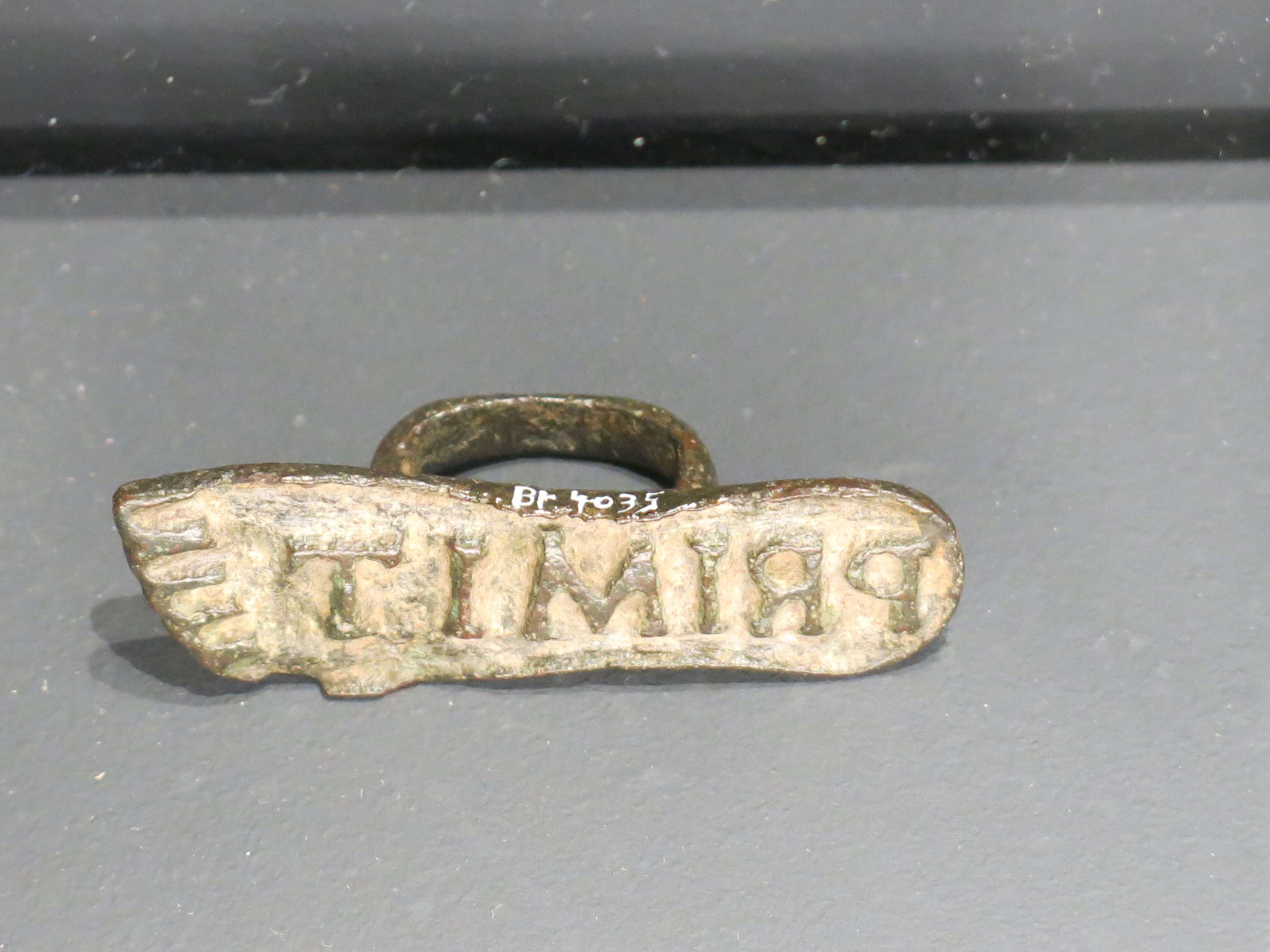
Signaculum stamp in the shape of a foot with the word PRIMIT

Items made from terra cotta, lead, and other impressionable materials were often stamped with a maker's mark during manufacture.

=== Stamps ===
It is possible that signacula that were carried by domestic workers were used as stamps to record usage of tools, and debts from one to another.
