= Graphotype (machine) =

Brand name of embosing machines

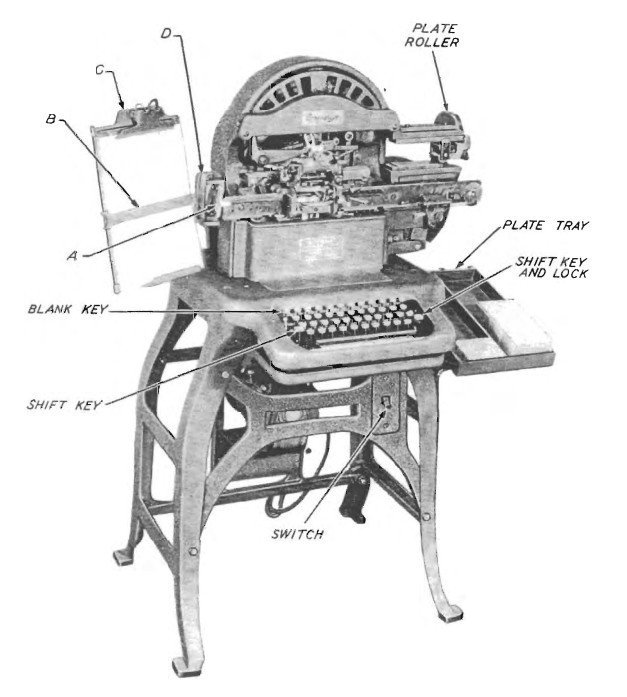
Graphotype Class 6380

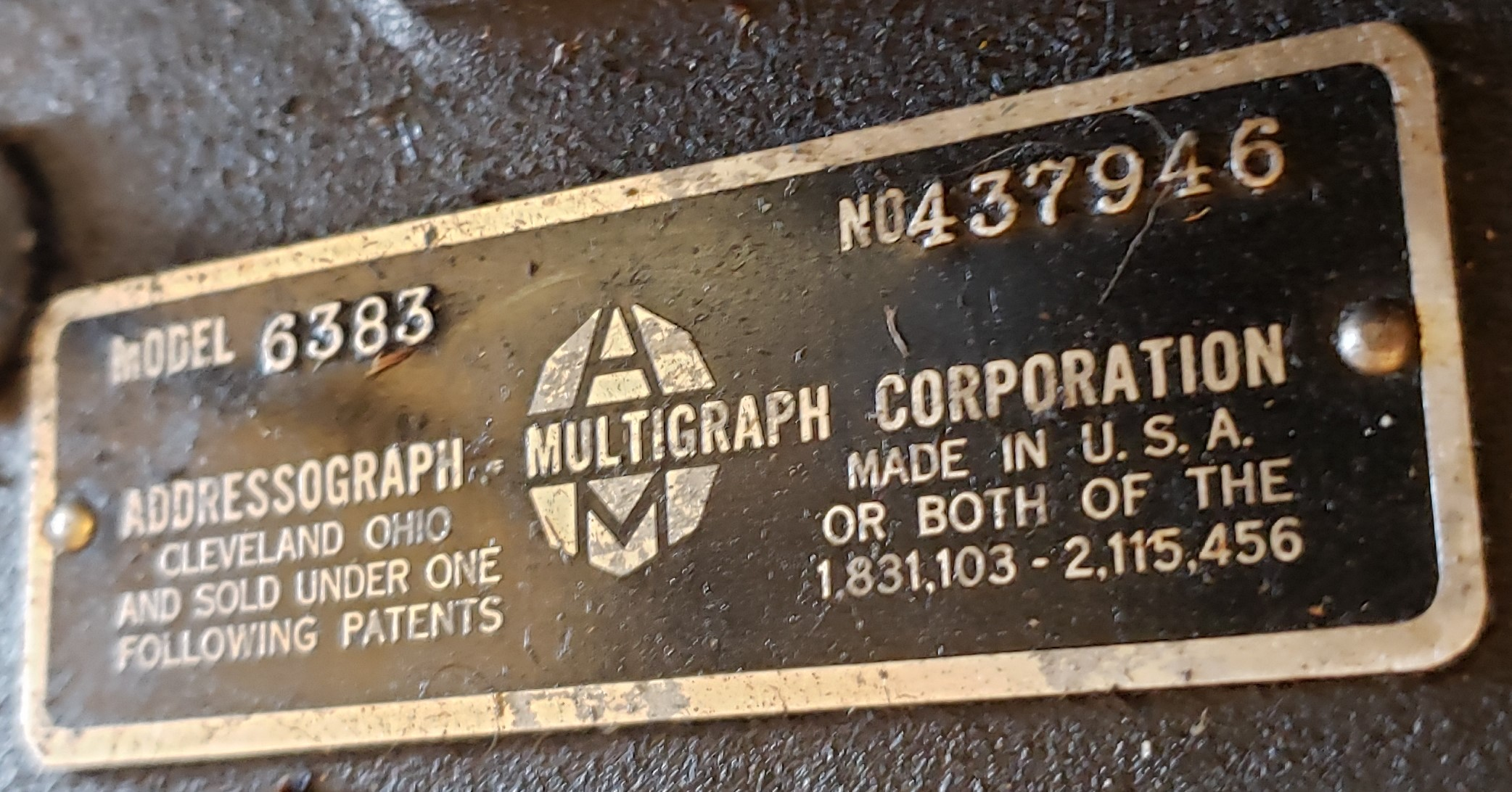
Graphotype Model 6383 plate

Graphotype was a brand name used by the Addressograph-Multigraph Company for its range of metal plate embossing machines.

The machines were originally used to create address plates for the Addressograph system and mark military style identity tags and other industrial nameplates.

The machines came in a number of variants with sliding, hand wheel or keyboard selected letters. The keyboard models and some rotary select units were motorised to allow faster operation.

The machines used in making Addressograph plates would deboss (stamp into the plate) the letters into the plate resulting in a well defined printing surface resembling the typewriter fonts of the day on the reverse side that would be used to transfer the details (usually customer addresses) onto envelopes or form letters. The same style was used in the early 1940s to 1980s for the US military identification tags and the tag details could be transferred onto medical charts using a hand held imprinter in field hospital conditions.

These same machines also found use in marking other nameplates and rating plates in industry and for this an embossed (raised letters in the style found on contemporary credit cards) marking style was preferred for ease of reading and maintaining a flat surface on the back of the plate. Military tags moved over to this style when the imprinting use was deprecated in the late 1960s and new machines would only be supplied as embossing units as the address plate market had been taken over by the computer revolution.
