= Addressograph =

19th-century address printing machine

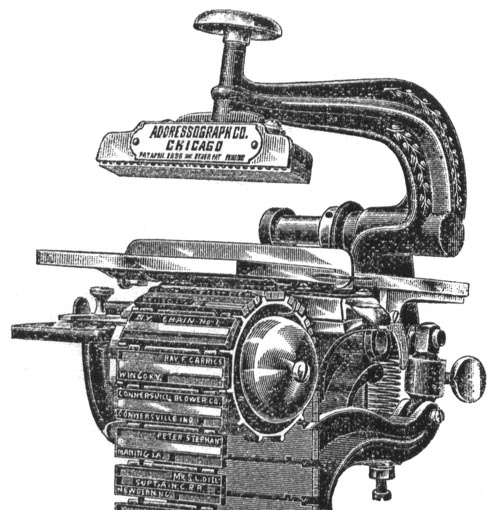
Illustration of 1896 Addressograph with movable belt of rubber plates

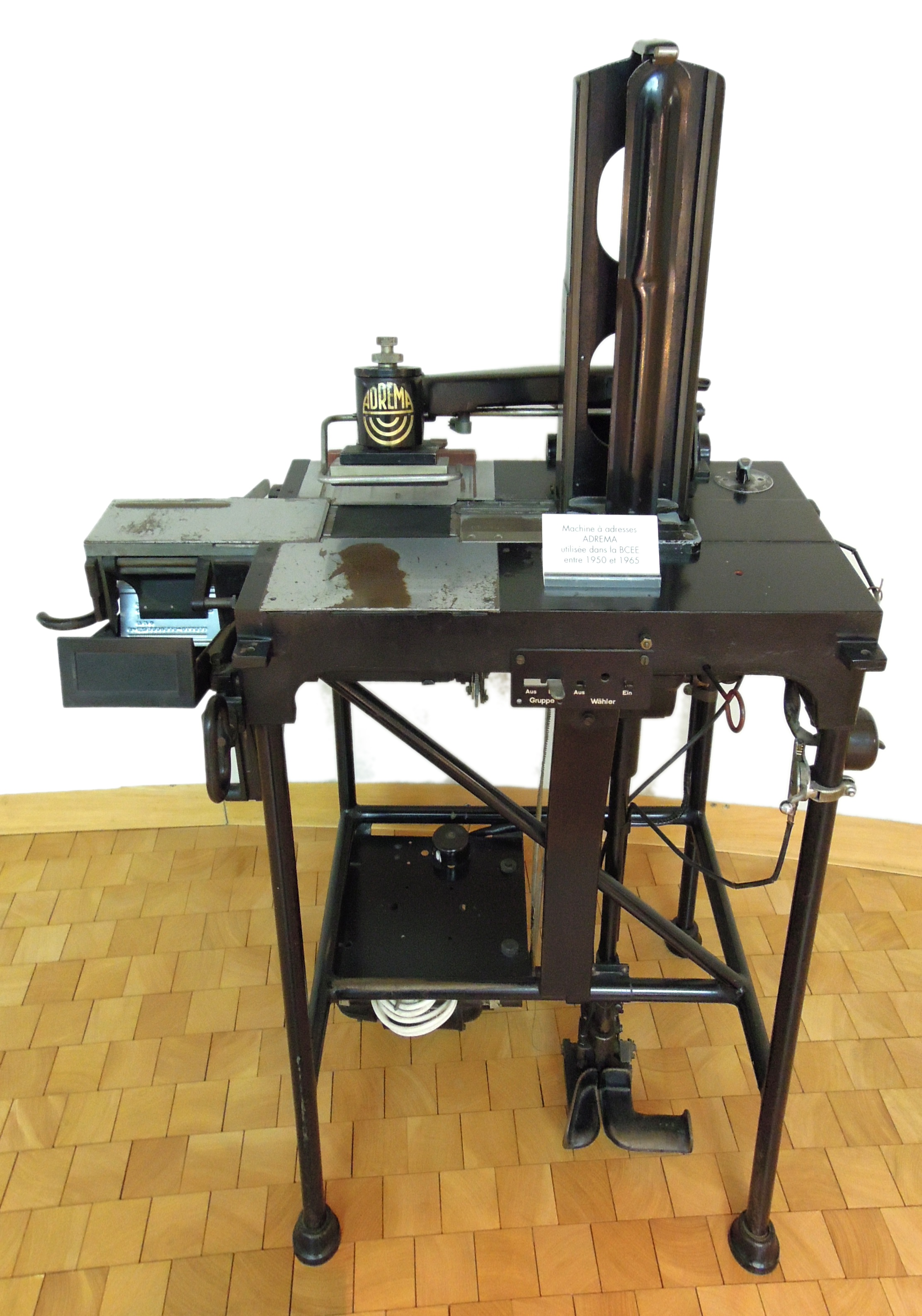
Addressograph, 1950

An addressograph is an address labeler and labeling system.

In 1896, the first U.S. patent for an addressing machine, the Addressograph was issued to Joseph Smith Duncan of Sioux City, Iowa. It was a development of the invention he had made in 1892. His earlier model consisted of a hexagonal wood block onto which he glued rubber type which had been torn from rubber stamps. While revolving, the block simultaneously inked the next name and address ready for the next impression. The "Baby O" model was put into production on July 26, 1893, in a small back room of the old Caxton Building in Chicago, Illinois.

The original company which manufactured the Addressograph, Addressograph International, merged in 1932 with American Multigraph of Cleveland, Ohio, to form the Addressograph-Multigraph Corporation manufacturing highly efficient addressograph and duplicating machines. In 1978 the corporate headquarters moved from Cleveland to Los Angeles, California, and the corporation name changed in 1979 to AM International, later AM Jacquard Systems (after acquiring Jacquard Systems). In 1982, the firm filed for bankruptcy under Chapter 11.

An Addressograph system of the 1960s was essentially a Graphotype debossing machine for preparing address plates, a cassette-style plate feeder, a heavy-duty, rapidly moving inked ribbon, a platten for hand-feeding the mail piece, and a foot pedal for stamping the address. The individual steel address plates were inserted into card-sized frames which had a series of slots along the top where colored metal flags could also be inserted for sorting purposes. The plate assemblies were placed in steel cassettes resembling library card catalogue drawers, which were manually inserted into the machine. At the press of the foot pedal, the plate assemblies were swapped in sequence in a similar fashion to a slide projector, placing an impression of the raised type onto the mail piece.

Addressograph was one of the comparator companies in the book Good to Great.

An Addressograph was used by the artist Jean Tinguely in his famous Homage to New York (1960) machine performance.

== Patents ==
- US PAT No. 8,175 -- Printing addresses
- US PAT No. 17,194 -- Machine for directing newspapers
- US PAT No. 21,429 -- Addressing machine
- US PAT No. 23,787 -- Addressing machine
- US PAT No. 25,319 -- Machine for addressing newspapers
- US PAT No. 558,936 -- Addressograph
