= Samsung Ativ Tab 5 =

Windows 8 tablet by Samsung

- Codename: XE500T1C
- Manufacturer: Samsung Electronics
- Product family: Ativ
- Type: Tablet PC
- Released: 26 October 2012 (United Kingdom)
- Operating system: Windows 8, upgradeable to Windows 8.1
- CPU: 1.8 GHz dual-core Intel Atom Z2760 processor
- Memory: 2 GB
- Storage: 64/128 GB solid-state drive (expandable with an external SD card)
- Display: 1366×768 px IPS display
- Graphics: PowerVR SGX545
- Input: Multi-touch screen S-Pen (rebranded Wacom active stylus)
- Camera: 8.0 MP AF camera with LED flash, 2.0 MP front facing (for video calls)
- Connectivity: Wi-Fi 802.11a/b/g/n, Bluetooth, micro-HDMI, Bluetooth 4.0, NFC
- Power: 8,200 mAh battery
- Related: Samsung Ativ Tab; Samsung Ativ Tab 3 Samsung Ativ Tab 7
- Website: www.samsung.com/us/computer/pcs/XE500T1C-K02US

The Samsung Ativ Tab 5, previously known as the Samsung Ativ Smart PC, is a 11.6-inch (29 cm) tablet manufactured by Samsung. The Ativ Tab 5 was announced on August 29, 2012, at IFA 2012 in Berlin, incorporates a dual-core 1.8 GHz Intel Atom Z2760 processor, and runs the Windows 8 operating system.

The incorporation of Windows 8 has received mostly favourable reviews. Also the Ativ Tab 5 itself received positive reviews for its lightweight design, inclusion of S-Pen, and its overall performance for a device positioned as a budget device.

== Hardware ==
The design of the Ativ Tab 5 is relatively similar to its smaller Android-based counterparts (such as the Galaxy Tab 2 10.1 and the Galaxy Note 10.1)—built using a mixture of plastic and glass. A micro HDMI port, MicroSD slot, and a full-size USB port are incorporated into the design, as well as a volume rocker, power button, and headphone jack located on the top. A physical Windows button is located directly below the screen. A charging port and dock connector are located on the bottom. The Ativ Tab 5 uses a 11.6-inch (29 cm) IPS display at a resolution of 1366x768. The tablet is available with either 64 or 128 GB of internal storage (in form of a solid-state drive), expandable via an external microSD card.

== Reception ==
Whilst demoing the device at the IFA 2012, TechRadar praised the Ativ Tab 5's Windows 8 operating system, lightweight design, and the ability to expand its functionality and storage with its S-Pen and attachable keyboard. However, it was also said though that there is a minimal amount of USB ports which was due to its slim design which was seen as similar only to that of its Android counterparts. Overall they deemed the device as a greatly underpowered but overtly overpriced compared to the competition.

CNET said that not having the lightning speeds of processors such as the Intel i5, the Ativ Tab 5 performs sluggishly, sometimes even in basic tasks for a mid-end Windows 8 tablet. The tablet's battery life, S-Pen, and lightweight design were regarded as positive aspects—despite considering the design itself to be merely cheap and easily smudges. The Intel Z2760 chipset used in the Ativ Tab 5 was also judged as a mediocre processor for the device noting that its performance was laggy and irresponsive at times in comparison to the chipsets used in competing Windows 8 devices. Over-all they viewed the Ativ Tab 5 as tablet with a Surface RT specs and Surface Pro price.

== See also ==
- List of Windows 8 devices
- Samsung Ativ
