= Samsung Ativ Tab 7 =

Windows 8 tablet by Samsung

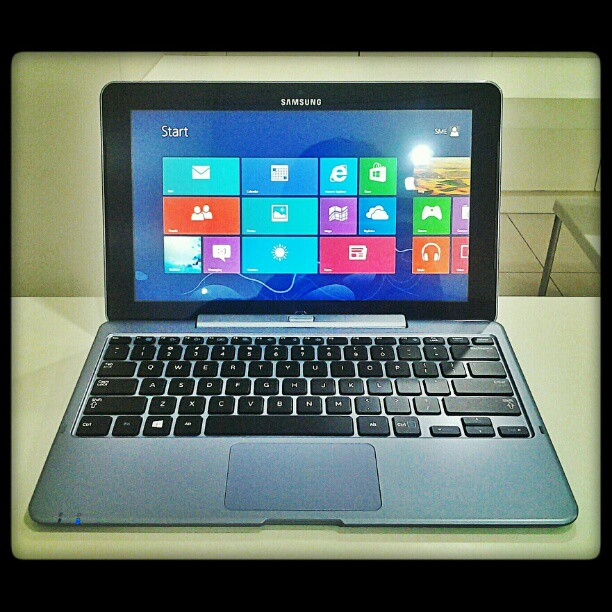
- Codename: XE700T1C
- Developer: Samsung Electronics
- Manufacturer: Samsung Electronics
- Product family: Ativ
- Type: Tablet PC
- Released: 26 October 2012 (United Kingdom)
- Operating system: Windows 8
- CPU: 1.8-2.7 GHz dual-core Intel Core i5 - 3337U processor
- Memory: 4 GB
- Storage: 128/256 GB flash memory (expandable with an external sd card)
- Display: 11.6 inch, 1920×1080 px LED Full HD display
- Graphics: Intel HD Graphics 4000
- Input: Multi-touch screen
- Camera: 5.0 MP AF camera with LED flash, 2.0 MP front facing (for video calls)
- Connectivity: Wi-Fi 802.11a/b/g/n, Bluetooth 4.0, HDMI (external cable), NFC
- Power: 4,080 mAh battery
- Predecessor: Samsung Series 7 Slate (XE700T1A)
- Related: Samsung Ativ Tab; Samsung Ativ Tab 3 Samsung Ativ Tab 5
- Website: web.archive.org/web/20140220191332/http://www.samsung.com/us/computer/pcs/XE700T1C-K01US

The Samsung Ativ Tab 7, XE700T1C or previously known as Samsung Ativ Smart PC Pro, is a 11.6-inch (29 cm) tablet manufactured by Samsung. The Ativ Tab 7 was announced on August 29, 2012 at IFA 2012 in Berlin, incorporates a dual-core 1.8 GHz Intel Core i5 - 3337U processor, and runs the Windows 8 operating system.

The incorporation of Windows 8 has received mostly favourable reviews. Also the Ativ Tab 7 itself received positive reviews for its lightweight design, inclusion of S-Pen, and its overall performance for a device positioned as a high-end device.

== Hardware ==
The design of the Ativ Tab 7 is relatively similar to its smaller Android-based counterparts (such as the Galaxy Tab 2 10.1 and the Galaxy Note 10.1)—built using a mixture of plastic and glass. A micro HDMI port, MicroSD slot, and a full-size USB port are incorporated into the design, as well as a volume rocker, power button, and headphone jack located on the top. A physical Windows button is located directly below the screen. A charging port and dock connector are located on the bottom. The Ativ Tab 7 uses a 11.6-inch (29 cm) LED Full HD display at a resolution of 1920x1080. The tablet is available with either 128 or 256 GB of internal storage which is expandable via an external micro-sd card.

== Reception ==
At IFA 2012, TechRadar praised the Ativ Tab 7's Windows 8 operating system, lightweight design, and the ability to expand its functionality and storage with its S-Pen and attachable keyboard. It was also said that there is a plenty amount of USB ports which was even doubled with the attachment of the removable keyboard. Overall they deemed the device as one of the best Windows 8 transformer tablets around.

CNET said that the Ativ Tab 7 performs well, most of the time as docked into the removable keyboard. The tablet's battery life, numerous USB ports, and the pre-installed Samsung software were regarded as positive aspects—despite considering the design itself to be merely cheap and unusual. The Intel chipset used in the Ativ Tab 7 was also judged as a great for the device noting that its performance was fast and very responsive most of the time in comparison to the chipsets used in competing Windows 8 devices. Over-all they viewed the Ativ tab 7 as more of an overpriced and confused Windows 8 ultrabook that is detachable and is better off with a keyboard as it is best left like that.

== See also ==
- List of Windows 8 devices
- Samsung Ativ
