= Samsung Notebook 9 =

Range of laptop computers

Notebook 9 / Series 9 / ATIV Book 9

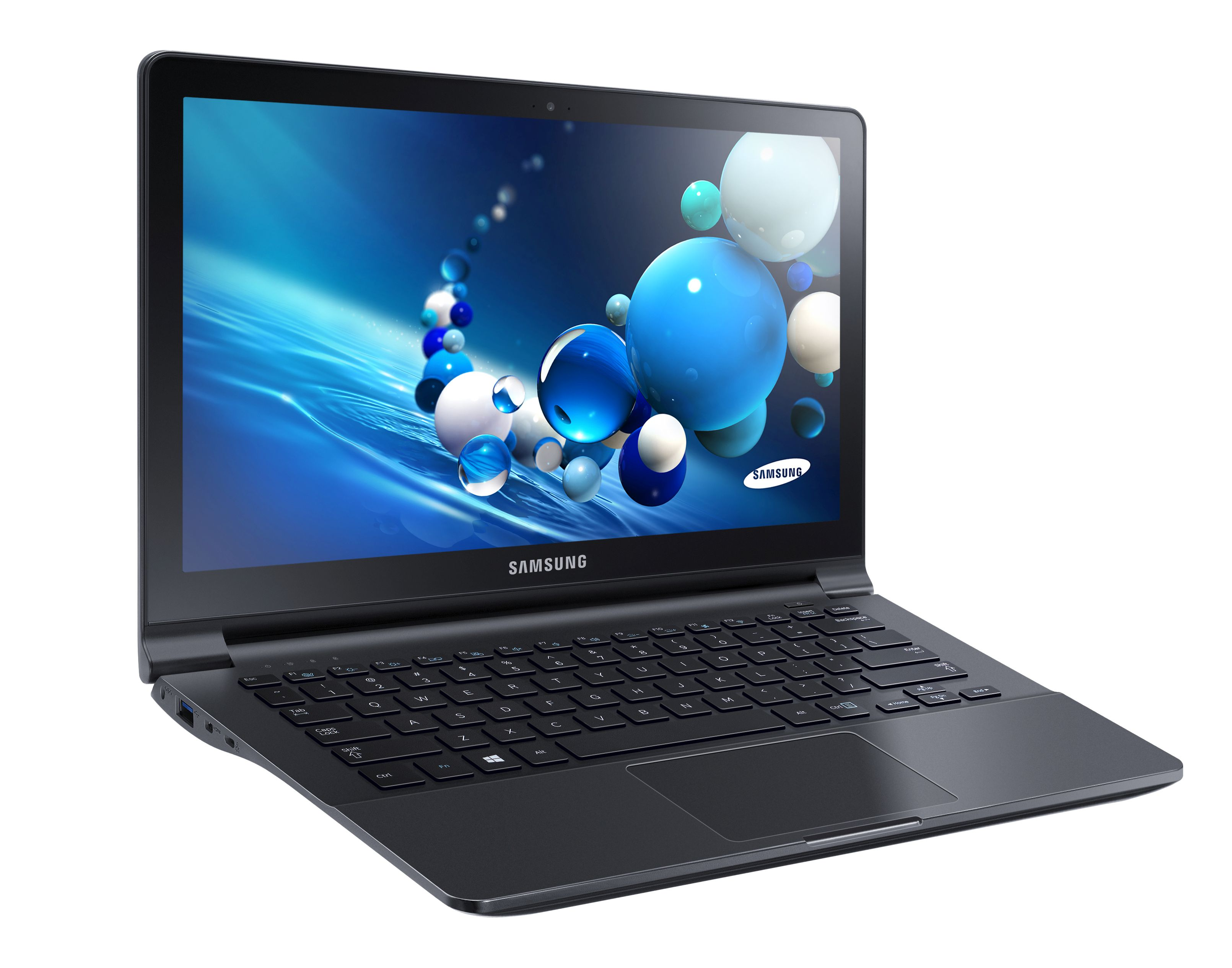
- Samsung ATIV Book 9 Plus (13")
- Also known as: Samsung SENS Series 9 Samsung Notebook Series 9 Samsung Ativ Book 9
- Manufacturer: Samsung Electronics
- Product family: Samsung Notebook, Samsung Ativ (formerly)
- Type: Laptop/Notebook
- Released: February 17, 2011
- Lifespan: 2011—2022
- Operating system: Windows 7 (upgradable to Windows 10)
- Successor: Samsung Galaxy Book Ion; Samsung Galaxy Book Flex
- Related: Samsung Notebook 7 Samsung Notebook 5

The Samsung Notebook 9, formerly marketed as Samsung Notebook Series 9 and Samsung ATIV Book 9, is a series of notebook computers from Samsung Electronics, as part of its Samsung Notebook line and formerly under the Ativ line, first launched in 2011 and its latest model released in 2019.

The Notebook 9 was the flagship laptop product of Samsung until being superseded by Samsung Galaxy Book (Flex and Ion models) in 2020. The original Series 9 from 2011 was designed with performance and portability in mind and notable for its "ultrathin" thickness; it and its successors were among the thinnest laptops in the world. The series underwent numerous revisions and extra models such as the Spin (a convertible) and Pen (with digitizer for pen computing) as well as Lite, Plus, Style and Pro.

== History and models ==
=== First generation: 2011 ===

The Samsung Notebook Series 9 (known as SENS Series 9 in South Korea) was introduced on January 6, 2011 at the Consumer Electronics Show (CES) and won the Best of CES award in the Laptop category. It featured the world's first enclosure that is made out of aerospace grade duralumin with 16.3 mm (0.64 in) thickness and 1.31 kg (2.89 lb) in weight; it had a Sandy Bridge Intel Core i5 processor, 128GB (Note: In this article, the conventional prefixes for computer storage denote base-10 values whereby "kilobyte" (KB) = 10^{3} bytes, "megabyte" (MB) = 10^{6} bytes and "gigabyte" (GB) = 10^{9} bytes.) solid-state drive (SSD) and a 13.3" HD (1366 x 768) display with 300 nit of brightness. The Series 9 notebook went on sale in South Korea in February 2011 for a price of 24,90,000 won, and launched in March globally.

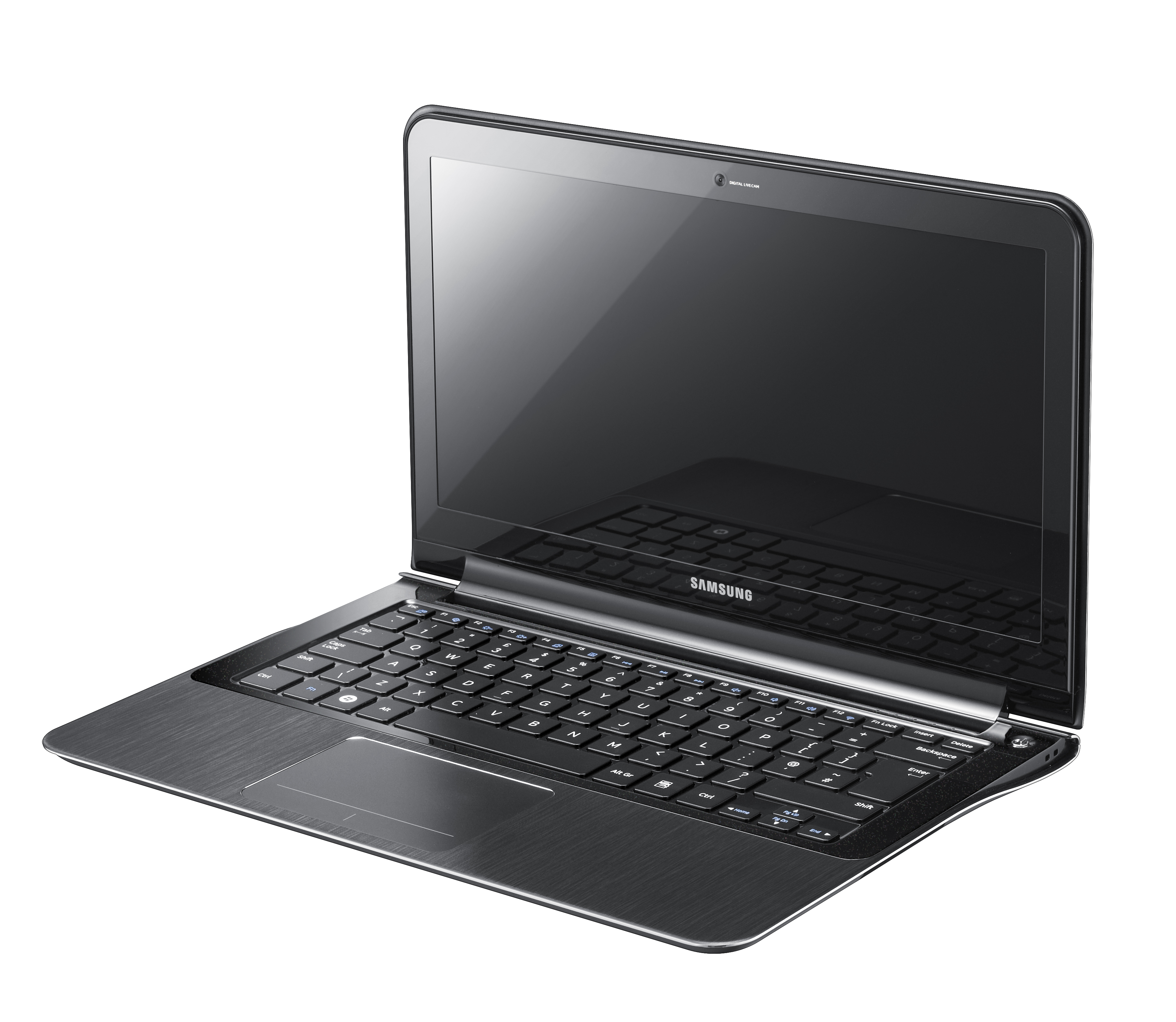
1st generation Samsung Series 9

On May 4, 2011, Samsung also introduced 11.6" display version of the Series 9 in the Korean market and later abroad. It had the same design identity, specification and exterior material as the 13.3" model except the display size and CPU of Intel Core i3-380UM. The thickness remained the same but the weight was lighter at 1.06 kg (2.34 lb). Two months later, an updated CPU version with Intel Core i5-2537M was introduced to the Korean market to test the market perception of a smaller screen laptop. The original intention was to compete against MacBook Air line up with same screen size models, but due to sluggish demand of smaller screen size model, the 11-inch model was ceased by the end of the year. Newly developed 15-inch model superseded the 11-inch model in order to meet the larger-screen preference of the Korean market and later, it was introduced worldwide.

A special edition was also released later: Moonlight Blue and Luxury Rose Gold.

=== Second generation: 2012 ===
The second generation Notebook Series 9 was announced to the public at the CES on January 8, 2012. The new model had same display size of 13.3" but the resolution was stepped up from HD (1366 x 768) to HD+ (1600 x 900) and the brightness was increased from 300 nit to 400 nit. Design was refined with a reduced footprint and a different hinge design consisting of two hinges left and right. Also the material of the enclosure was changed from duralumin to aluminium single-shell body. Subsequently, the weight was reduced from 1.31 kg (2.89 lb) to 1.13 kg (2.49 lb) and the thickness was reduced from 16.3 mm (0.64 in) to 12.9 mm (0.51 in).

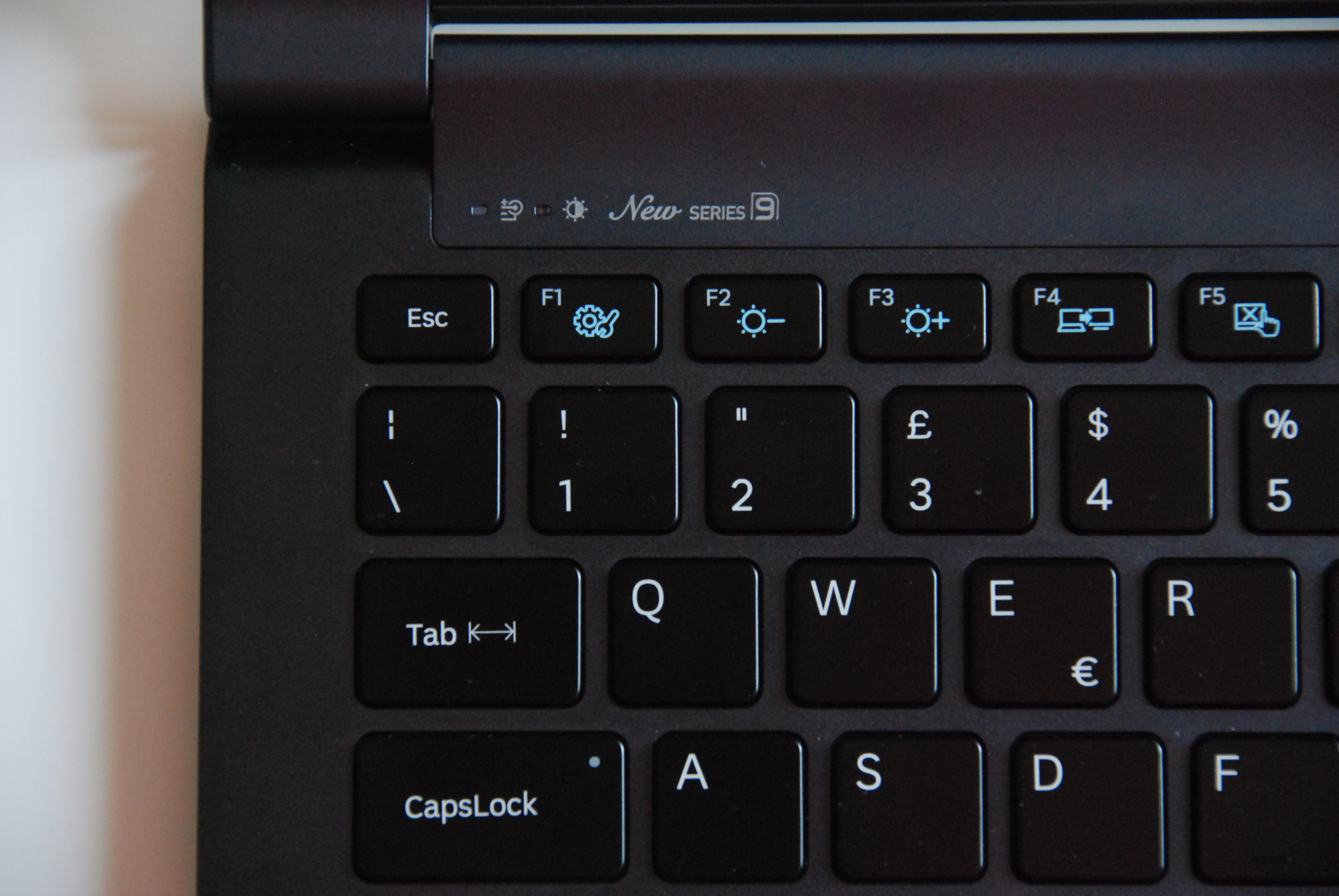
'New Series 9' wordmark above the keyboard of the second generation Samsung Series 9

The user was offered a choice of 128GB SSD as well as larger 256GB SSD for the storage. It was introduced with Sandy Bridge Intel Core i5 processor at the CE Show but 3 months later, it was upgraded to the Ivy Bridge Intel Core i5 processor before the hitting the market. Despite its design fitting well in Intel's Ultrabook category, Samsung chose not to market the Series 9 notebook as an Ultrabook.

In March 2012, the 15.0" display version of the Series 9 was announced to the market with HD+ resolution display. It had same specification as its 13.3" counterpart but introduced to the market with Ivy Bridge Intel Core i5 processor from the beginning. The Magnesium enclosure version was also introduced in July 2012.

=== Third generation: 2013 Book 9, Plus, Lite ===
Ativ Book 9 wordmark

At CES 2013, a white Series 9 was presented but without further details (whilst the Series 7 Chronos and Ultra were updated with full HD screens). Eventually on March 28, 2013, the new Series 9 was announced with its 13.3" displays upgraded from HD+ to FHD (1920 x 1080). Around the same time, Samsung decided to rebrand all of its computer lines to ATIV and consequently, Series 9 became ATIV Book 9.

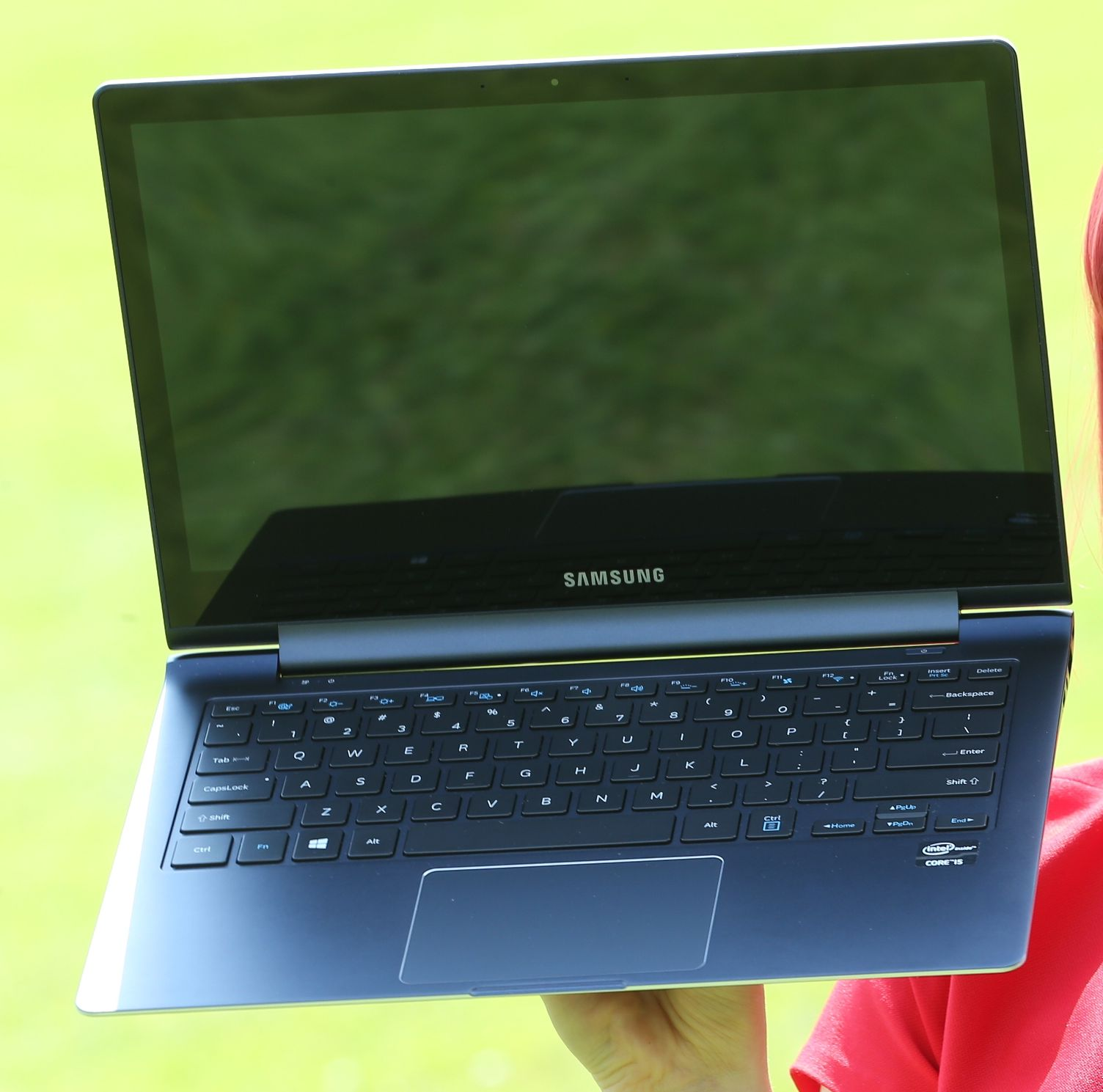
ATIV Book 9 Plus, 15 inch

On June 20, 2013, during the "Samsung Premiere 2013: Galaxy & ATIV" event in London, ATIV Book 9 Plus and ATIV Book 9 Lite was introduced to public. Book 9 Plus featured Haswell Intel Core i5 processor and 13.3" qHD+ (3200 x 1800) resolution display with touchscreen panel. Although it was equipped with qHD+ display, initial advertisement showed it as having FHD resolution display due to lack of qHD+ driver support of Windows 8. This issue has been resolved with the arrival of Windows 8.1 and all Book 9 Plus models had the option to choose qHD+ resolution once 8.1 was installed even though the previous advertisement showed FHD in its specification.

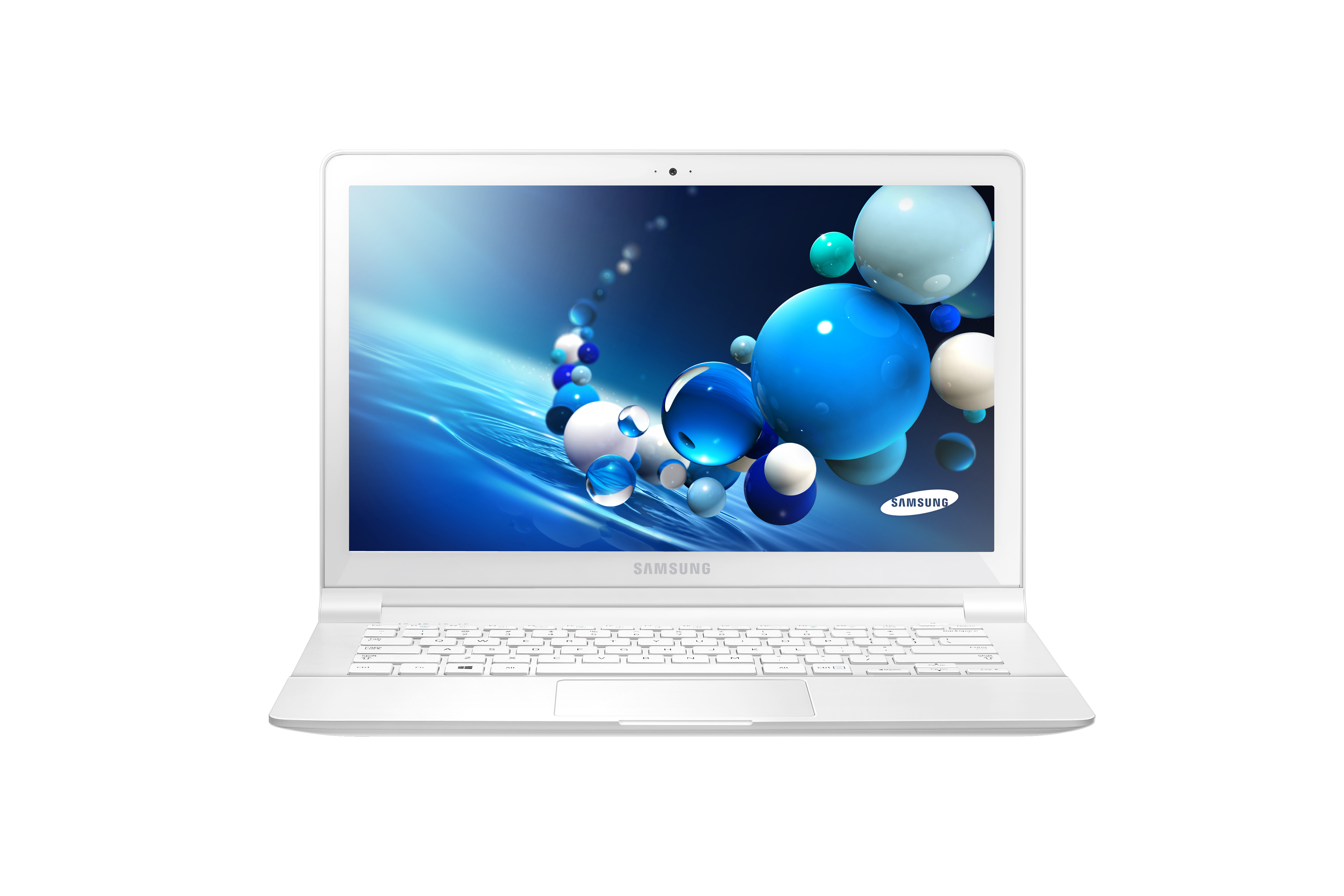
ATIV Book 9 Lite in 'Marble White'

Meanwhile, the Book 9 Lite has a plastic enclosure but it still retains the "Thin & Light" design identity of Book 9 family. It is equipped with AMD quad-core A6-1450 APU with Radeon HD8250 GPU and HD resolution 13.3" display. The performance of the APU was relatively low but the overall speed was compensated by the SSD. It was marketed toward casual computer users who mainly use the device for web browsing and email checking, not computation-intensive application users.

=== 2014 edition ===
On January 7, 2014, Samsung Electronics announced the new ATIV Book 9 2014 Edition at CES 2014. The screen size was increased from 15.0" to 15.6" from the previous 15 inch Book 9 and the resolution was upgraded from HD to FHD as well. It was announced as the world's first laptop PC to have native lossless audio up to 24bit/192 kHz, such as FLAC and ALAC, playback feature. Due to 48 kHz audio playback limitation of the Windows operating system, a dedicated lossless audio player software, S Player+, was also developed and shipped with the product. It also marketed as having the longest battery running time of 14 hours in 15-inch class laptop computers.

Two months later, ATIV Book 9 Style, another 15 inch Book 9, was announced. It had a similar design and specification as Book 9 2014 Edition, except having plastic enclosure and lack of lossless sound playback feature. However, it was equipped with two powerful speakers with 4W of output each. Also the exterior has leather-like texture finish with faux stitch design on the edge of the computer.

All the new Book 9 models that were announced in 2014 include new features such as high current USB port for tablet charging, AptX codec for high quality audio transmission over Bluetooth, Dolby Virtual 5.1 surround sound effect and remote controllable audio port. The 2014 Edition Book 9 was the last in the series to be released in Europe, following Samsung's late 2014 announcement that it is exiting that market.

=== 2015: fanless Book 9 ===
The new ATIV Book 9 announced in January 2015 switched to a low-power Intel Core M 5Y10c processor, allowing it to be fanless, and slimmer and lighter than before. It was 0.46 inches thin and weighed 2.06 lbs. This new model featured a smaller, 12-inch display and WQXGA (2560x1600) resolution. It ran on Windows 8.1 and included the typical Samsung bundled applications like SideSync, S Agent and S Player.

=== 2016: Notebook 9, Spin, Pro ===
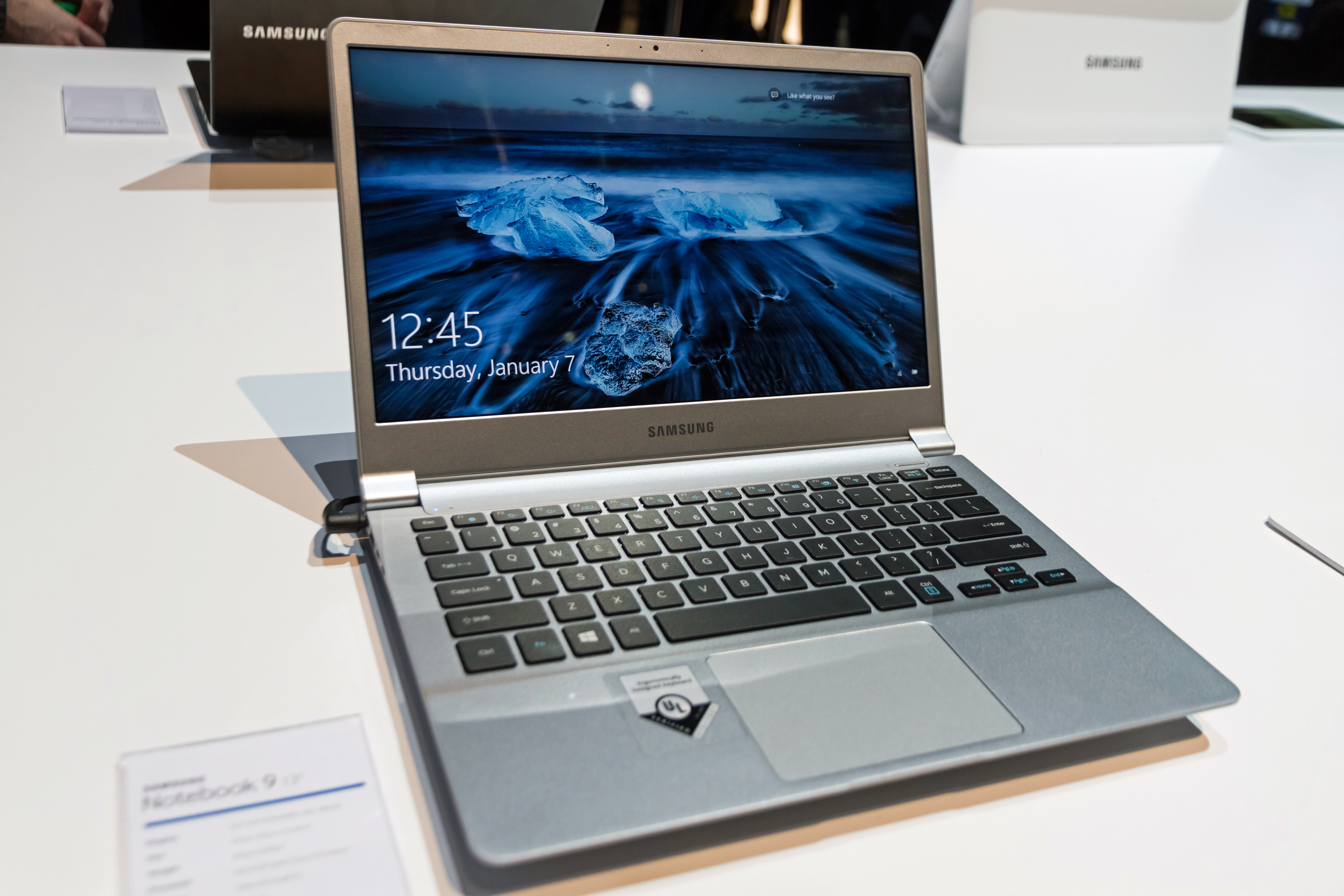
The Samsung Notebook 9 at CES 2016

At the end of 2015, the ATIV Book 9 Pro and Book 9 Spin were introduced (also known as Samsung Notebook 9 in some regions), both running on an Intel Core i7 processor. The Notebook 9 Pro features a 4K resolution display, while the Notebook 9 Spin is a 360-degree convertible. Then at CES 2016, the Samsung Notebook 9 was introduced. The 13.3-inch version of Notebook 9 weighs 0.84 kg and the 15-inch version weighs 1.29 kg. Both feature a Skylake (6th generation) Intel Core processor, marking a departure from the Core M used in 2015's ATIV Book 9. The 15-inch version also features a USB-C port.

=== 2017 and later: Notebook 9, Pen, Pro ===
The 2017 edition of Samsung Notebook 9 came with a Kaby Lake (7th generation) Intel Core processor. The computer was claimed by the company to be the world's lightest 13-inch laptop at just 1.8 lbs / 820 g. Despite its size, it retains a full size HDMI port. The 15-inch variant came an Nvidia GTX 940MX graphics chip.

Also in 2017, a new Notebook 9 Pro was released, also running on 7th generation Intel Core and bundled with an S Pen.

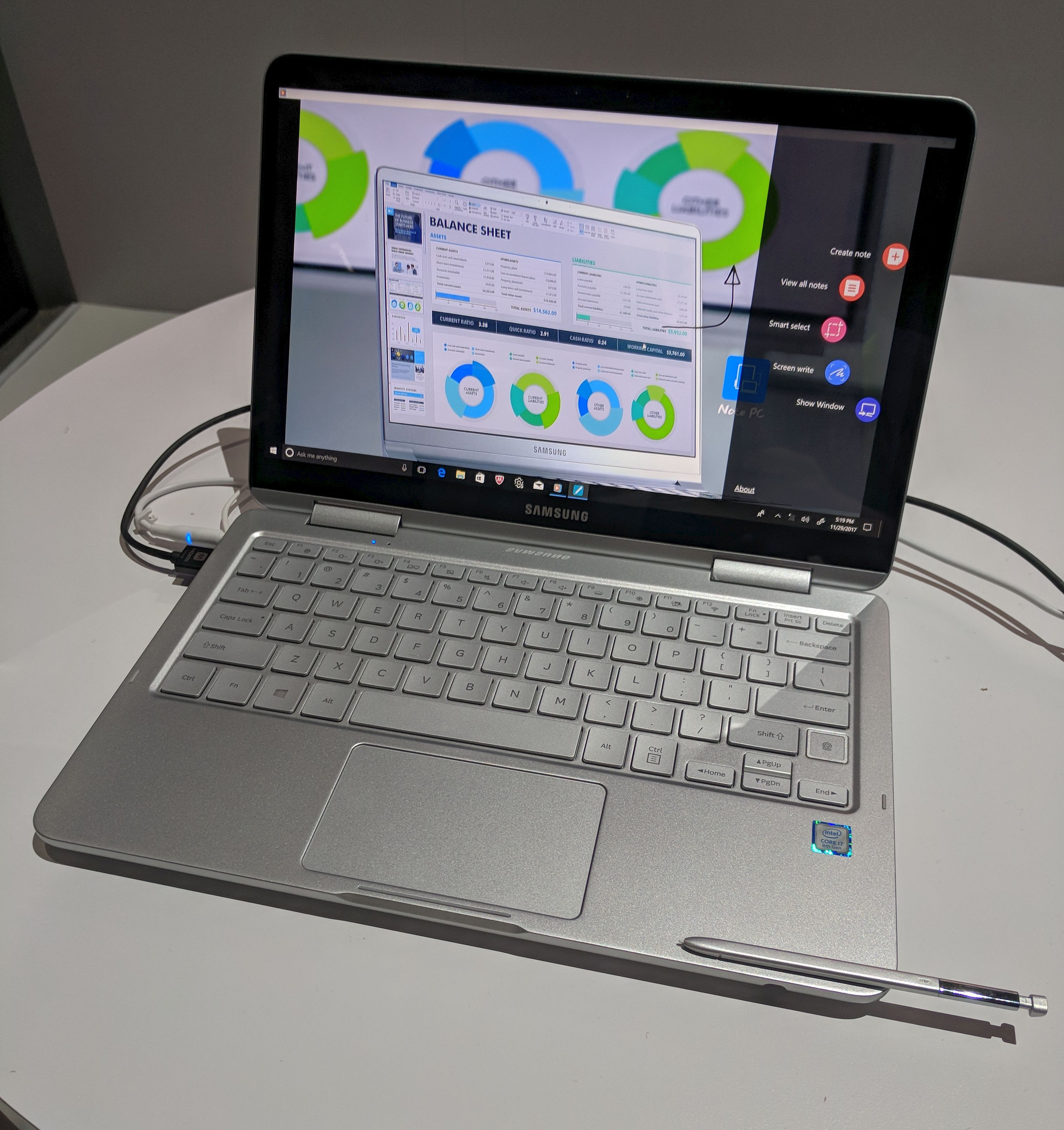
Samsung Notebook 9 Pen (2018) with its S Pen stylus

In 2018 another new Notebook 9 was released running on 8th generation Intel Core, alongside the Notebook 9 Pen compatible with the S Pen. Both these 2018 Notebook 9 models are made of magnesium-aluminum alloy ("Metal12"), which Samsung also claimed makes it more durable than its predecessors.

2019 editions of Notebook 9 Pen were released in 13" and 15" forms, and a new Notebook 9 Pro was also launched, with a revised aluminium body Later in 2019, Samsung introduced the Galaxy Book Flex and Galaxy Book Ion, effectively the successors of Notebook 9 Pen and Notebook 9 Pro respectively. These models were released in 2020 and also marked Samsung's return to selected European markets.

== Design ==
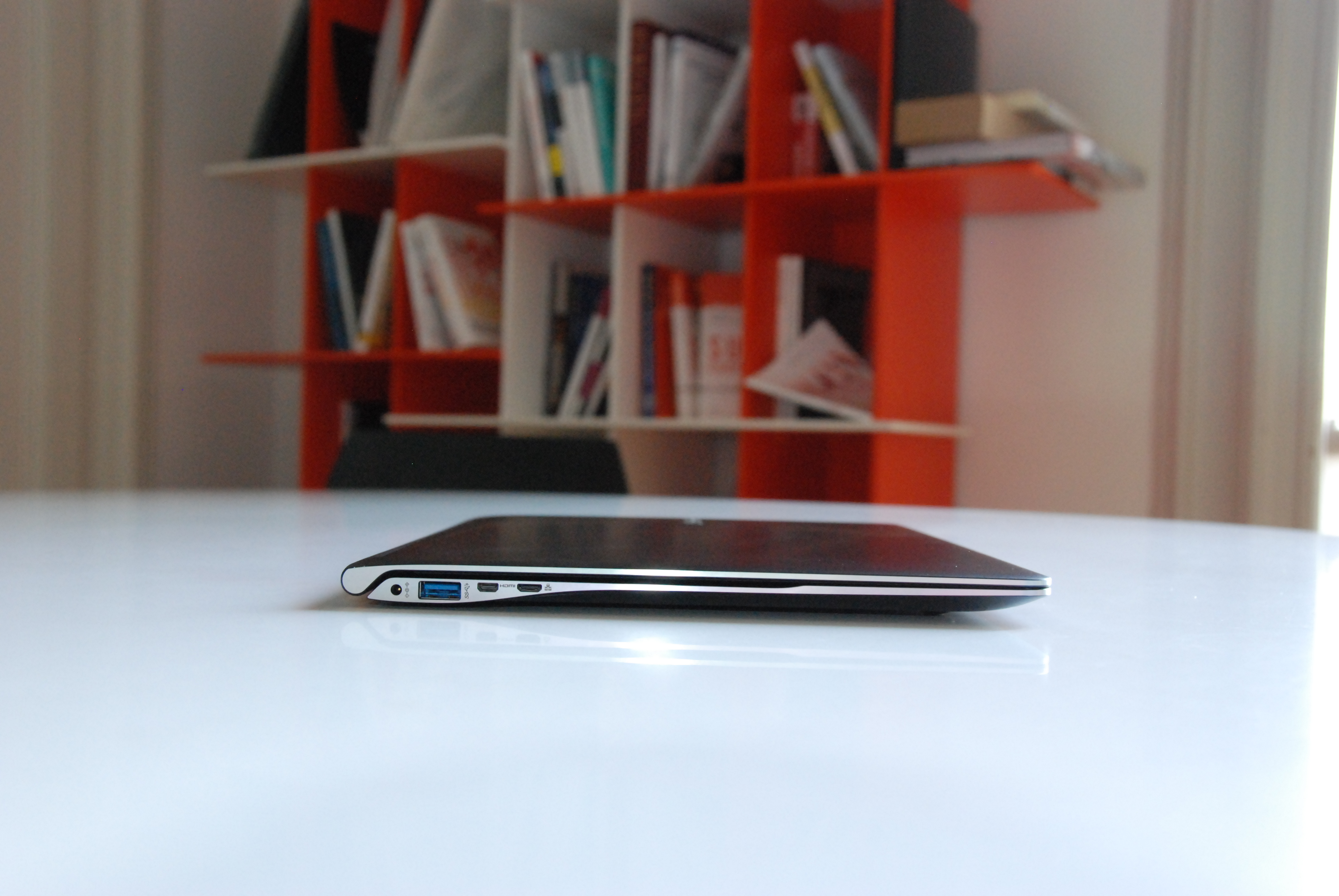
Side view of the second generation (aluminium) Notebook Series 9 from 2012

The original main design philosophy of the Notebook 9 is "Thin & Light" and the design motive came from bent sheet of a paper to hint its thin and lightness. In order to make the (original) product durable while maintaining the light weight, aerospace grade duralumin was chosen for enclosure. Byeongyong Song (principal designer at Samsung), Yeowan Yun (principal designer of ITS Design) and Jinie Ryu (senior designer at Samsung) are recognized as the designers of the original Series 9 notebook.

The design philosophy and the motive remained the same during the second and third iteration of the design but the material was changed to aluminium due to better manufacturability and easiness of putting fine details. The original's black brushed chassis colour was also changed to a matte dark blue. Later, a magnesium variant was also added to offer an even lighter option.

The first plastic enclosure version with 13-inch screen, Ativ Book 9 Lite, was added to the line up in 2013. It had similar design identity with other models in the line up but configured to have low cost CPU with plastic exterior in order to meet the demand from those who preferred the sleek design of Book 9 yet conscious about budget.

== Awards ==
- 2020 iF Design Award (Notebook 9 Pro)
- 2017 Red Dot Design Award
- 2017 TechRadar Editor's Choice Award (Notebook 9 Pro)
- 2015 iF Design Award
- 2014 Consumer Reports #1 Rank in 15-16 inch Laptop Category
- 2014 PC Magazine Reader's Choice Award (Samsung laptops)
- 2013 iF Design Award
- 2012 iF Design Award
- 2012 Good Design Award
- 2011 DFA (Design For Asia) Award 'Bronze' prize
- 2011 IDEA Design Award - Final List
- 2011 CES Innovation Awards
- 2011 TCO Design Award

== Specifications and comparison ==
=== 13-inch models ===
13-inch models
Name	Samsung Notebook Series 9 (Samsung Sens Series 9 in South Korea)	Samsung Notebook Series 9			Samsung Notebook Series 9, later Samsung Ativ Book 9	Samsung Ativ Book 9					Samsung Ativ Book 9, later Samsung Notebook 9	Samsung Notebook 9					
9 model	—N/a	—N/a	—N/a	—N/a	—N/a	—N/a	Lite	Plus	Lite	—N/a	Spin	—N/a	—N/a	Pro	—N/a	Pen	Pen
Release date	3/4/2011	2/16/2012	5/9/2012	7/30/2012	3/17/2013	6/4/2013	7/27/2013	8/22/2013	1/6/2014	1/9/2014	11/2015	1/2016	1/2017	6/2017	1/2018	1/2018	1/2019
Model No. (NP)	900X3A	900X3B	900X3C	900X3D	900X3E	900X3F	905S3G	940X3G	910S3G	900X3G	940X3L	900X3L	900X3N	940X3N	900X3T	930QAA	930SBE; 930MBE
Processor	Intel Core i5-2537M	Intel Core i5-2467M		Intel Core i5-3317U	Intel Core i7-3537U	Intel Core i5-3337U	AMD A6-1450	Intel Core i5-4200U	Intel Core i3-4020Y	Intel Core i5-4200U	Intel Core i7-6500U		Intel Core i5/i7 7th gen	Intel Core i7, 7th gen	Intel Core i5/i7 8th gen	Intel Core i7	Intel Core, 8th gen
Graphics	Intel HD 3000			Intel HD 4000			AMD Radeon HD 8250	Intel HD 4400	Intel HD 4200	Intel HD 4400						Intel UHD 620	Intel UHD 630
Display	13.3", 1366 x 768, Anti Reflective	13.3", 1600 x 900, 400nit, Anti Reflective			13.3", 1920 x 1080, 300nit, Anti Reflective		13.3", 1366 x 768, Anti Reflective	13.3", 3200 x 1800, 350nit, Anti Reflective, Touch Screen	13.3", 1366 x 768, Anti Reflective	13.3", 1920 x 1080, 300nit, Anti Reflective	13.3"			13.3"		13.3", 1920 x 1080	13.3", 1920 x 1080
Memory	4GB DDR3 at 1333 MHz			4GB DDR3 at 1600 MHz			4GB DDR3L at 1066 MHz	4GB DDR3L at 1600 MHz		8GB DDR3L at 1600 MHz		4GB to 8GB		8GB		8GB	
Storage	128GB SSD											128GB or 256GB SSD		256GB SSD			
Multimedia	1.5 W x 2 speaker, 1.3M HD Camera						1.5 W x 2 speaker, 720p HD Camera										
Wireless	802.11 b/g/n 2x2, BT3.0			802.11 a/b/g/n 2x2, BT4.0			802.11 b/g/n 1x1, BT4.0	802.11 a/b/g/n 2x2, BT4.0	802.11 b/g/n 1x1, BT4.0	802.11 a/b/g/n/ac 2x2, BT4.0							
I/O Port	Micro HDMI, Headphone, Mic, 1 x USB 3.0, 1 x USB 2.0, Micro SD, Mini RJ45		Mini VGA, Micro HDMI, Headphone/Mic Combo, 1 x USB 3.0, 1 x USB 2.0, 3-in-1 card, Mini RJ45														
Input	82 Key, Touch Pad		81 Backlit Key, Touch Pad, ALS				81 Key, ClickPad	81 Backlit Key, Touch Pad, ALS	81 Key, ClickPad	81 Backlit Key, Touch Pad, ALS							
Power	40 Watt, 40 Wh Battery			40 Watt, 44 Wh Battery			40 Watt, 30 Wh Battery	40 Watt, 55 Wh Battery	40 Watt, 30 Wh Battery	40 Watt, 44 Wh Battery							
Specification	328.5 x 227.0 x 16.3mm, 1.31 kg	313.8 x 218.5 x 12.9mm, 1.31 kg		313.8 x 218.5 x 13.2mm, 1.13 kg			324.0 x 224.0 x 16.9mm, 1.44 kg	319.0 x 224.0 x 16.9mm, 1.44 kg	324.0 x 224.0 x 16.9mm, 1.44 kg	313.8 x 218.5 x 13.2mm, 1.13 kg		313.8 x 218.5 x 13.4mm, 0.84 kg	309.4 X 208 X 13.9mm, 0.82 kg				307.9 x 206.2 x 14.9-15.9 mm, 1.12 kg
Enclosure Material	Duralumin	Aluminium		Magnesium	Aluminium	Magnesium	Plastic (Black, White, Pink, Lime)	Aluminium	Plastic (Black, White, Pink, Lime)	Magnesium						Magnesium "Metal12"	Aluminium
OS	Windows 7 Home			Windows 8						Windows 8.1	Windows 10						

=== 11-inch, 12-inch and 15-inch models ===
11-inch, 12-inch and 15-inch models
Name	Samsung Notebook Series 9 (Samsung Sens Series 9 in South Korea)	Samsung Notebook Series 9				Samsung Ativ Book 9				Samsung Ativ Book 9, later Samsung Notebook 9	Samsung Notebook 9				
9 model	—N/a	—N/a	—N/a	—N/a	—N/a	Style	—N/a	—N/a	—N/a	Pro	—N/a	—N/a	Pro	—N/a	Pen
Release date	5/3/2011	7/10/2011	3/28/2012	5/4/2012	5/30/2012	3/2014	06/18/2014	06/18/2014	1/2015	11/2015	1/2016	1/2017	6/2017	1/2018	1/2019
Model No. (NP)	900X1A	900X1B	900X4B	900X4C	900X4D	910S5J	930X5J	910S5J	930X2K	940Z8L	900X5L	900X5N	940X5N	900X5T	950SBE
Processor	Intel Core i3 380UM	Intel Core i5-2537M	Intel Core i7-2637M	Intel Core i7-3517U	Intel Core i7-3317U	Intel Core i5	Intel Core i7-4500U	Intel Core i5-4200U	Intel Core M 5Y10c	Intel Core i7	Intel Core i7-6500U	Intel Core i5/i7 7th gen	Intel Core i7, 7th gen	Intel Core i5/i7 8th gen	Intel Core, 8th gen
Graphics	Intel GMA HD	Intel HD3000		Intel HD4000		Intel HD4400			Intel HD5300	Nvidia GeForce GTX 950M	Intel HD 520			Intel UHD 620, optional Nvidia GeForce MX150	NVIDIA GeForce MX150 2 GB
Display	11.6", 1366 x 768, 340nit, Anti Reflective		15.0", 1600 x 900, 400nit, Anti Reflective			15.6", 1920 x 1080	15.6", 1920 x 1080, 300nit, Anti Reflective		12.2", 2560 x 1600	15.6"	15.0", 1920 x 1080	15"	15"	15"	15.0", 1920 x 1080
Memory	2GB DDR3 at 1333 MHz		8GB DDR3 at 1333 MHz	8GB DDR3 at 1600 MHz	4GB DDR3 at 1600 MHz	4GB DDR3L at 1600 MHz	8GB DDR3L at 1600 MHz	4GB DDR3L at 1600 MHz	4GB LPDDR3 at 1600 MHz		4GB to 8GB	8GB to 16GB	16GB		
Storage	128GB SSD						256GB SSD	128GB SSD			128GB or 256GB SSD		256GB SSD		
Multimedia	1.5W x 2 speaker, 1.3M HD Camera		2W x 2 speaker, 1.3M HD Camera			4W x 2 speaker, 720p HD camera	2W x 2 speaker, WM5102 Lossless audio DAC, 720p HD camera	4W x 2 speaker, 720p HD camera							
Wireless	802.11 b/g/n 2x2, BT3.0		802.11 a/b/g/n 2x2, BT3.0	802.11 a/b/g/n 2x2, BT4.0		802.11 ac 2x2, BT4.0	802.11 ac 2x2, BT4.0	802.11 ac 1x1, BT4.0							
I/O Port	HDMI, Headphone, Mic, 1 x USB 3.0, 1 x USB 2.0, Micro SD, RJ45		Mini VGA, Micro HDMI, Headphone/Mic Combo, 2 x USB 3.0, 1 x USB 2.0, 3-in-1 card, Mini RJ45			Mini VGA, HDMI, Headphone/Mic Combo, 2 x USB 3.0, 1 x USB 2.0, 3-in-1 card, Mini RJ45									
Input	82 Key, Touch Pad		87 Key, Touch Pad	87 Backlit Key, ClickPad, ALS				87 Key, ClickPad							
Power	40Watt, 42Wh Battery		40Watt, 62Wh Battery					40Watt, 55Wh Battery							
Specification	298 x 197.5 x 16.5mm, 1.06 kg		356.9 x 237 x 14.9mm, 1.65 kg		356.9 x 237 x 14.9mm, 1.58 kg	374.3 x 249.9 x 17.5 mm, 1.95 kg	374.3 x 249.9 x 14.9mm, 1.78 kg	374.3 x 249.9 x 17.5mm, 1.95 kg	284.2 x 212.6 x 11.68mm, 0.948 kg		346.5 x 236.8 x 14.5,. 1.29 kg				347.9 x 229.1 x 16.9 mm, 1.56 kg
Enclosure Material	Duralumin		Aluminium		Magnesium	Plastic	Aluminium	Plastic	Aluminium					Magnesium "Metal12"	Aluminium
OS	Windows 7 Home		Windows 7 Pro	Windows 7 Home		Windows 8.1				Windows 10					

== Timeline of Notebook 9 ==
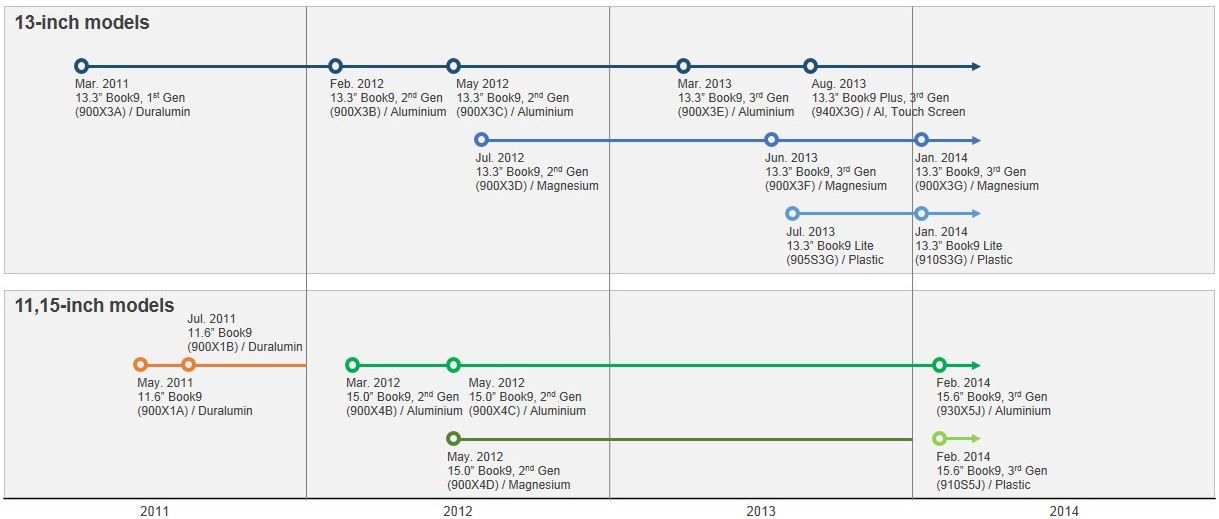
