= Samsung Galaxy Book series =

Laptops produced by Samsung Electronics

Samsung Galaxy Book

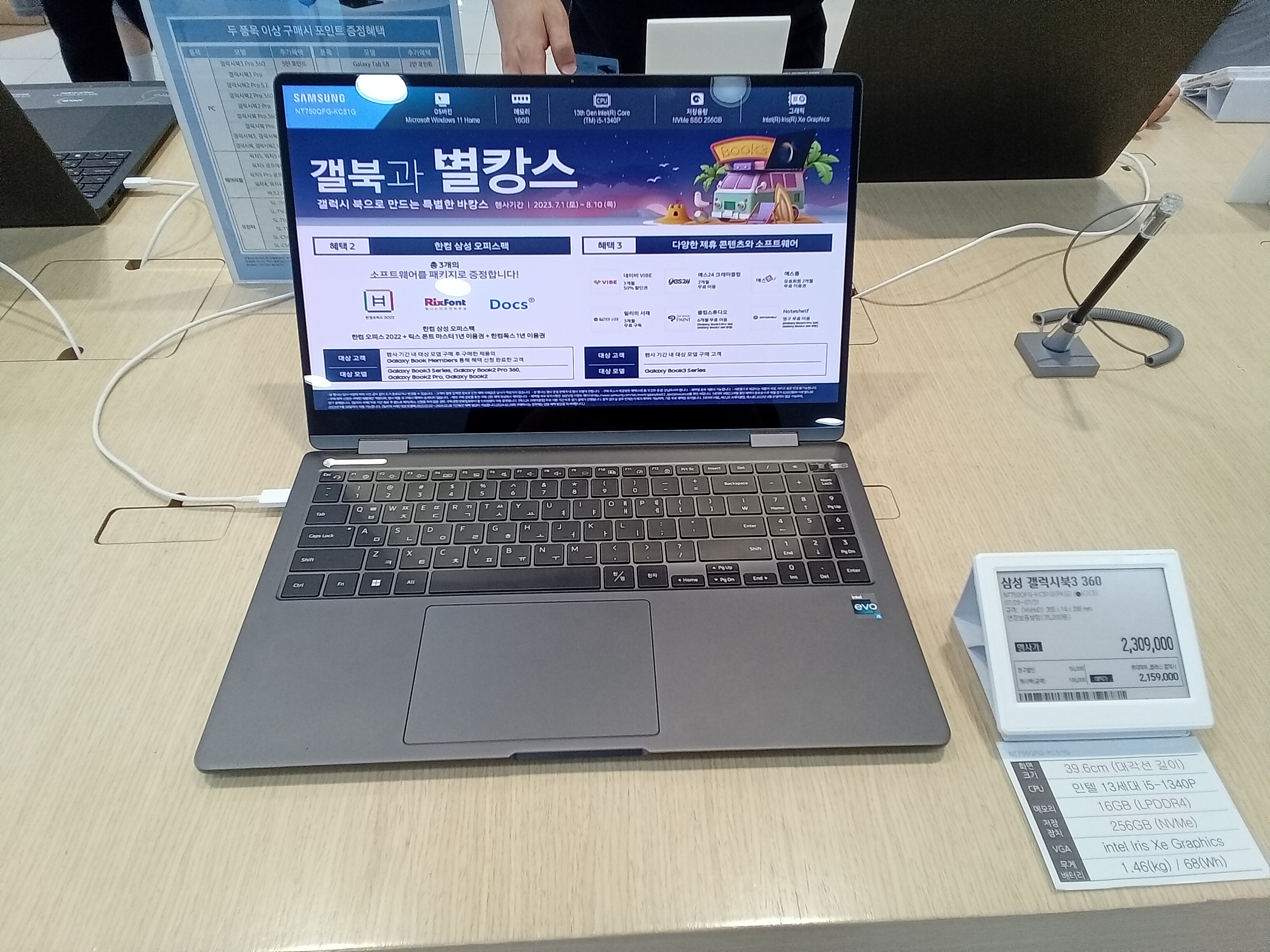
- Samsung Galaxy Book 3 360
- Developer: Samsung Electronics
- Manufacturer: Samsung Electronics
- Product family: Samsung Galaxy
- Type: Laptop, formerly tablet
- Released: 2016 (tablets); 2020 (laptops)
- Lifespan: 2016-2019 (tablets); 2020-present (laptops)
- Discontinued: 2019 (tablets)
- Operating system: Windows
- CPU: Intel / AMD (x86) Qualcomm (ARM)
- Graphics: AMD, Nvidia, Intel
- Marketing target: Consumer
- Predecessor: Samsung Ativ; Samsung Notebook

Samsung Galaxy Book is a line of consumer-oriented Microsoft Windows-based laptop computers produced and developed by Samsung Electronics of South Korea. The Galaxy Book brand originated with a series of tablet computers with detachable keyboards; however, beginning in 2020 the brand evolved into Samsung's main line of laptops, replacing the Samsung Notebook.

The Galaxy Book is a sub-brand of Samsung Galaxy, but unlike other Galaxy devices, it runs exclusively on Windows software. There is also a separate Galaxy Chromebook line, which is branded under Galaxy Chromebook rather than Galaxy Book.

== History ==
=== Tablet era (2016–2019) ===
The Samsung Galaxy Book line originated with the release of Galaxy TabPro S in 2016, a Windows-powered Intel Core M tablet with a detachable keyboard designed as a competitor to Microsoft's Surface Pro. It was the company's first Galaxy-branded device of any type to run Windows software instead of Android, replacing the Windows tablets that had been in the Samsung Ativ line.

A year later, the original Galaxy Book was launched as a detachable tablet available in 10.6-inch and 12-inch configurations with Intel Kaby Lake processors. In October 2018, Samsung announced the Galaxy Book 2, another detachable tablet that moved to the ARM-based Snapdragon 850 processor, offering built-in LTE connectivity and significantly longer battery life at the expense of processing performance compared to Intel-based competitors.

In August 2019, the Galaxy Book S was announced at Galaxy Unpacked in a standard laptop (clamshell) form factor, again using an ARM Snapdragon processor. In its press release, Samsung called the Book S the first release of the new Galaxy Computing line. The Book S marked a shift for the Galaxy Book brand from detachable tablets to traditional laptop form factors.

=== Transition to laptops (2019–2021) ===
In October 2019, Samsung announced the Galaxy Book Ion (clamshell) and Galaxy Book Flex (convertible) laptops. Both were Intel x86 computers and marked the replacement of the Samsung Notebook 9. They were the world's first laptops with QLED displays, and the Flex came bundled with an S Pen stylus.

Ahead of CES 2020, Samsung introduced the Galaxy Book Flex α (Alpha), a cheaper variant of the Flex. Both the Ion and Flex were released later in 2020. In May 2020, a variant of the Galaxy Book S running on the low-power Intel Lakefield processor was unveiled, which Samsung described as a "hybrid processor". At the end of 2020, the successors Samsung Galaxy Book Ion2 and Flex2 were announced as part of the 2021 lineup.

At Samsung's Unpacked 2021 event in April, several new models were unveiled: the Galaxy Book Odyssey, a gaming laptop (successor to the Notebook Odyssey) with an Nvidia RTX 3050 Ti graphics chip; and a new Galaxy Book (a base-model clamshell laptop sharing its name with the earlier 2017 tablet but now in a traditional laptop form factor), the Galaxy Book Pro, and the Galaxy Book Pro 360 (a convertible, succeeding the Flex). The Galaxy Book Go, featuring a Snapdragon 7c Gen2 processor, was also announced. Throughout 2020 and 2021, these new models cemented Samsung Galaxy Book as a full replacement for the Samsung Notebook line.

In 2021, a foldable Galaxy Book Fold 17 was rumored, although it has not been made official.

=== Annual refresh series (2022–present) ===
Beginning in 2022, Samsung adopted an annual numbered series for the Galaxy Book line. The Galaxy Book2 series was announced in February 2022, with models including the Book2 Pro 360, Book2 Pro, Book2 360, and Book2 (not to be confused with the similarly named 2018 Galaxy Book 2 tablet).

The Galaxy Book3 Ultra, Book3 Pro, Book3 Pro 360, and Book3 360 were unveiled on February 1, 2023. The Book3 Ultra was the first in the line to feature high-end Nvidia GeForce RTX 40 series mobile graphics.

The Galaxy Book4 series (Ultra, Pro, Pro 360, and 360) were unveiled on February 26, 2024, featuring Intel's new Core Ultra processors. A base model Book4 followed later. The Book4 Edge, unveiled on May 20, marked a return to ARM-based processors for the line, using the Snapdragon X Elite.

The Galaxy Book5 series (Book5, Book5 Pro, Book5 Pro 360, and Book5 360) were unveiled in September 2024.

The Galaxy Book6 series (Book6, Book6 Pro, and Book6 Ultra) were announced at CES 2026 on January 6, 2026 and released on March 11, 2026.

Release history of Galaxy Book notebooks 2020—present
| Display size | Type | 2020 | 2021 | 2022 | 2023 | 2024 |
|---|---|---|---|---|---|---|
| 16.0" | Clamshell | | | | Book3 Ultra | Book4 Ultra |
| 16.0" | Clamshell | | | | Book3 Pro | Book4 Pro |
| 16.0" | Clamshell | | | | | Book4 Edge |
| 16.0" | 2-in-1 | | | | Book3 Pro 360 | Book4 Pro 360 |
| 15.6" | Clamshell | Ion | Ion2 | Book2 | | Book4 |
| 15.6" | Clamshell | | Pro | Book2 Pro | Replaced by 16" | |
| 15.6" | Clamshell | | Book | Replaced by Book2 | | |
| 15.6" | Clamshell | | Odyssey | | | |
| 15.6" | 2-in-1 | Flex | Flex2 | Book2 Pro 360 | Book3 360 | Book4 360 |
| 15.6" | 2-in-1 | | Pro 360 | | | |
| 14" | Clamshell | | Go | Book2 Business | Book3 Pro | Book4 Pro |
| 14" | Clamshell | | | | | Book4 Edge |
| 13.3" | Clamshell | Book S (Qualcomm) | Ion2 | Book2 | | |
| 13.3" | Clamshell | Book S (Intel) | Pro | Book2 Pro | | |
| 13.3" | Clamshell | Ion | | | | |
| 13.3" | 2-in-1 | Flex | Flex2 | Book2 Pro 360 | Book3 360 | |
| 13.3" | 2-in-1 | Flex α | Flex2 α | Book2 360 | | |
| 13.3" | 2-in-1 | | Pro 360 | | | |

== Model specifications comparison ==
Convertible tablets
| Model | Announced | Dimensions and weight | CPU | GPU | Display | Memory | Storage | Audio | Operating system | Pen |
|---|---|---|---|---|---|---|---|---|---|---|
| Galaxy TabPro S | 1/2016 | 290.3 × 198.8 × 6.3 mm, 693 g | Intel Core m3-6Y30 | Intel HD Graphics 515 | 12" sAMOLED 2160x1440 | | | Built-in stereo speakers | | TabPro Pen |
| Galaxy Book | 2/2017 | 261.20 mm × 179.10 mm × 8.90 mm, 640 g (10.6"); 291.3 mm × 199.8 mm × 7.4 mm, 1.12 kg (12.0") | Intel Core i5 Kaby Lake, Intel Core m3 | | 10.6" 1920×1280 TFT FHD, 12" 2160x1440 AMOLED | | 64/128/256 GB | | | S Pen |
| Galaxy Book 2 | 10/2018 | 287.5 mm × 200.4 mm × 7.6 mm, 1.75 lb | Snapdragon 850 | | 12" sAMOLED 1440x2160 | 4 GB | 128 GB | AKG speakers with Dolby Atmos | Windows 10 Home (S Mode) | S Pen |

Clamshell laptops
| Model | Announced | Dimensions and weight | CPU | GPU | Display | RAM | Storage | Networking | Audio | Operating system |
|---|---|---|---|---|---|---|---|---|---|---|
| Galaxy Book S (Qualcomm) | 8/2019 | 305.2 × 203.2 × 11.8 mm, 0.96 kg | Snapdragon 8cx Octa-Core | Qualcomm Adreno 680 | 13.3" FHD (1920x1080) TFT LCD with Touch Screen Panel | 8 GB | 256 GB | | Quad Stereo Speakers: Sound by AKG; Immersive sound with Dolby Atmos technology | Windows 10 Home/Pro |
| Galaxy Book Ion | 10/2019 | 305.7 × 199.8 × 12.9 mm, 0.97 kg (Ion 13); 356.1 × 228 × 14.9 mm, 1.26 kg (Ion 15) | 10th Intel Core | Intel UHD Graphics 630, Nvidia GeForce MX250 | 13.3"/15.6" QLED FHD (1920×1080) | 16 GB | 1 TB SSD | | AKG Stereo Speakers with Smart Amp | Windows 10 Home/Pro |
| Galaxy Book S (Intel) | 05/2020 | 305.2 mm × 203.2 mm × 11.8 mm, 0.95 kg | Intel Core Lakefield with Intel Hybrid Technology | Intel UHD Graphics | 13.3" FHD (1920x1080) TFT LCD with Touch Screen Panel | 8 GB | 256 GB | | Quad Stereo Speakers: Sound by AKG; Immersive sound with Dolby Atmos technology | |
| Galaxy Book Ion2 | 12/2020 | 305.7 mm × 199.8 mm × 12.9 mm, 1.16 kg (13"); 356.1 mm × 228.0 mm × 14.9 mm, 1.57 kg (15") | 11th Intel Core i5, i7 | Intel Iris Xe, Nvidia GeForce MX450 (external) | 13.3"/15.6" QLED FHD (1920×1080) | up to 32 GB | up to 1 TB/2 TB SSD | | | Windows 10 Home/Pro; Linux |
| Galaxy Book Pro | 04/2021 | 304.4 × 199.8 × 11.2 mm, 870 g (13"); 355.4 × 225.8 × 13.3 mm, 1.15 kg (15") | 11th Intel Core i3, i5, i7 | Intel UHD Graphics, Intel Iris Xe, Nvidia GeForce MX450 | 15.6"/13.3" sAMOLED 1920×1080 | 8 GB, 16 GB, 32 GB (LPDDR4x) | Up to 1 TB (NVMe SSD) | | | Windows 10 Home/Pro |
| Galaxy Book | 04/2021 | 356.6 mm × 229.2 mm × 15.4 mm, 1.61 kg | 11th Intel Core i3 | Nvidia GeForce MX450 | 15.6" PLS 1920×1080 | 8 GB | 256 GB/512 GB | | | |
| Galaxy Book Odyssey | 04/2021 | 356.6 mm × 229.1 mm × 17.7 mm, 1.85 kg | 11th Intel Core i5, i7 | Nvidia GeForce RTX 30 series | 15.6" TFT LCD, FHD (1920×1080) | up to 32 GB (DDR4) | up to 2 TB | | Dolby Atmos | |
| Galaxy Book Go | 6/2021 | 323.9 mm × 224.8 mm × 14.9 mm, 1.38 kg | Snapdragon 7c Gen2, Snapdragon 8cx Gen 2 (5G version) | Qualcomm Adreno | 14" TFT 1920 x 1080 | 4 GB/8 GB | 64 GB/128 GB | | Dolby Atmos | |
| Galaxy Book2 Go 5G | 7/2023 (UK) | 323.9 mm x 224.8 mm x 15.5 mm, 1.44 kg | Snapdragon 7c+ Gen3 | Qualcomm Adreno | 14" TFT 1920 x 1080 | 4GB / 8GB | 128 GB / 256 GB eUFS | | | |
| Galaxy Book2 Pro | 2/2022 | 304.4 mm × 199.8 mm × 11.2 mm, 870 g (13"); 355.4 mm × 225.8 mm × 11.7 mm, 1.17 kg (15") | 12th Intel Core i5, i7 | Intel Iris Xe, Intel Arc | 15.6"/13.3" | 16 GB | 1 TB | | Sound by AKG with Dolby Atmos | Windows 11 |
| Galaxy Book2 | 2/2022 | 358.2 mm × 236.9 mm × 18.5 mm, 1.86 kg | 12th Intel Core i5, Intel Pentium 8505, Intel Celeron 7305 | Intel Iris Xe, Intel UHD Graphics | 15.6" | 8 GB | 256/512 GB, 1 TB (SSD); 500 GB, 1 TB (Optional HDD) | | Dolby Atmos | |
| Galaxy Book3 Ultra | 2/2023 | 355.4 × 250.4 × 16.5 mm, 1.79 kg (16") | 13th Gen Intel Core i7, i9 | Intel Iris Xe, Nvidia GeForce RTX 4050/4070 Mobile | 16" WQXGA (2880x1800) Dynamic AMOLED 2X | up to 32 GB | up to 2 TB | | | |
| Galaxy Book3 Pro | 2/2023 | 312.3 × 223.8 × 11.3 mm, 1.17 kg (14"); 355.4 × 250.4 × 12.5 mm, 1.56 kg (16") | 13th Gen Intel Core i5, i7 | Intel Iris Xe | 14"/16" 2880 x 1800 Dynamic OLED 2X | 8 GB/16 GB | 256 GB/512 GB | | | |
| Galaxy Book4 Ultra | 12/2023 | 355.4 mm × 250.4 mm × 16.5 mm, 1.86 kg | Intel Core Ultra 9 / Ultra 7 | NVIDIA GeForce RTX 4070/4050 | 16" 2880x1800 Touch AMOLED | 16/32/64 GB | 512 GB/1 TB/2 TB | | | |
| Galaxy Book4 Pro | 12/2023 | 312.3 mm × 223.8 mm × 11.6 mm, 1.23 kg (14"); 355.4 mm × 250.4 mm × 12.5 mm, 1.56 kg (16") | Intel Core Ultra 7 / Ultra 5 | Intel Arc | 14"/16" 2880x1800 WQXGA+ (2880x1800) | 16 GB/32 GB | 512 GB/1 TB/2 TB | | | |
| Galaxy Book4 | 02/2024 | | Intel Core 7 | Intel Graphics | 15.6" | 16 GB | 512 GB | | | |
| Galaxy Book4 Edge | 05/2024 | 312.3 × 223.8 × 10.9 mm, 1.16 kg (14"); 355.4 × 250.4 × 12.3 mm (16") | Snapdragon X Elite X1E-80-100 / X1E-84-00 | Qualcomm Adreno | 14"/16" 2880×1800 AMOLED 3K | 16 GB | 512 GB/1 TB | | Dual Microphones / Quad Speaker with Dolby Atmos | |
| Galaxy Book5 Pro | 01/2025 | 312.3 mm × 223.8 mm × 11.6 mm, 1.23 kg (14"); 355.4 mm × 250.4 mm × 12.5 mm, 1.56 kg (16") | Intel Core Ultra 7 / Ultra 5 (Intel EVO) | Intel Arc | 14"/16" 2880×1800 AMOLED 3K, WQXGA+, 500nits, 48–120 Hz | 16 GB/32 GB | 256 GB/512 GB/1 TB | | | |

2-in-1 laptops (all feature Wacom digitizers and support S Pen)
| Model | Announced | Dimensions and weight | CPU | GPU | Display | RAM | Storage | Networking | Audio | Operating system |
|---|---|---|---|---|---|---|---|---|---|---|
| Galaxy Book Flex | 10/2019 | 302.6 mm × 202.9 mm × 12.9 mm, 1.15 kg (Flex 13); 355 mm × 227.2 mm × 14.9 mm, 1.57 kg (Flex 15) | 10th Gen Intel Core (Ice Lake) | Nvidia GeForce MX250 | 15.6"/13.3" QLED 1920×1080 | 16 GB | 1 TB | | AKG Stereo Speakers with Smart Amp | Windows 10 |
| Galaxy Book Flex α (Alpha) | 01/2020 | 304.9 × 202 × 13.9 mm, 1.19 kg | 10th Gen Intel Core (Ice Lake) | Intel UHD Graphics | 13.3" QLED FHD (1920×1080) | 8 GB/12 GB DDR4 | 256 GB/512 GB/1 TB SSD | | Stereo Speakers | |
| Galaxy Book Flex2 | 12/2020 | 302.6 mm × 202.9 mm × 12.9 mm, 1.16 kg (13"); 355.0 mm × 227.2 mm × 14.9 mm, 1.57 kg (15") | 11th Gen Intel Core i5, i7 | Intel Iris Xe, Nvidia GeForce MX450 (GDDR5 2 GB) | 15.6"/13.3" QLED 1920×1080 | up to 16 GB | up to 1 TB | | Sound by AKG with Smart Amp | |
| Galaxy Book Flex2 α (Alpha) | 04/2021 | 304.8 mm × 201.93 mm × 13.97 mm, 1.19 kg (13.3") | 11th Gen Intel Core i5, i7 | Intel Iris Xe | 15.6"/13.3" QLED | 8 GB/16 GB | 256 GB/512 GB | | | |
| Galaxy Book Pro 360 | 04/2021 | 302.5 × 202.0 × 11.5 mm, 1.04-1.1 kg (13"); 354.85 × 227.97 × 11.9 mm, 1.39 kg (15") | 11th Gen Intel Core i3, i5, i7 | Intel Iris Xe, Intel UHD Graphics | 15.6"/13.3" Super AMOLED, FHD (1920×1080) | 8 GB/16 GB | 256 GB/512 GB/1 TB | | Sound by AKG with Dolby Atmos | |
| Galaxy Book2 Pro 360 | 02/2022 | 302.5 mm × 202 mm × 11.5 mm, 1.05 kg (13"); 354.85 mm × 227.97 mm × 11.9 mm, 1.41 kg (15") | 12th Gen Intel Core i5, i7 | Intel Iris Xe | 15.6"/13.3" sAMOLED 1920×1080 | 8 GB/16 GB/32 GB | 256 GB/512 GB/1 TB | | | |
| Galaxy Book2 360 | 02/2022 | 304.4 mm × 199.8 mm × 11.2 mm (13"); 355.4 mm × 225.8 mm × 11.7 mm (15") | 12th Gen Intel Core i5, i7 | Intel Iris Xe | 15.6"/13.3" | 16 GB | up to 1 TB | | | |
| Galaxy Book3 Pro 360 | 02/2023 | 355.4 mm × 252.2 mm × 12.8 mm, 1.66 kg | 13th Gen Intel Core | Intel Iris Xe | 16" WQXGA (2880x1800) Dynamic AMOLED 2X with touch screen | 8 GB/16 GB/32 GB | 256 GB/512 GB/1 TB | | | |
| Galaxy Book3 360 | 02/2023 | 304.2 × 201.9 × 12.9 mm, 1.16 kg | 13th Gen Intel Core | Intel Iris Xe | 13.3"/15.6" sAMOLED | 8 GB/16 GB | 256 GB/512 GB/1 TB | | | |
| Galaxy Book4 Pro 360 | 12/2023 | 355.4 × 252.2 × 12.8 mm, 1.66 kg | Intel Core Ultra 7 / Core Ultra 5 (Intel EVO Edition) | Intel Arc | 16" WQXGA+ (2880×1800) Touch AMOLED, 400 nits | 16 GB/32 GB | 512 GB/1 TB | Wi-Fi 6E, 802.11 ax 2x2, Bluetooth v5.3 | Studio-quality Dual Microphones and AKG Quad speakers with Dolby Atmos | |
| Galaxy Book4 360 | 02/2024 | | Intel Core 7 / Core 5 | Intel | 15.6" AMOLED | 16 GB | 512 GB/1 TB | | | |
| Galaxy Book5 360 | 05/2024 | 355.4 mm × 228.0 mm × 13.7 mm, 1.46 kg (15") | Intel Core Ultra 7 / Ultra 5 (Intel EVO) | Intel Arc | 15" AMOLED, FHD (1920x1080), 500nits, 60 Hz | 16 GB/32 GB | 256 GB/512 GB/1 TB | | | |
| Galaxy Book5 Pro 360 | 09/2024 | 355.4 mm × 252.2 mm × 12.8 mm, 1.69 kg (16") | Intel Core Ultra 7 / Ultra 5 (Intel EVO) | Intel Arc | 16" AMOLED, WQXGA+ (2880x1800), 500nits | 16 GB/32 GB | 512 GB/1 TB | | | |

== See also ==
- Samsung Galaxy
- Samsung Notebook
- Samsung Ativ
