= Samsung Ativ =

Windows-based personal computers

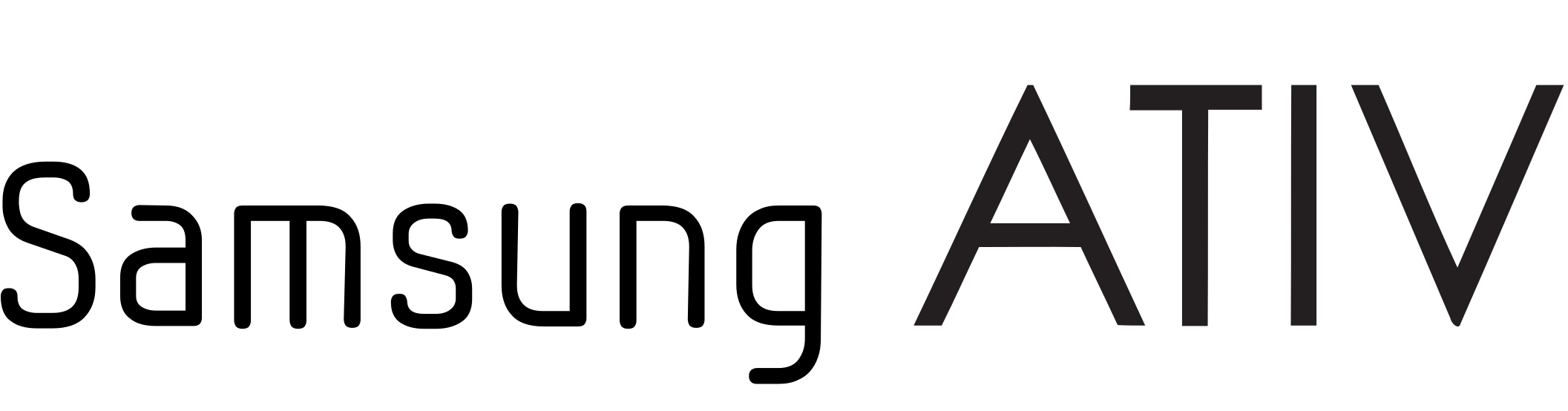

Samsung Ativ (stylized as ATIV) is a discontinued series of Microsoft Windows-based personal computers and mobile computing devices produced by Samsung Electronics, marketed from 2012 to 2016. The word Ativ is the word vita, meaning "life", written backwards.

The brand was originally used for Samsung's Windows 8 and Windows Phone 8-based tablets and smartphones, including one device running Windows RT. In April 2013, Samsung announced that it would extend the brand to all of its future PC products (including conventional laptops and desktop computers, such as its newly introduced Ativ Book 5 and Ativ Book 6), and re-branded some of its existing product lines and models under the Ativ name, including "Ativ Book" (for laptops), and "Ativ One" (for all-in-one computers).

Ativ was the result of the unification of its Windows-based Samsung Series computers and Samsung Omnia mobiles. However after lackluster performance, the Ativ brand was scrapped in South Korea in 2014 with new computers branded Samsung Notebook. In overseas markets, Ativ continued until January 2016 when Samsung released the Galaxy TabPro S, its first Windows 10 device under the Galaxy brand, which had traditionally been reserved only for Samsung devices running the rival Android operating system. Afterwards, the Galaxy Book line was formed.

== Smartphones ==
- Samsung Ativ S
- Samsung Ativ Odyssey
- Samsung Ativ SE
- Samsung ATIV S Neo

== Tablets and convertibles ==
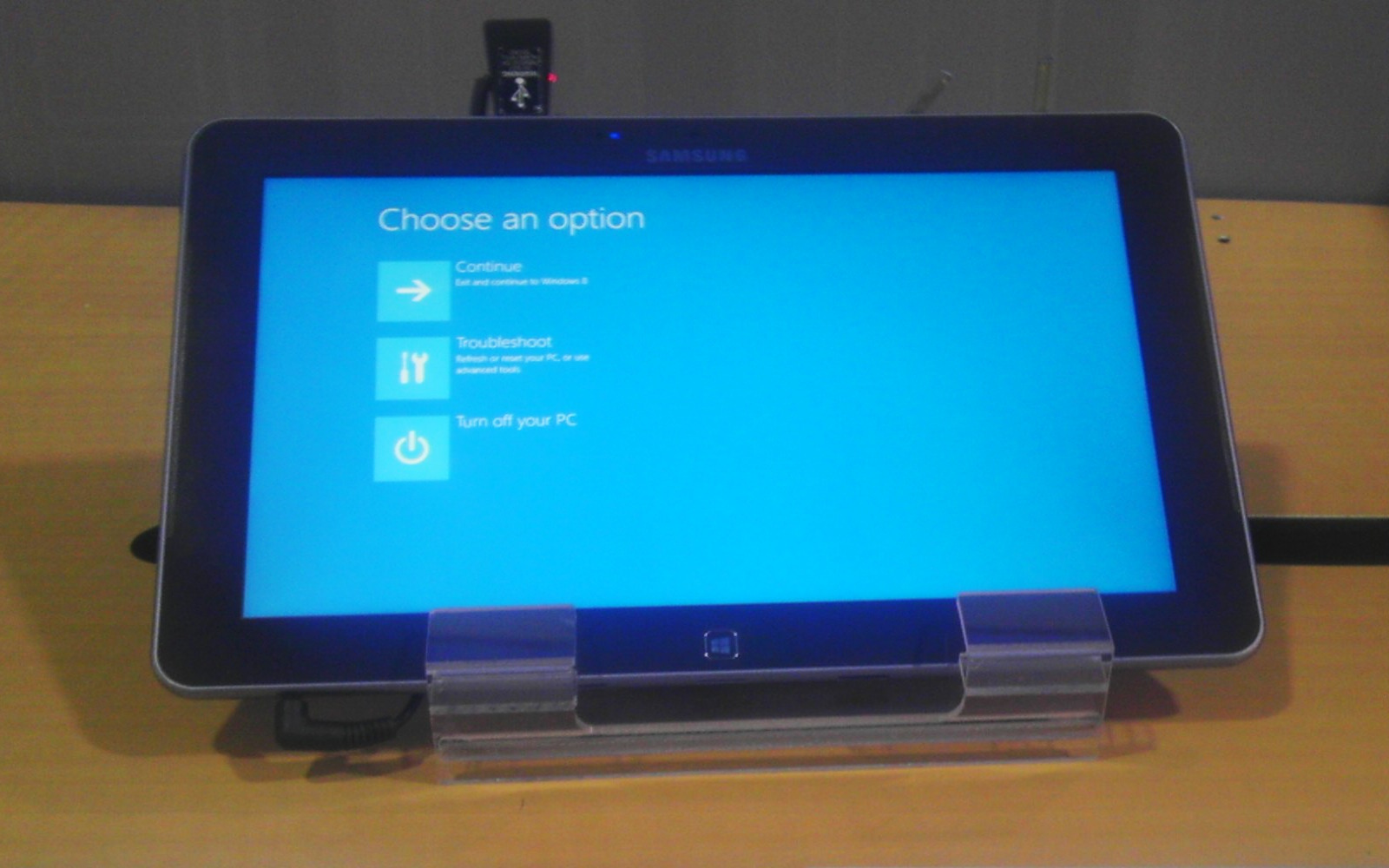
11.6 inch Ativ Tab 5/7 tablet

- Samsung Ativ Tab (Windows RT)
- Samsung Ativ Tab 5 (Smart PC) (Windows 8)
- Samsung Ativ Tab 7 (Smart PC Pro) (Windows 8)
- Samsung Ativ Tab 3 (Windows 8)
- Samsung Ativ Q (Windows 8 and Android 4.2.2 Jellybean)

== Personal computers ==
=== Laptops ===
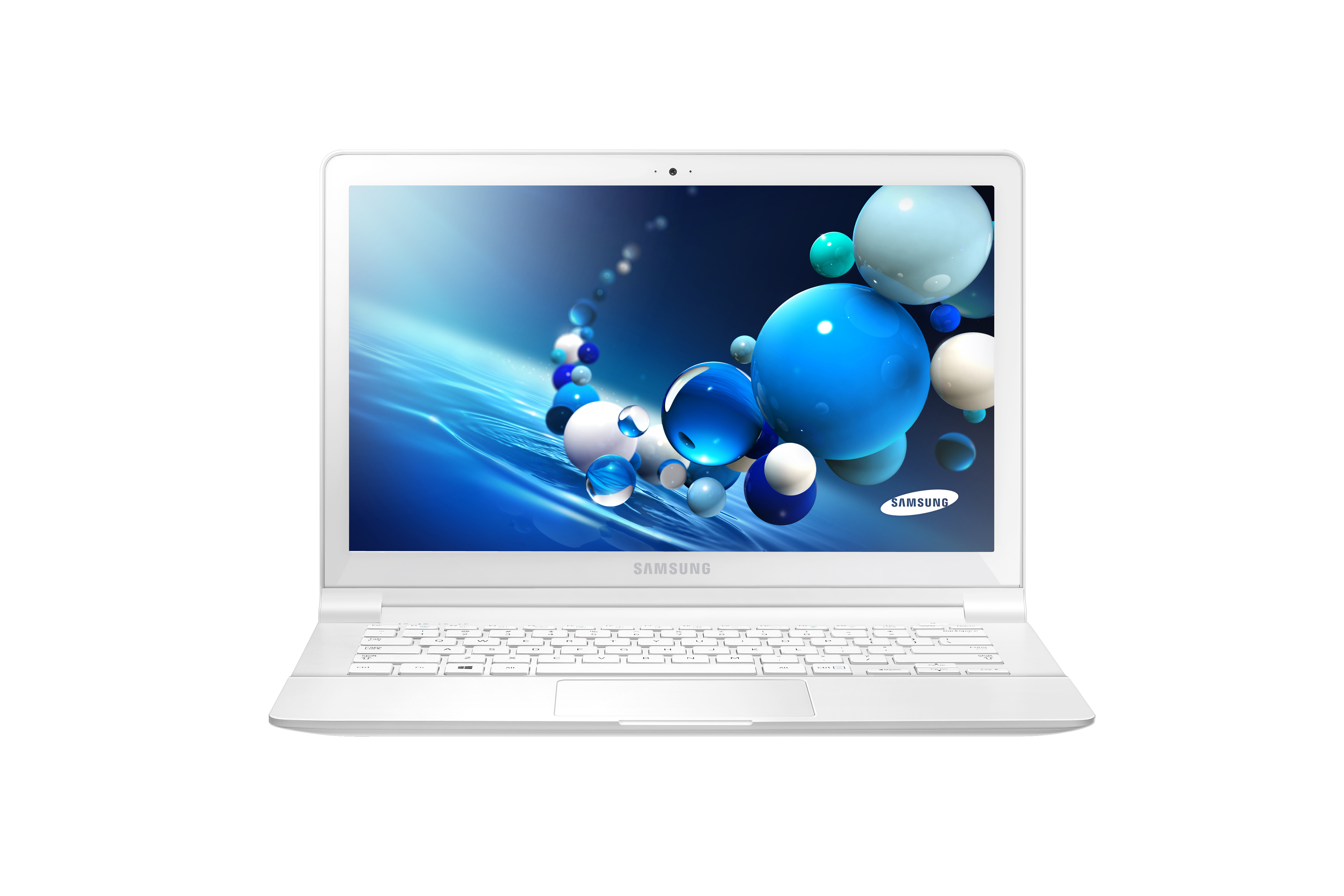
Samsung ATIV Book 9 Lite

- Samsung Ativ Book 2
- Samsung Ativ Book 4 370
- Samsung Ativ Book 4 510
- Samsung Ativ Book 5
- Samsung Ativ Book 6
- Samsung Ativ Book 7
- Samsung Ativ Book 8
- Samsung Ativ Book 9 Plus (Black) (Windows 8)
- Samsung Ativ Book 9 Lite (White) (Windows 8/ Pro)

=== Desktops ===
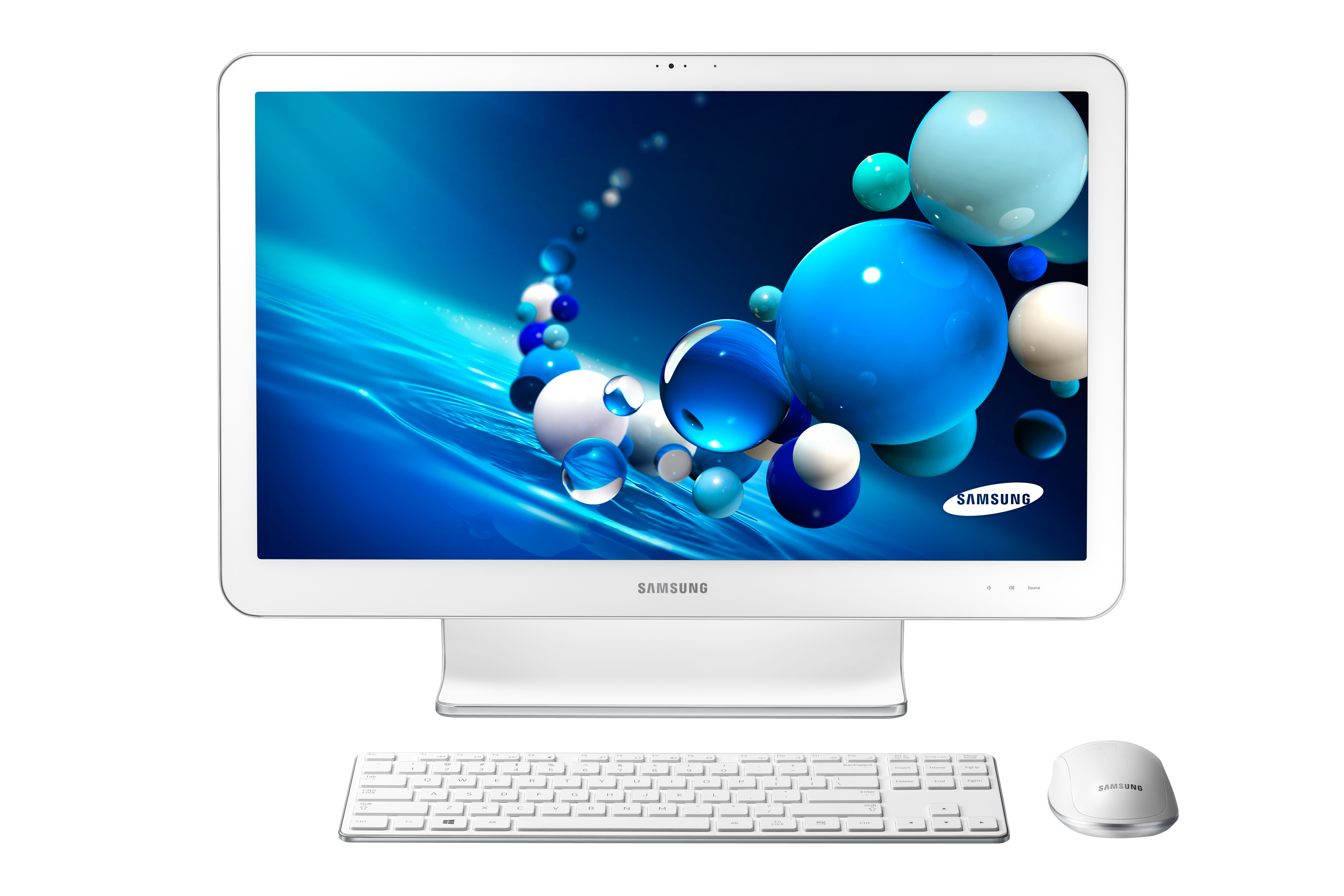
Samsung ATIV One 5

- Samsung Ativ One 3
- Samsung Ativ One 5
- Samsung Ativ One 7
- Samsung Ativ One 7 Curved

== See also ==
- Omnia, brand used for a family of Windows Mobile and Windows Phone 7 devices.
- Galaxy, brand used for Samsung's family of Android-based products.
- Lumia, smartphone and tablet series by Microsoft with powered by Windows Phone and Windows RT.
