= Samsung Notebook =

Computer series by Samsung Electronics

Samsung Notebook / Samsung Sens
- Developer: Samsung Electronics
- Manufacturer: Samsung Electronics
- Type: Laptop
- Released: 1995; 31 years ago 2014; 12 years ago
- Discontinued: 2022; 4 years ago
- Operating system: Windows, Linux
- CPU: AMD, Intel
- Graphics: AMD, Nvidia, Intel
- Marketing target: Consumer
- Successor: Galaxy Book
- Website: www.samsung.com/ca/pc/all-pc/

Samsung Notebook (stylized as SΛMSUNG Notebook), formerly known as Samsung Sens (삼성 센스) and also marketed as Samsung Notebook Series (2011–2013), is a discontinued line of consumer-oriented portable computers produced by Samsung Electronics. The Sens line was first launched in 1995 and lasted until 2013, exported overseas without the Sens branding, and replaced by Samsung Ativ. Ativ itself was also dropped in favor of Samsung Notebook. As of 2020, Samsung Notebook co-exists with the company's Galaxy Book line of laptops but is facing transition.

== History ==
Samsung SENS logo as of 2010

The SENS brand (Samsung Electronics Notebook System) started in 1995, a year after Samsung laptop business started with the SPC5800/5900 series in 1994 which initially had a 486 processor and later Pentium 75 MHz. In 1996 Samsung introduced the Sens 810, which was the first notebook with an ergonomic keyboard. In 2001 the three-digit model name was replaced by a new lettered series: A, T, P, Q, V. The A series was equipped with a low-cost AMD Athlon processor. The M30 and M35 came with equipped JBL speakers. The first Intel Centrino platform computer was the X10. A large 17-inch screen model called M40 was released. The X20, X25 and X50 series were released with Intel Sonoma.

Another 17 inch laptop, M70, was launched in 2005 featuring a high end graphics chip from Nvidia and a resolution of 1680 x 1050. Its screen could also be used separately. It weighed 5 kg. In 2006, the Sens Q35 was the first notebook PC with WiMAX. It was sold in South Korea and Russia.

According to Gartner research, Samsung laptop sales amounted to 1.5 million units in 2007. Sales grew 77% in 2008, 116% in 2009 and 78% in 2010.

In 2007 Samsung launched the first ultra mobile PC, the Samsung Q1. It had a 7 inch touchscreen and equipped with features such as WLAN, DMB and navigation. Its second generation was then launched based on Intel Ultra Mobile Platform.

In 2007, Samsung created a 19 inch desktop-sized laptop, the Sens G25.

For the export market, Samsung Electronics only sold laptops to a number of Western European countries as well as Russia and Ukraine, before expanding.

In July 2008 Samsung introduced laptops with Intel Centrino 2 with a crystal black design. Models include Q210 (12.1"), Q310 (13.3"), R560 (15.4") and R710 (17"). In October 2008, Samsung announced its return to the United States and Canada laptop market, with the models being X360, X460, Q310, R610, and P460, and netbook NC1.

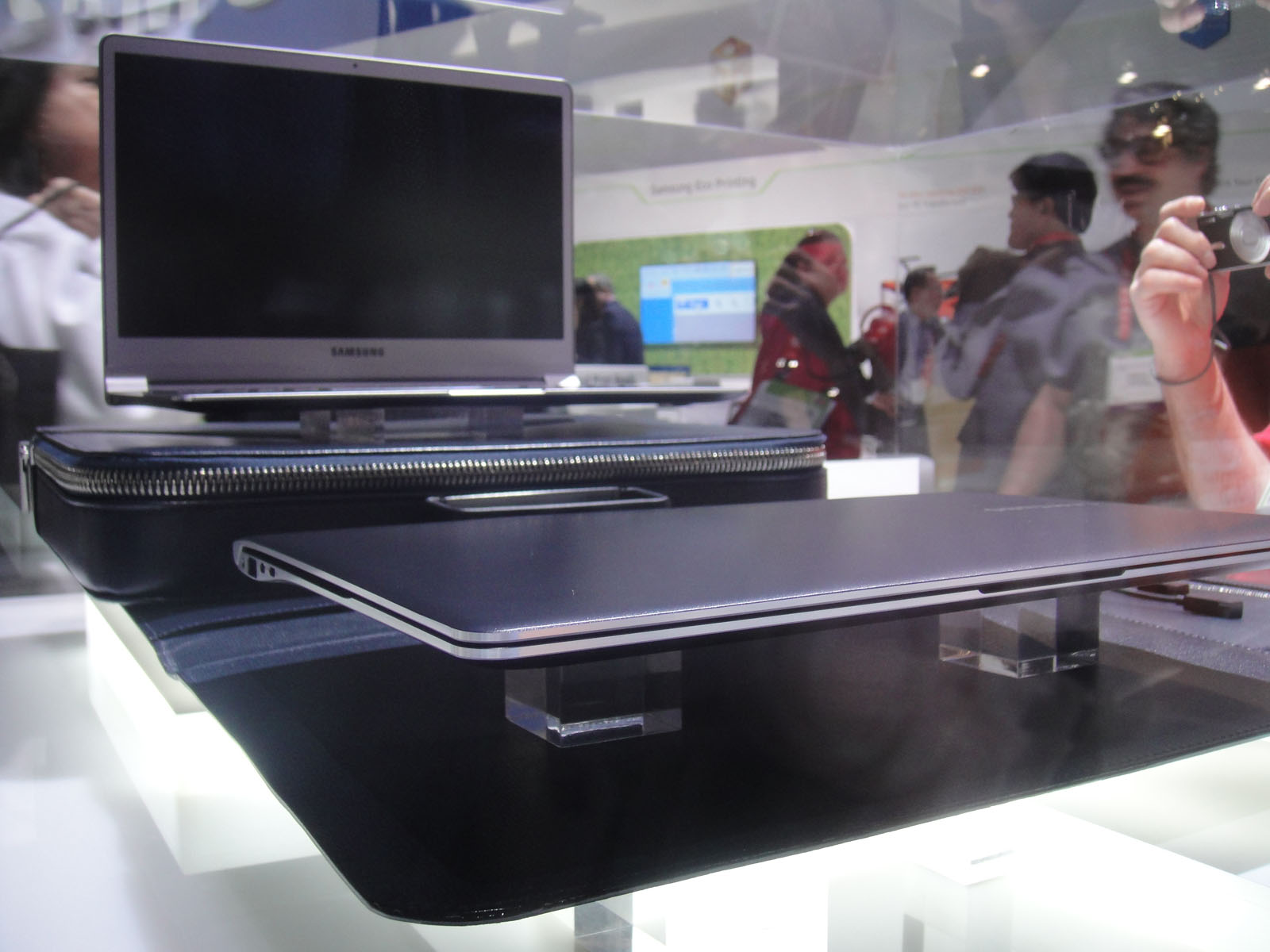
Samsung Series 9 second generation at CES 2012

In January 2011, the premium Samsung Sens 9 (known as Samsung Series 9 internationally) was introduced. It was remarkably sleek and thin, marking a departure from Samsung's previous laptops. It gained attention and was very well received as a result. Samsung Series 5, a mid-ranger, was later introduced and an entry-level Series 3 too. Chromebook variants of the 3 and 5 were also made.

In 2012 the second generation Samsung Notebook Series 9 was released. Samsung Series 9, Series 7 Chronos, Series 7 Ultra, and Series 5 Chronos were changed to Ativ Book 9, Ativ Book 8, Ativ Book 7, and Ativ Book 6 with the change to ATIV branding. The Ativ name was abandoned in the domestic market in 2014 and overseas in 2016, with rebranding to Samsung Notebook. Samsung Notebook 9 was introduced in 2016. There were further new Notebook 9 updates released in the following years.

In June 2016, the Samsung Notebook 7 Spin was announced. In 2018 there were new Notebook 5 and Notebook 3 models. 2019 saw the introduction of Samsung Notebook Flash.

== Series ==
=== E Series ===
==== E3520 ====
The Sens E3520 features a 15 inch screen, 4GB memory, 500GB storage, and shipped with Windows 7.

=== G Series ===
Samsung/Sens also had G models, which were laptops without batteries, or to be exact, mobile desktops. It was a budget PC series being very heavy in weight and low processing power. It had two recent models, G10 (from 2006) and G15.

=== M Series ===
This series includes laptop computers with large screens (17"~19") and faster processors (Core 2 Duo), graphic cards, etc. For example: M50 (Intel Pentium M and Windows XP), M55, M70.

=== N Series ===
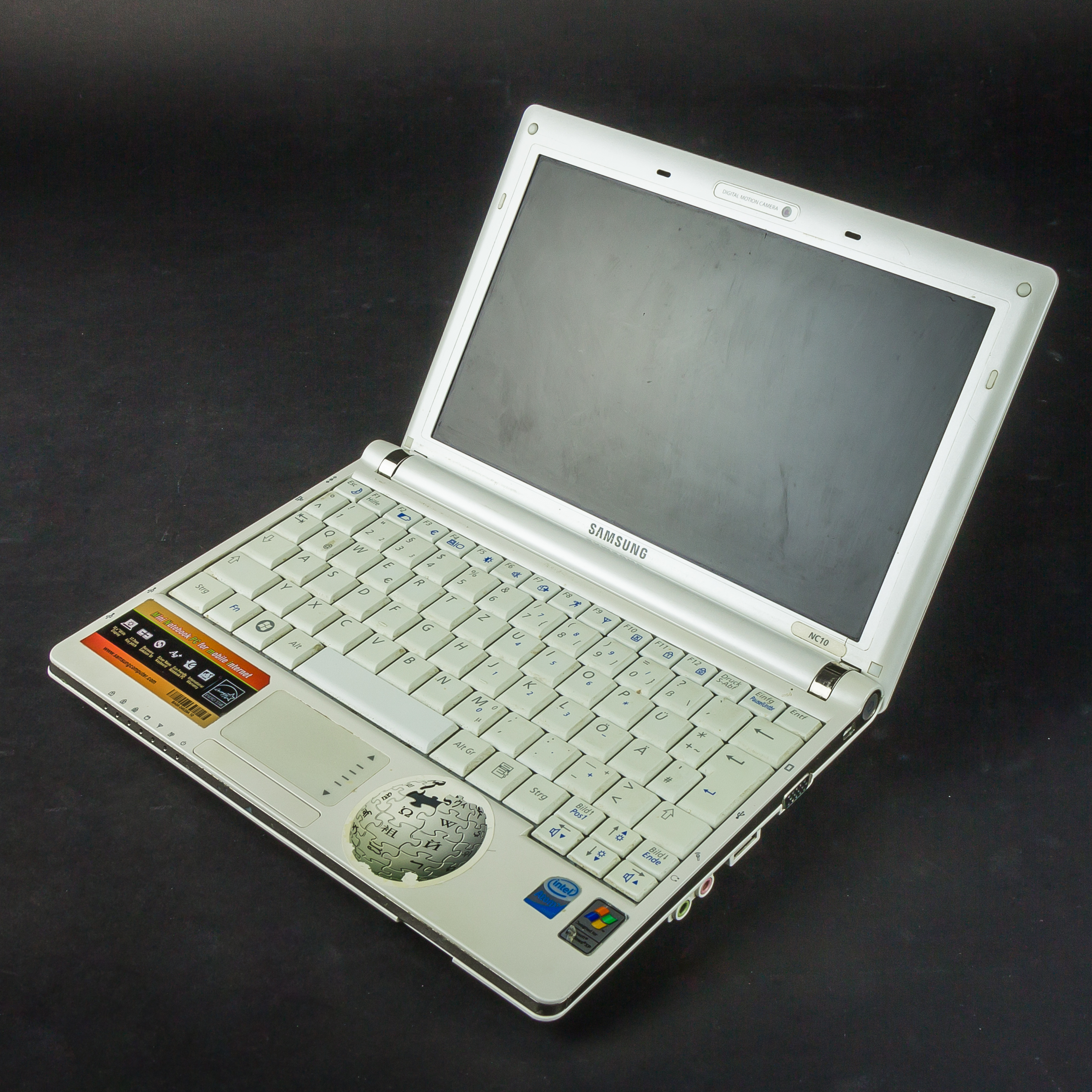
Samsung NC10 netbook (2008)

This is Samsung's netbook line-up, with the emphasis on keeping size, weight and cost to a minimum. The first N-series Sens model worldwide was the Sens NC10, released in 2008 with Windows XP. There were also netbooks under the NF line.

=== Notebook 3/Series ===
The first generation Samsung Series 3 (model no. NP300E5A) was released in 2011. Its central processing unit is an Intel Core i3-2330M Processor with a processing speed of 2.20 gigahertz. It comes with 4 gigabytes of DDR3 SDRAM, expandable up to 8. It has a display size of 15.6 inches with a 1366 x 768 resolution. The graphics chipset is an Intel HD Graphics 3000, has a built-in 1.3MP HD webcam, a wireless LAN of 802.11 a/b/g/n, is Bluetooth 3.0 compatible, and has VGA, HDMI, and three USB ports. It has a built-in track point mouse.

The last Notebook 3 was released in 2018 in 14 and 15 inch variants and running on 8th generation Intel Core processors.

=== Notebook 4/Series ===
Series 4-

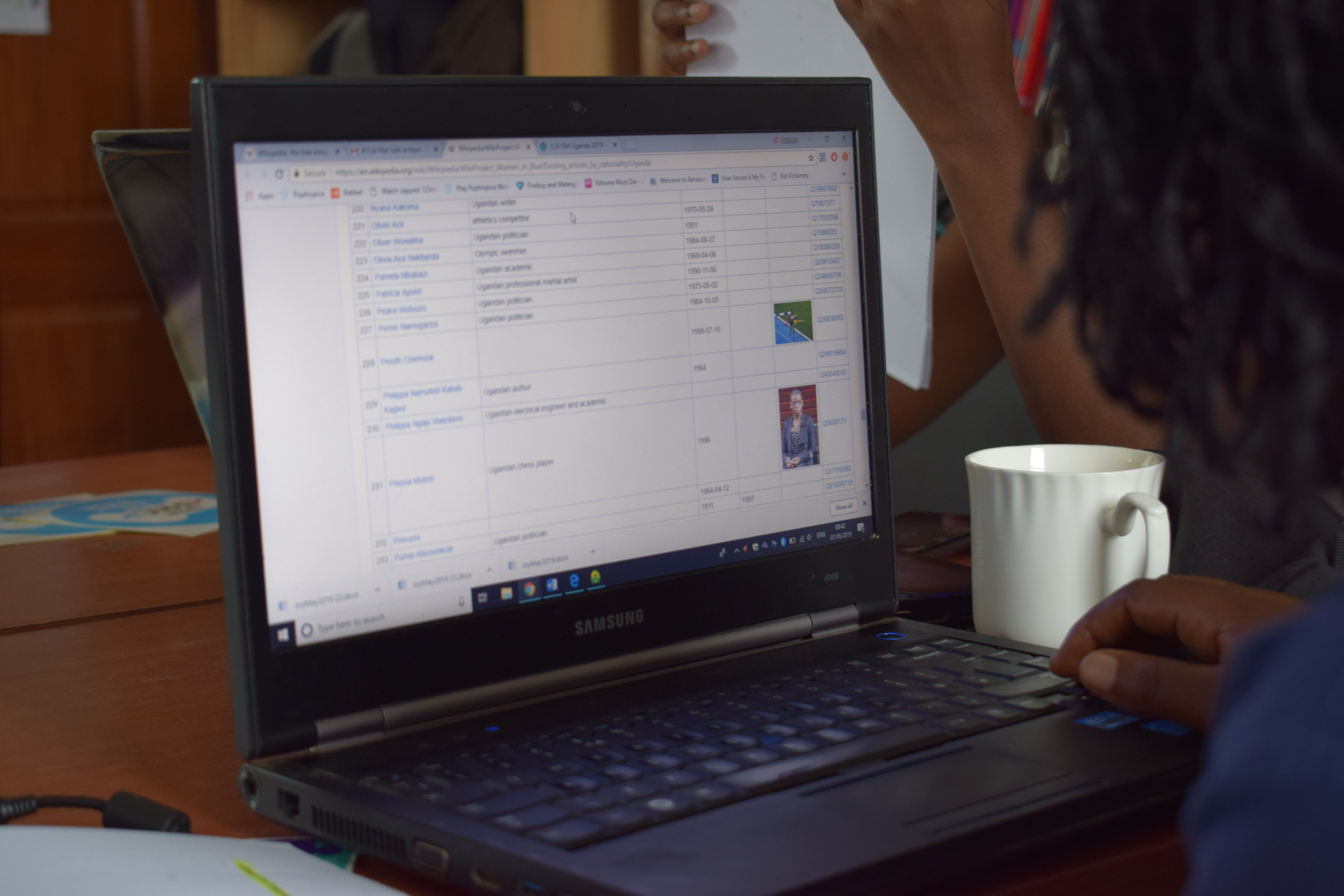
Samsung Series 4 (2011)

=== Notebook 5/Series ===
Samsung Notebook 5 (including Chronos and Ultra) were formerly also marketed as ATIV Book 6, ATIV Book 5 and ATIV Book 4. The last Notebook 5 model was released in 2018 with a 15 inch display, 8th generation Intel Core i7.

=== Notebook 7/Series ===
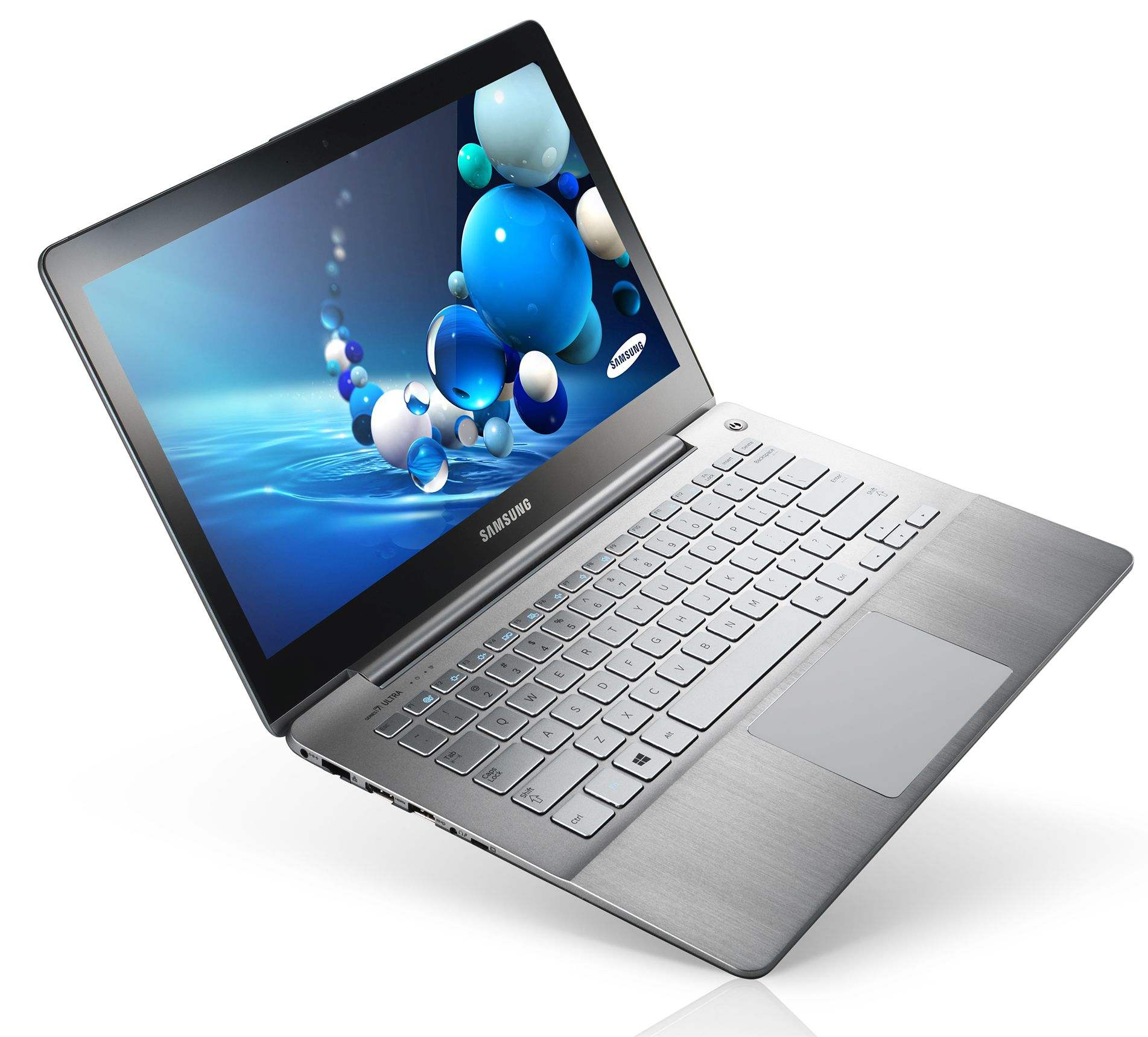
Series 7 Ultra (2012)

The Samsung Series 7 Chronos was introduced in late 2011. It was later changed into Samsung Ativ Book 8 and Book 7.
The Samsung Notebook 7 Spin is a 2-in-1 notebook with a 13-inch and 15-inch touchscreen and Intel Core i5 and i7 processors that were introduced in 2016. In 2019, a new Notebook 7 and Notebook 7 Force models were released.

=== Notebook 9/Series ===
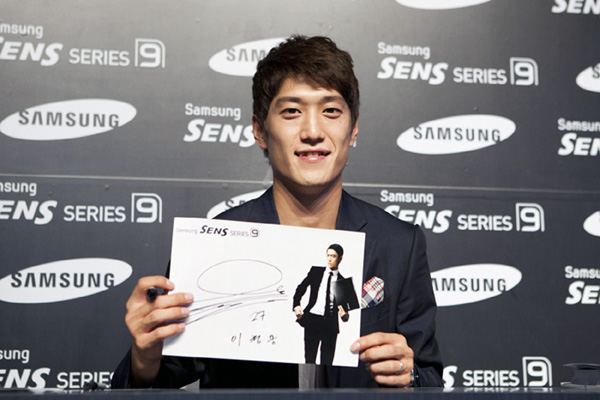
Lee Chung-yong advertising the Series 9

The Samsung Notebook 9 is the top of the line product in the range and was designed to be very thin. It was previously sold as Ativ Book 9 and Series 9. It includes various other variants such as Spin (convertible) and Pen (pen-enabled).

=== Notebook Flash ===
Introduced at CES 2019, Samsung Notebook Flash is a budget-oriented laptop with a 13.3" display.

=== Notebook M ===
Samsung Notebook M is a budget entry-level ultrabook. It runs Windows 10 S.

=== Notebook Odyssey ===
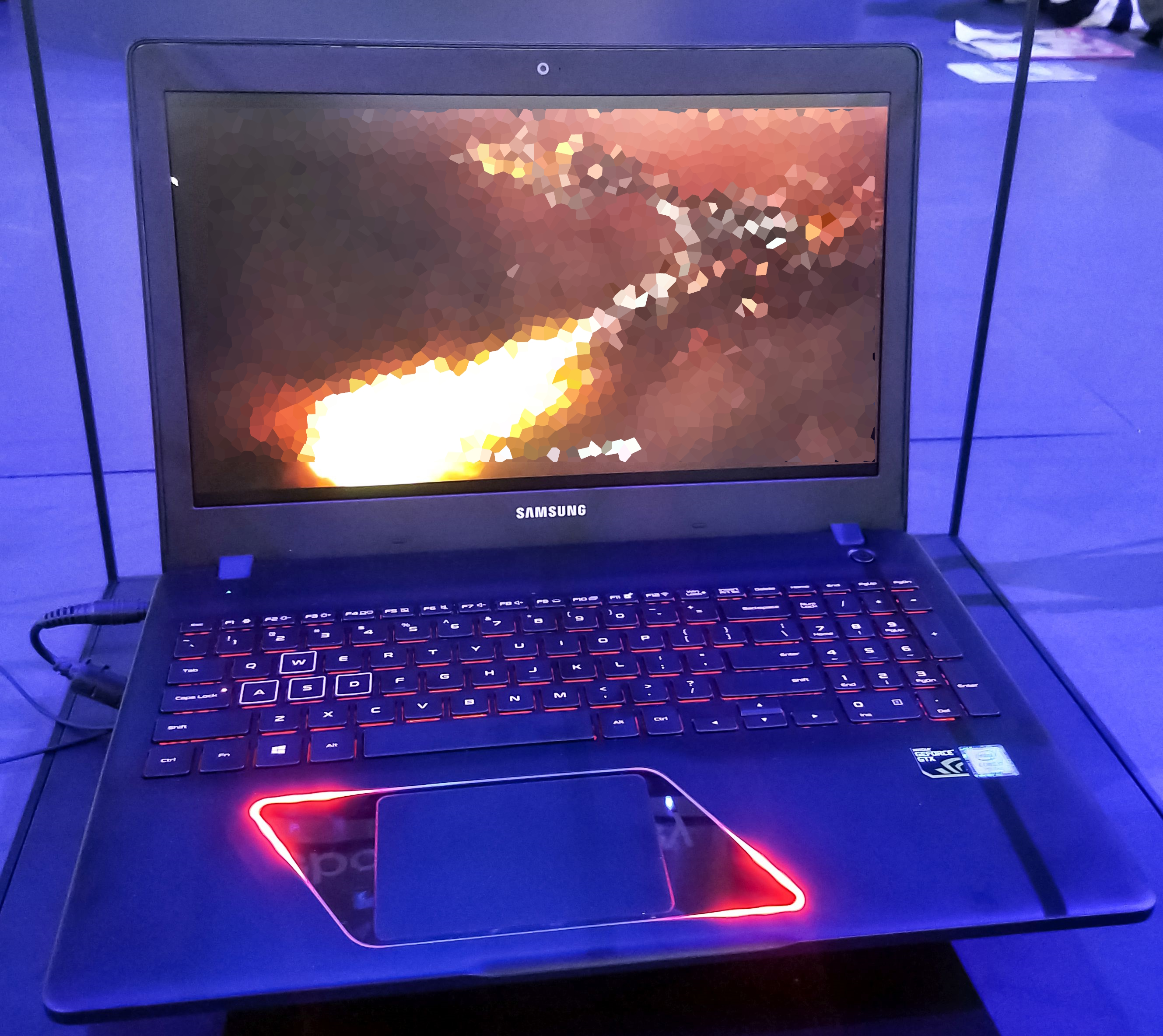
Notebook Odyssey (2017)

Samsung Notebook Odyssey is a 17.3-inch/15.6-inch gaming laptop introduced in 2017 featuring an Nvidia GeForce GTX 1050 graphics chip. A second generation was released in 2019 with a Nvidia GeForce RTX 20-series GPU.

=== Notebook Plus ===
Replacing Samsung Notebook 5, Samsung Notebook Plus was launched in 2020 as a basic 15" display laptop. A second generation Notebook Plus2 was announced in December 2020 and features a dot matrix keyboard, HDD expansion, and either Nvidia GeForce GTX 1650 Ti or MX450 graphics.

=== P Series ===
This Sens was a mainstream notebook - a kind that is noted with the characteristics of being fair in price, heavy, short in battery life, and thick. A Sens P10, released in 2002, was reported to have its battery melted in South Korea six years later.

=== Q Series ===
This series is an ultraportable, or at least they were quite light laptops. It has the characteristics of portable laptops: long battery life, small screen size, rather thin and light. Q series includes Q30 (Also Sold as Dell Latitude X1), Q40 (Core Solo), Q35 (Core 2 Duo or Celeron M), and UMPCs, Q1 and Q1 Ultra. Recently, the 13.3" screen Q70 was released bringing a new maximum screen size into the Q range. Both the Q70 and 12.1" Q45 introduce the Santa Rosa platform in Samsung notebooks. They continue their Q line with QX line.

	Q330	Q430	Q530
Announced	May 2010		
Operating system	Windows 7		
CPU	Intel Core i3		
Memory	4GB		
Storage	1TB		
Display	13.3"	14"	15.6"
Graphics	Intel GMA HD	Nvidia GeForce 310M (Optimus)	
Optical drive	Yes		
Camera	Yes		
Connectivity	VGA port, RJ-45 Ethernet, HDMI port, USB 3.0 port, 2x USB 2.0 ports, headphone/microphone jack, SD card slot		
Power	60 W		
Dimensions	12.7" x 9.5" x 1.12"-1.52"	13.5" x 1.0"-1.3" x 9.4"	15.0" x 1.06"-1.28" x 10.0"
Mass	4.4 lbs	4.7 lbs	5.2 lbs

=== QX Series ===
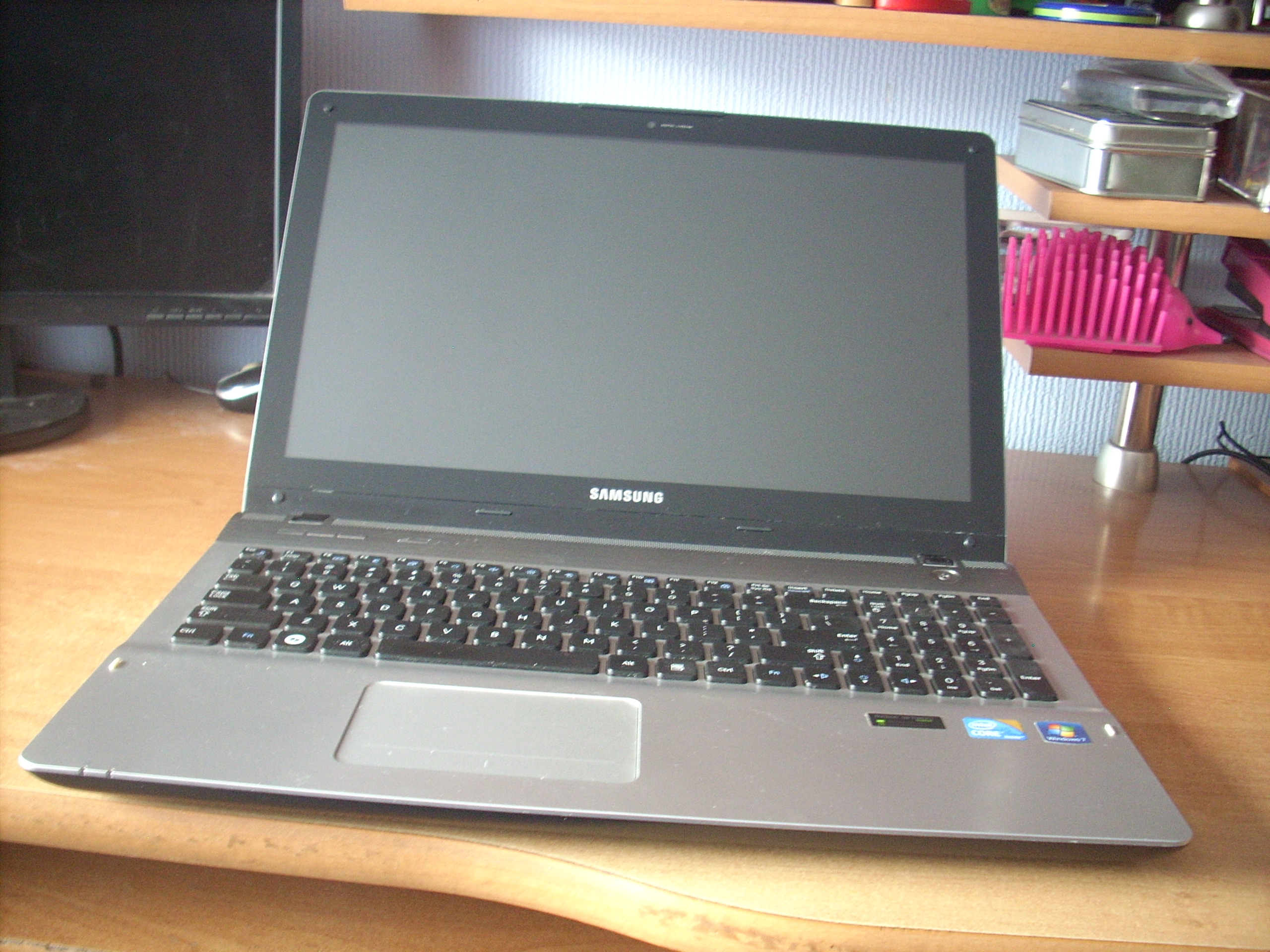
Samsung QX513

	QX310	QX311	QX410	QX411	QX412	QX510	QX511
Announced							
Operating system	Windows 7						
CPU	Intel Core						
Memory	4GB						
Storage	1TB						
Display	13.3"		14"			15"	
Graphics	Nvidia GeForce 310M (Hybrid)					Nvidia GeForce GT 420M	
Optical drive	Yes						
Camera	Yes						
Connectivity	VGA port, RJ-45 Ethernet, HDMI port, USB 3.0 port, 3x USB 2.0 ports, headphone/microphone jack, SD card slot						
Power	90 W						
Dimensions	13.7" x 1.07" x 9.7"						
Mass	4.98 lbs						

=== R Series ===
R- This is the new mainstream line-up after P. It includes somewhat heavier and faster laptops, in fair prices. Its models include R45, R50, R65, etc.(discontinued) or R40(budget Core 2 Duo laptop), R55/R70(high-end), R19/R20. For new Samsung laptops having Core i Series CPUs, they use RF line instead of R line.

	R480	R580	R780	R590
Announced				
Operating system	Windows 7			
CPU	Intel Core			
Memory	4GB			
Storage	500GB			
Display	14"	15"	17"	15"
Graphics	Nvidia GeForce GT 330M			
Optical drive	Yes			
Camera	Yes			
Connectivity	VGA port, RJ-45 Ethernet, HDMI port, USB 3.0 port, 2x USB 2.0 ports, headphone/microphone jack, SD card slot			
Power	60 W			
Dimensions	13.5" x 1.15"-1.45" x 9.4"		16.2" x 1.25"-1.56" x 10.7"	
Mass	4.98 lbs		6.26 lbs	

=== RC Series ===
	RC410	RC420	RC510	RC512	RC710	RC720	RC530	RC730
Announced								
Operating system	Windows 7							
CPU	Intel Core							
Memory	6GB							
Storage	500GB							
Display	14"		15"		17.3"		15"	17.3"
Graphics								
Optical drive	Yes							
Camera	Yes							
Connectivity	VGA port, RJ-45 Ethernet, HDMI port, 2x USB 3.0 ports, USB 2.0 port, headphone/microphone jack, SD card slot							
Power	60 W							
Dimensions	15" x 1.2"-1.4" x 10.1"							16.3" x 1.27"-1.49" x 10.8"
Mass	5.56 lbs							6.4 lbs

=== RF Series ===
As of 2010 and beginning 2011, the RF line sat at the top of the range with the RF710 and RF510 models.

	RF410	RF411	RF510	RF710	RF511	RF711	RF712
Announced							
Operating system	Windows 7						
CPU	Intel Core						
Memory	1GB						4GB
Storage	500GB						640GB
Display	14"		15"	17.3"		17.3"	
Graphics	Nvidia 330M						ATI
Optical drive	Yes						
Camera	Yes						
Connectivity	VGA port, RJ-45 Ethernet, HDMI port, USB 3.0 port, 3x USB 2.0 ports, headphone/microphone jack, SD card slot						VGA port, RJ-45 Ethernet, HDMI port, 2x USB 3.0 ports, 2x USB 2.0 ports, headphone/microphone jack, SD card slot
Power	90 W						
Dimensions	13.5" x 1.15"-1.45" x 9.4"						16.3" x 1.27"-1.49" x 10.8"
Mass	4.98 lbs						6.4 lbs

=== RV Series ===
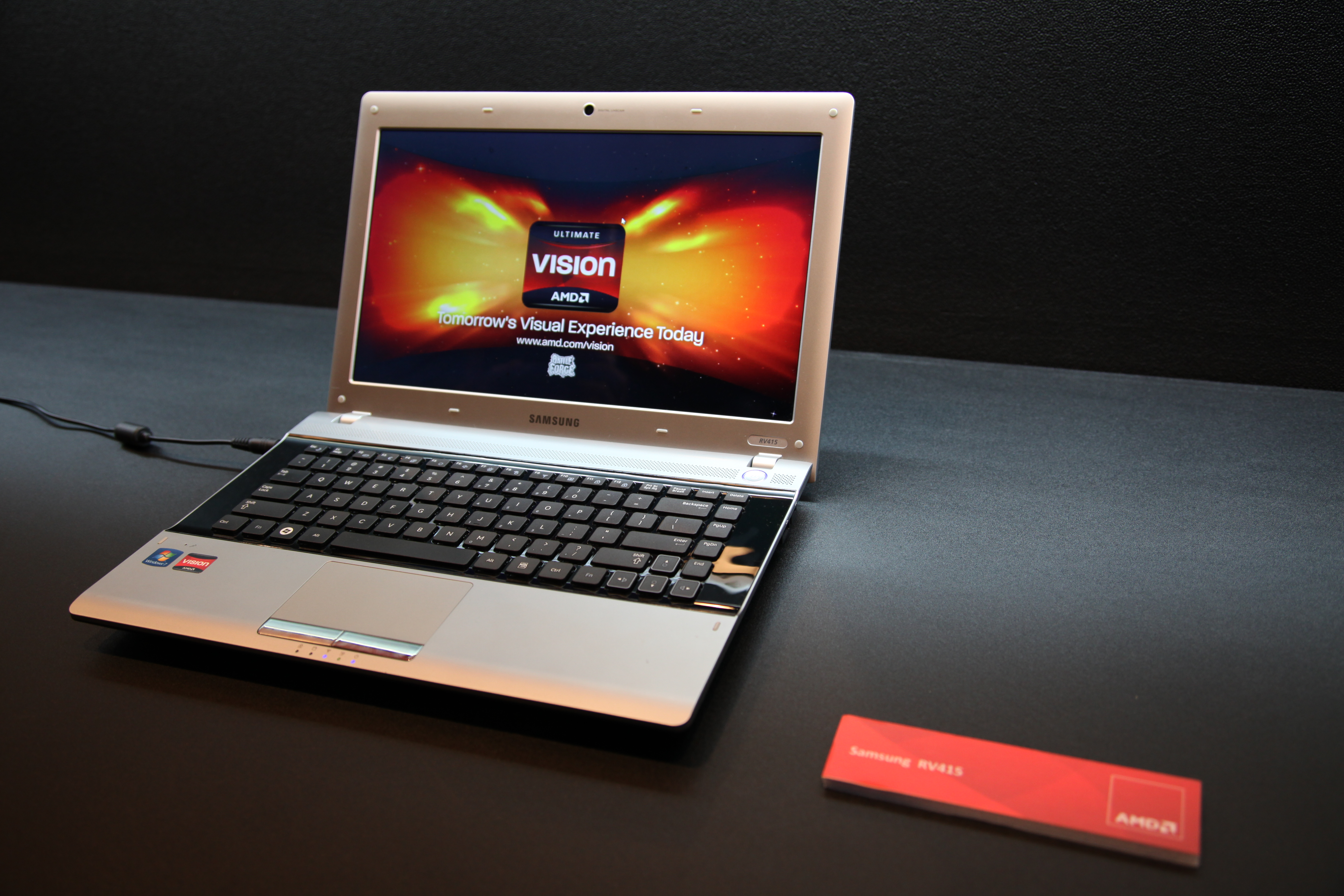
Samsung RV415 at Computex Taiwan 2011

	RV409	RV411	RV413	RV415	RV511	RV515	RV420	RV520	RV711	RV720
Announced										
Operating system	Windows 7									
CPU	Intel Core		AMD Vision		Intel Core	AMD Vision	Intel Core			
Memory	4GB									
Storage	500GB									
Display	14"				15"		14"	15"	17"	
Graphics										
Optical drive	Yes									
Camera	Yes									
Connectivity	VGA port, RJ-45 Ethernet, HDMI port, 3x USB 2.0 ports, headphone/microphone jack, SD card slot									
Power	60 W									
Dimensions	13.5" x 1.15"-1.45" x 9.4"				15" x 1.26"-1.37" x 10"				16.5" x 1.13"-1.38" x 10.8"	
Mass	4.98 lbs				5.29 lbs				5.90 lbs	

=== SF Series ===
	SF310	SF311	SF410	SF411	SF510	SF511
Announced						
Operating system	Windows 7					
CPU	Intel Core					
Memory	4GB					
Storage	640GB				500GB	
Display	13"		14"		15"	
Graphics						
Optical drive	Yes					
Camera	Yes					
Connectivity	VGA port, RJ-45 Ethernet, HDMI port, 3x USB 2.0 ports, headphone/microphone jack, SD card slot					
Power	60 W					
Dimensions	13.7" x 1.07" x 9.7		13.6" x 1.05"-1.27" x 9.6"		15" x 1.26"-1.37" x 10"	
Mass	4.98 lbs		4.82 lbs		5.29 lbs	

=== X Series ===
X- This Sens was a thin and light notebook - a kind that shares the characteristics of an ultraportable with exception of being heavier, wider in screen size, and stronger in processing power. It is around 14 inches, such as X06, X1 and X11 (Core 2 Duo). From i-series CPUs, they continue X series with SF series.
