= Samsung Ativ Tab 3 =

Windows 8 tablet by Samsung

- Codename: XE300TZC
- Developer: Samsung Electronics
- Manufacturer: Samsung Electronics
- Product family: Ativ
- Type: Tablet PC
- Released: 1 September 2013 (United Kingdom)
- Operating system: Windows 8
- CPU: 1.8 GHz dual-core Intel Atom Z2760 processor
- Memory: 2 GB
- Storage: 32/64 GB flash memory
- Display: 1366×768 px IPS display
- Input: Multi-touch screen
- Camera: 2.1 MP AF camera with LED flash, 0.9 MP front facing (for video calls)
- Connectivity: Wi-Fi 802.11a/b/g/n, Bluetooth, HDMI (external cable), Bluetooth 4.0, NFC
- Power: 2133 mAh battery
- Predecessor: Samsung Ativ Tab
- Related: Samsung Galaxy Tab 3 10.1; Samsung Galaxy Note 10.1 2014 Edition
- Website: www.samsung.com/global/ativ/ativtab3.html

The Samsung Ativ Tab 3 is a 10.1-inch (26 cm) tablet manufactured by Samsung. The Ativ Tab 3 was announced on June 20, 2013 at the Samsung Premier 2013 event in London, incorporates a dual-core 1.8 GHz Intel Atom Z2760 processor, and runs the Windows 8 operating system.

The incorporation of Windows 8 instead Windows RT operating system of its predecessor has received mostly favourable reviews, the Ativ Tab 3 itself received positive reviews for its lightweight design, its pre-loaded software such as a free Microsoft office suite, and its overall performance for a device positioned as a budget device.

== Hardware ==
The design of the Ativ Tab is relatively similar to its Android-based counterparts (such as the Galaxy Tab 3 10.1 and the Galaxy Note 10.1 2014 Edition)—built using a mixture of plastic and glass. A micro HDMI port and a micro USB port are incorporated into the design, as well as a volume rocker, power button and MicroSD slot are located on the top. A physical Windows button is located directly below the screen. A charging port and headphone jack located on the left edge. The Ativ Tab 3 uses a 10.1-inch (26 cm) IPS display at a resolution of 1366x768. The tablet is available with either 32 GB or 64 GB of internal storage.

== Reception ==
Whilst demoing the device at the Samsung Premier 2013 event, TechRadar praised the Ativ Tab 3's Windows 8 operating system, lightweight design, and the ability to expand its functionality and storage with its S-Pen and keyboard cover package. However, it was also said thought that there is a minimal amount of USB ports which was due to its slim design which was seen as similar only to that of its Android counterparts. Yet overall they deemed the device as "a decent device in its own right".

CNET said that despite not having the lightning speeds of processors such as the Intel i7, the Ativ Tab 3 performs exceptionally well in basic tasks for a budget Windows 8 tablet. The tablet's relatively fast performance, battery life, pre-loaded software, and lightweight design were regarded as positive aspects—despite considering the design itself to be merely recycled from its Android counterparts. The Intel Z2760 chipset used in the Ativ Tab 3 was also judged as an adequate processor for the device noting that its performance was sufficient and responsive in comparison to the chipsets used in competing Windows 8 devices. The addition of the S-Pen and, in some regions, the free Bluetooth keyboard-cover accessory is greatly welcomed in increasing the device's productivity.

== See also ==
- List of Windows 8 devices
- Samsung Ativ
