= Samsung Ativ Tab =

Tablet PC by Samsung

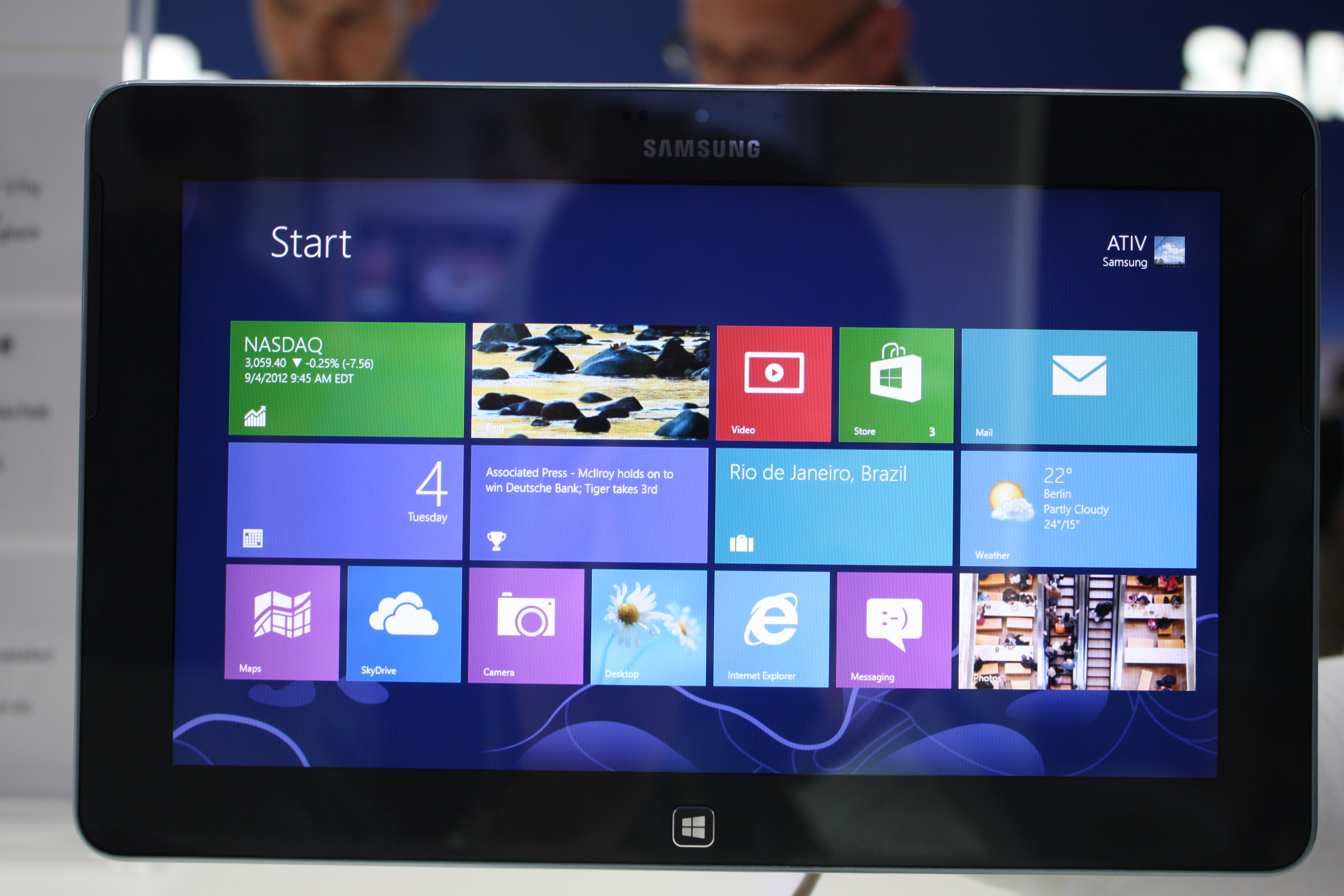
- Developer: Samsung Electronics
- Manufacturer: Samsung Electronics
- Product family: Ativ
- Type: Tablet
- Released: December 14, 2012
- Operating system: Windows RT
- CPU: 1.2 GHz dual-core Qualcomm Snapdragon S4 processor
- Memory: 2 GB
- Storage: 32/64 GB flash memory
- Display: 1366×768 px IPS display
- Input: Multi-touch screen
- Camera: 5.0 MP AF camera with LED flash, 1.9 MP front facing (for video calls)
- Connectivity: Wi-Fi 802.11a/b/g/n, Bluetooth, HDMI (external cable), NFC
- Power: 8200 mAh battery
- Successor: Samsung Ativ Tab 3
- Related: Samsung Galaxy Tab 2 10.1; Samsung Galaxy Note 10.1
- Website: www.samsung.com/ativ

The Samsung Ativ Tab is a 10.1-inch (26 cm) tablet manufactured by Samsung. The Ativ Tab was announced on August 29, 2012 at IFA 2012, incorporates a dual-core 1.2 GHz Qualcomm Snapdragon S4 processor, and runs the Windows RT operating system.

Despite the mixed reception that its Windows RT operating system has received in comparison to Windows 8, the Ativ Tab itself garnered positive reviews for its lightweight design, its ability to use USB peripherals, and its overall performance for a first generation Windows RT device. While the Ativ Tab was released in December 2012 in the United Kingdom, its release in Germany and the United States was cancelled due to the indifferent reception and unclear positioning of Windows RT.

== Hardware ==
The design of the Ativ Tab is relatively similar to its Android-based counterparts (such as the Galaxy Note 10.1)—built using a mixture of plastic and glass. A micro HDMI port, MicroSD slot, and a full-size USB port are incorporated into the design, as well as a volume rocker, power button, and headphone jack located on the top. A physical Windows button is located directly below the screen. A charging port and dock connector are located on the bottom. The Ativ Tab uses a 10.1-inch (26 cm) IPS display at a resolution of 1366x768. The tablet is available with either 32 GB or 64 GB of internal storage.

== Availability ==
The Ativ Tab was originally scheduled for a release in the United Kingdom in November 2012 alongside its Windows Phone 8 counterpart, the Samsung Ativ S, but was delayed into mid-December. The release of both devices was eventually held on December 14, 2012.

In January 2013, Samsung announced that it had cancelled the American release of the Ativ Tab, citing the unclear positioning of the Windows RT operating system, "modest" demand for Windows RT devices, plus the effort and investment required to educate consumers on the differences between Windows 8 and RT as reasons for the move. Mike Abary, senior vice president of Samsung's U.S. PC and tablet businesses, also said that the company was unable to build the Ativ Tab to meet its target price point. The lower cost was intended to be a selling point for Windows RT devices. Samsung has also reportedly planned to pull the Ativ Tab from Germany and other unspecified European markets for similar reasons.

== Reception ==
Whilst demoing the device at IFA, TechRadar praised the Ativ Tab's "crisp" screen, lightweight design, and the ability to expand its functionality and storage with its USB port and MicroSD card slot. However, it was also said that while its processor was relatively responsive, it "certainly wasn't in the same league as the Galaxy Note 2."

Anandtech said that despite not being the best substitute for an actual notebook due to the lagging performance of ARM-based processors and the rushed nature of the OS, the Ativ Tab was "well executed" for a first-generation Windows RT device. The tablet's relatively "snappy" performance, battery life, and lightweight design were regarded as positive aspects—despite considering the design itself to be "nothing particularly new or exciting". The Qualcomm APQ8060A chipset used in the Ativ Tab was also judged as being the best processor for Windows RT so far, noting its performance was sufficient and "surprisingly competitive" in comparison to the chipsets used in competing Windows RT devices. The rear camera was considered to be neither "horrible" or "great", and the lack of keyboard accessory for its dock connector was also noted.

== See also ==
- List of Windows RT devices
- Samsung Ativ S
