= Surface Pro 11th Edition =

Eleventh generation of Microsoft Surface Pro

Surface Pro (11th generation)

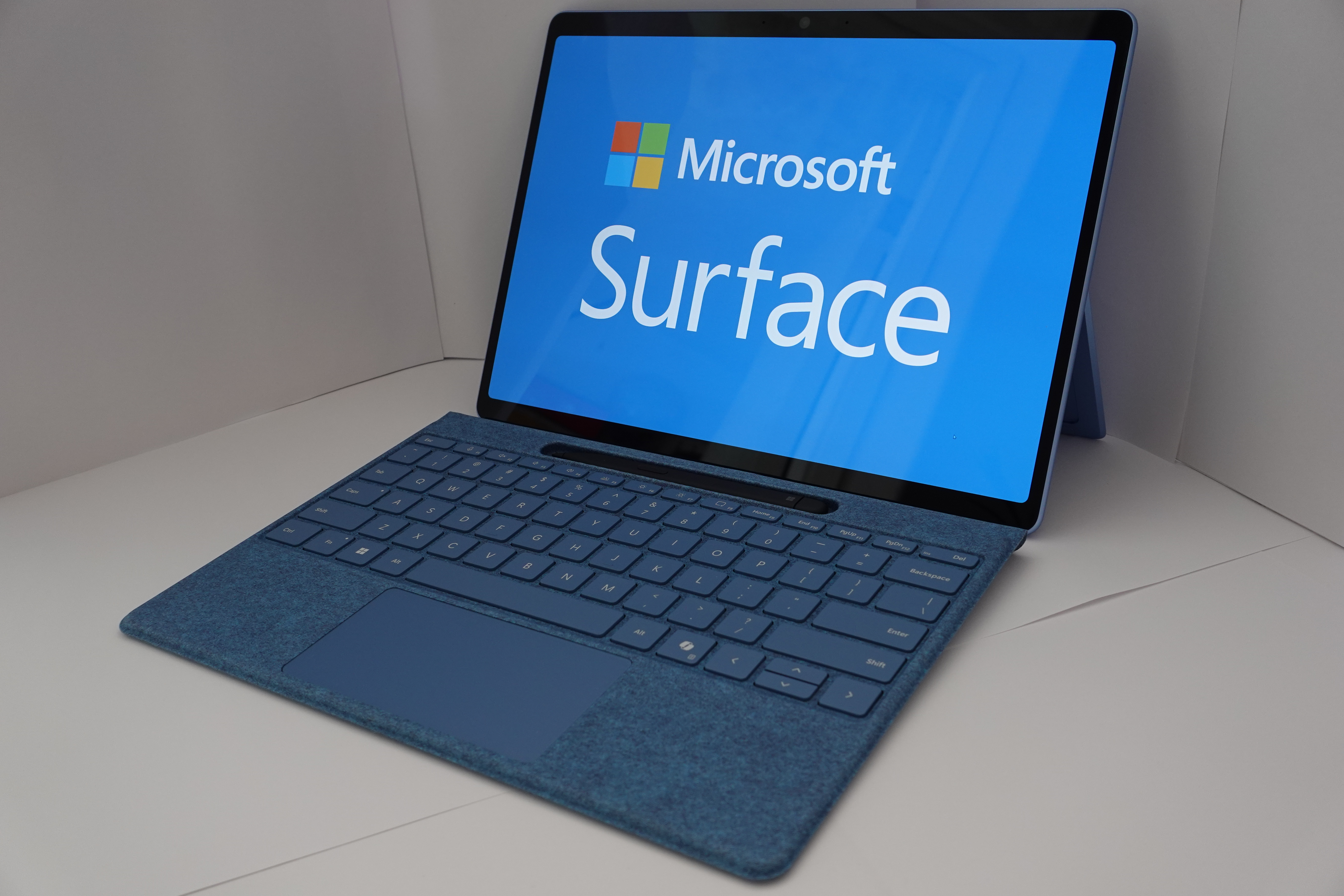
- Surface Pro 11 with Flex Keyboard
- Also known as: Surface Pro 11
- Developer: Microsoft
- Product family: Microsoft Surface
- Type: 2-in-1 detachable
- Generation: Eleventh
- Released: Consumer: 18 June 2024; 2 years ago Business: 30 January 2025; 21 months ago
- Introductory price: Consumer: USD $999 to 2,099; Business: USD $1500 to 2,500
- Operating system: Consumer: Windows 11 Home; Business: Windows 11 Pro
- CPU: Consumer: Qualcomm Snapdragon X Plus; Qualcomm Snapdragon X Elite; Qualcomm Hexagon (NPU); Business: Intel Core Ultra 5 processor (Series 2); Intel Core Ultra 7 processor (Series 2)
- Memory: 16GB, 32GB
- Storage: 256GB, 512GB, 1TB SSD
- Display: 13 inch touchscreen 120 Hz refresh rate PixelSense Display; 2880 × 1920, 266 PPI; 3:2 Aspect Ratio; IPS or OLED
- Graphics: Adreno X1-85 (3.8 TFLOPS)
- Sound: 2W stereo speakers with Dolby Atmos
- Input: Built-in: touchscreen, ambient light sensor, accelerometer, gyroscope, magnetometer, dual far-field studio mics Sold Separately: type cover, mouse, stylus pen, Surface Dial
- Camera: Front: 1440p Quad HD; Rear: 10 MP, 4K
- Touchpad: On the Surface Type Cover (sold separately)
- Connectivity: Wi-Fi 7, Bluetooth 5.4; Consumer: 2× USB-C with USB 40Gbps; Business: 5G; 2× USB-C with USB 40Gbps and Thunderbolt 4
- Online services: Microsoft Store, OneDrive
- Dimensions: 287 mm × 208 mm × 9.3 mm (11.3 in × 8.2 in × 0.37 in)
- Weight: 895 grams (1.973 lb)
- Predecessor: Surface Pro 9 Surface Pro X
- Related: Surface
- Website: www.surface.com

The Surface Pro 11th Edition is a 2-in-1 detachable tablet computer developed by Microsoft to supersede the Surface Pro 9 and Surface Pro X. It was released shortly after the Intel x86-based Surface Pro 10, and unveiled alongside the Surface Laptop (7th generation). The Surface Pro 11 introduced the Qualcomm Snapdragon X series CPUs to the Surface Pro model line, and therefore runs Windows on ARM. It is also the first Surface device with a built-in NPU designed for generative AI, via Microsoft Copilot+.

The business version of the tablet, powered by Intel, was announced on January 30, 2025, alongside the Surface Laptop (7th generation), and was released on February 18, 2025, for the business sector. For the first time, the device will come with a NFC chip.

== Background and reveal ==
Qualcomm announced the Snapdragon X line of CPUs on Oct 10, 2023. Microsoft announced the Surface Pro 11 and Surface Laptop (7th generation) at an AI-related press event on May 20, 2024. The press release touted performance, efficiency, and battery life that would rival the Macbook Air M3, and major performance gains over the Surface Pro 9. The CPU options available are the Snapdragon X Plus with 10 cores, and the Snapdragon X Elite with 12 cores. The devices contain a Hexagon NPU for use with Microsoft Copilot+ generative AI app.

Given the mixed reception of previous Surface on ARM devices, the Snapdragon X family of CPUs sought to provide the best performance, improved battery life, and lower heat output as compared to x86 Surface devices (the latter two still considered pain points of x86 Windows mobile devices). As well as integrate generative AI features and the Hexagon NPU. ARM-native apps have also seen larger support on Windows now than ever before. With the early Surface devices running Windows RT, complaints were lodged regarding the lack of compatible apps on Windows on ARM. The Surface Pro X showed improvements, with the introduction of an x86-compatibility layer to emulate x86 apps. The Surface Pro 11E introduces a new x86 emulator known as Prism, which promises better x86 emulation performance. Presently, Microsoft claims that 90% of total app minutes that users spend in apps now have native ARM versions. Google released Chrome on ARM in 2024 (with Google Drive announced Q3 2024), and Adobe has been rolling out ARM native apps for Photoshop, Illustrator, and Premiere Pro.

== Hardware ==
- The Surface Pro 11 is the 13th overall addition to the Surface Pro line.
- Powered by Qualcomm Snapdragon X CPUs or Intel Core Ultra processor
- Qualcomm ARM-based
  - Qualcomm Adreno integrated GPU (3.8 TFLOPS)
  - Qualcomm Hexagon NPU (45 TOPS)
- Intel x86-based
  - Intel Arc Xe² integrated GPU
  - Intel® AI Boost NPU (40-48 TOPS)
- Up to 1TB of SSD storage, Up to 64GB of memory
- 13-inch touchscreen 2880 x 1920 resolution display at 266 PPI, 3:2 aspect ratio,

and 120 Hz refresh rate, 600 nits brightness, IPS or OLED options available

- Battery life rated at up to 14 hours video playback, 10 hours active web usage

IPS: 48Wh, OLED: 53Wh

- 2× USB-C
  - Consumer: USB 40Gbps with data transfer, charging, and DisplayPort 1.4a
  - Business: USB 40Gbps / Thunderbolt 4 with data transfer, charging, and DisplayPort 2.1
- 5G connectivity option available on business models. Only on Snapdragon models, not Intel models. The older Surface 10 Pro is available with Intel and 5G.
- Surface Connect charging port
- 4K video camera support
- 39W power supply

=== Models ===
- Microsoft Surface Pro 11 Copilot+ (IPS, Snapdragon X Plus)
  - CPU: Snapdragon X Plus (X1P-64-100) • 10x Oryon @ 3.4 GHz
  - GPU: Qualcomm SD X Adreno X1-85 (3.8 TFLOPS)
  - Display: S-IPS 13" (3:2), 2880 x 1920 pixel (266 PPI), HDR, 120 Hz
- Microsoft Surface Pro 11 Copilot+ (OLED, Snapdragon X Elite)
  - CPU: Snapdragon X Elite (X1E-80-100) • 12x Oryon @ 4.0 GHz
  - GPU: Qualcomm SD X Adreno X1-85 (3.8 TFLOPS)
  - Display: OLED 13" (3:2), 2880 x 1920 pixel (266 PPI), HDR, 120 Hz
- Microsoft Surface Pro 11 Copilot+ (IPS, Intel Core Ultra 5 236V)
  - CPU: Intel Core Ultra 5 236V • 2.1 - 4.7 GHz 4P/4E cores (8 MB L3)
  - GPU: Intel Arc Graphics 130V (7 Xe² cores @ 1.85 GHz)
  - Display: IPS 13" (3:2), 2880 x 1920 pixel (266 PPI), VRR 120 Hz
- Microsoft Surface Pro 11 Copilot+ (IPS, Intel Core Ultra 5 238V)
  - CPU: Intel Core Ultra 5 238V • 2.1 - 4.7 GHz 4P/4E cores (8 MB L3)
  - GPU: Intel Arc Graphics 130V (7 Xe² cores @ 1.85 GHz)
  - Display: IPS 13" (3:2), 2880 x 1920 pixel (266 PPI), VRR 120 Hz
- Microsoft Surface Pro 11 Copilot+ (OLED, Intel Core Ultra 7 266V)
  - CPU: Intel Core Ultra 7 266V • 2.2 - 5.0 GHz 4P/4E cores (12 MB L3)
  - GPU: Intel Arc Graphics 140V (8 Xe² cores @ 2.0 GHz)
  - Display: OLED 13" (3:2), 2880 x 1920 pixel (266 PPI), HDR, VRR 120 Hz
- Microsoft Surface Pro 11 Copilot+ (OLED, Intel Core Ultra 7 268V)
  - CPU: Intel Core Ultra 7 268V • 2.2 - 5.0 GHz 4P/4E cores (12 MB L3)
  - GPU: Intel Arc Graphics 140V (8 Xe² cores @ 2.0 GHz)
  - Display: OLED 13" (3:2), 2880 x 1920 pixel (266 PPI), HDR, VRR 120 Hz

== Software ==
Windows 11 includes Microsoft Copilot for AI features. Microsoft Recall, a controversial snapshot search history AI feature was disabled upon launch, and will be opt-in only once it launches. Recall was widely derided upon its reveal, citing security and privacy concerns, prompting Microsoft to make it an opt-in only feature.

== Release and reception ==
The Surface Pro 11 was released on June 18, 2024, and received generally positive reviews. Praises include great performance for regular use, greatly improved battery life, impressive design and form factor, and much improved repairability. John Loeffler of Tech Radar admitted that the SP11 vastly surpassed his own expectations from the year prior, where he scoffed at the idea of another ARM-based Surface Pro being a good idea. Loeffler cites the improved x86 emulation via ‘’Prism’’, the outstanding battery life, OLED display, and performance. He cites it as a worthy competitor to the iPad Pro. Complaints were lodged at the expensive cost of the flex keyboard and Surface Pen (for a device that already has a baseline price of $999). He also feels that the AI features are still rather gimmicky, and that there still needs to be greater adoption of ARM-native apps for the platform.

Ed Bott of ZDNET says that the SP11 has replaced his daily driver tablet after one week of trying it out. He cited how much more cooled and quiet the device is, with his x86 Surface Pro would be uncomfortably hot for after the same amount of time doing the same tasks as he was. Per the battery life, he said that his initial impressions so far coupled with the battery report, indicate that the can get about twice as much battery life than his Surface Pro 9, and on-par with his Macbook Air M2. He was also very impressed with the camera. He said that app compatibility is a mixed bag. Some x86 apps run well, others are still problematic, and that ARM-native apps are gradually rolling out. He noted that at the time of review, Google Drive and popular VPN apps like Proton VPN and ExpressVPN are still only x86, and so users of those apps may want to stick with x86-based devices. He too expressed a mixed reception over the AI features, some felt gimmicky, others added a nice touch to existing apps.

Devindra Hardawar of Engadget cites the SP11 as the best Surface Pro device ever made, in spite of the AI, which he feels is a far less compelling reason to buy the device. While he feels it is overall solid, instead, the great performance of the Snapdragon X chips, great battery life, display, and flex keyboard are the true x-factors at play. He also notes that it can get expensive quickly, and that app compatibility still has its problems.

Tom Warren of The Verge commented on Windows on ARM as a whole. He noted that the Windows on ARM experience has improved dramatically from the Surface Pro X in 2019. Noting popular apps such as Photoshop, DropBox, Spotify, Prime, Hulu, Firefox, Chrome, Vivaldi, Edge, Brave, and Opera are all ARM-native now. He says that after a week, he has not seen the erratic behavior that plagued previous x86 emulation on Windows on ARM, but says it does not measure up quite to Microsoft's claimed performance. Ultimately, it depends on the complexity of the app. And that Qualcomm should engage with app developers on how to best optimize the apps for the hardware, as they cannot rely on Prism to handle everything. He also states that gaming experience is lacking: Some games will not even run, others run at a particularly mid performance, and many anti-cheat software use kernel drivers that are not yet supported by emulation. He ultimately feels that ARM-native app accessibility will only improve within the coming years, and that Windows on ARM finally feels poised to succeed.

== Serviceability and repairability ==
Microsoft has released service guides for Surface Pro 11 and Surface Laptop 7.

iFixit has given both the Surface Pro 11 Surface Laptop 7 an overall rating of 8/10 on the repairability scale. Noting the improvements over previous Surface devices, and the user-removable SSD.

== Timeline ==
Timeline of Surface devices
Sources: Microsoft Devices Blog Microsoft Surface Store Microsoft Surface for Business store

== Notes ==
Preceded by Surface Pro 10	Surface Pro; 11th generation With: Surface Laptop (7th generation)	Succeeded by TBA
