= Surface Laptop 5 =

Laptop computer developed by Microsoft

- Developer: Microsoft
- Product family: Microsoft Surface
- Type: Laptop
- Generation: Fifth
- Predecessor: Surface Laptop 4
- Successor: Surface Laptop 6
- Related: Surface Laptop Studio
- Website: microsoft.com

The Microsoft Surface Laptop 5 is a laptop computer developed by Microsoft to replace the outgoing Surface Laptop 4. The device was announced on October 12, 2022, alongside the Surface Pro 9 and Surface Studio 2+. Key differences from its predecessor include newer Intel Alder Lake processors, support for Thunderbolt 4, the removal of AMD configuration options, and the replacement of the Ice Blue fabric finish option with the Sage metal option. The laptop comes preinstalled with the Windows 11 operating system.

== Hardware ==
- Powered by Evo 12th Generation Intel Core only.
- Up to 18 hours of battery with the 13-inch model and up to 17 hours with the 15-inch model.
- 13-inch and 15-inch touchscreen with 3:2 aspect ratio, and 60 Hz refresh rate
- USB-A and USB-C port with Thunderbolt 4
- Up to 1 TB of SSD storage, with no microSD slot for expansion
- Up to 32 GB of memory

== Technical specifications ==
From Microsoft's website. Some sections are modified.

| Feature | Specification |
|---|---|
| Processor | Surface Laptop 5 13.5”: Intel® Core™ i5-1235U processor Intel® Core™ i7-1255U processor Surface Laptop 5 15”: Intel® Core™ i7-1255U processor |
| Graphics | Intel® Iris® Xe Graphics |
| Memory and Storage | Surface Laptop 5 13.5” 8 GB, 16 GB LPDDR5x RAM Removable solid-state drive (SSD) options: 256 GB, 512 GB Surface Laptop 5 15” 8 GB, 16 GB, or 32 GB LPDDR5x RAM Removable solid-state drive (SSD) options: 256 GB, 512 GB, or 1 TB |
| Display | Surface Laptop 5 13.5”: Screen: 13.5” PixelSense™ Display Resolution: 2256 x 1504 (201 PPI) Aspect ratio: 3:2 Contrast ratio 1300:1 Color profile: sRGB, and Vivid Individually color-calibrated display Dolby Vision IQ™ support Touch: 10-point multi-touch Gorilla® Glass 3 display on laptop with Alcantara® palm rest Gorilla® Glass 5 display on laptop with metal palm rest Surface Laptop 5 15”: Screen: 15” PixelSense™ Display Resolution: 2496 x 1664 (201 PPI) Aspect ratio: 3:2 Contrast ratio 1300:1 Color profile: sRGB, and Vivid Individually color-calibrated display Dolby Vision IQ™ support Touch: 10-point multi-touch Gorilla® Glass 5 |
| Battery | Surface Laptop 5 13.5”: Up to 18 hours of typical device usage Surface Laptop 5 15”: Up to 17 hours of typical device usage |
| Size and Weight | Surface Laptop 5 13.5”: Length: 12.1” (308 mm) Width: 8.8” (223 mm) Height: 0.57” (14.5 mm) Weight: Fabric: 2.80 lbs (1.272 kg) Metal: 2.86 lbs (1.297 kg) Surface Laptop 5 15”: Length: 13.4” (340 mm) Width: 9.6” (244 mm) Height: 0.58” (14.7 mm) Weight: 3.44 lbs (1.545 kg) |
| Security | Firmware TPM 2.0 Windows Hello face sign-in |
| Video/Cameras | Windows Hello Face Authentication camera 720p HD front-facing camera |
| Audio | Omnisonic® Speakers with Dolby® Atmos™ |
| Mics | Dual far-field Studio microphones |
| Connections | 1 x USB-C port with USB 40Gbps / Thunderbolt 4 1 x USB-A port with USB 5Gbps 1 x Surface Connect port 3.5 mm headphone jack |
| Network and connectivity | Wi-Fi 6, Bluetooth 5.1 |
| Pen and accessories compatibility | Designed for Surface Pen Compatible with Microsoft Pen Protocol (MPP) |
| Software | Windows 11 Home Preloaded Microsoft 365 Apps Microsoft 365 Family 30-day trial Xbox Game Pass Ultimate 30-day trial |
| Accessibility | Compatible with Surface Adaptive Kit Compatible with Microsoft Adaptive Accessories |
| Sustainability | Meets ENERGY STAR® requirements Registered EPEAT® Gold in the US and Canada |
| Exterior | Casing: Aluminum Power and Volume buttons on keyboard Surface Laptop 5 13.5” colors: Platinum with Alcantara® material palm rest Matte Black with metal palm rest Sage with metal palm rest Sandstone with metal palm rest Surface Laptop 5 15” colors: Platinum with metal palm rest Matte Black with metal palm rest |
| Sensors | Ambient light sensor |
| What’s in the box | Surface Laptop 5 13.5” and 15”: Power Supply Quick Start Guide Safety and warranty documents |
| Keyboard Compatibility | Activation: Moving keys Backlight Layout: English, full row of function keys (F1 – F12) Windows key and dedicated buttons for media controls, screen brightness |
| Warranty | 1-year limited hardware warranty |

== Timeline ==
Timeline of Surface devices
Sources: Microsoft Devices Blog Microsoft Surface Store Microsoft Surface for Business store

| Preceded by Surface Laptop 4 | Surface Laptop 5; 5th generation | Succeeded by Surface Laptop 6 |
