= Color bleeding =

Color bleeding may refer to:

- Color bleeding (computer graphics), an effect in 3D rendering where objects cast a hue onto other objects
- Color bleeding (printing), the effect of areas of colored inks or dyes spreading into unwanted areas

== See also ==
- Color
- Bleeding (disambiguation)
