= Surface Laptop 7th Edition =

2024 laptop by Microsoft

Surface Laptop (7th generation)

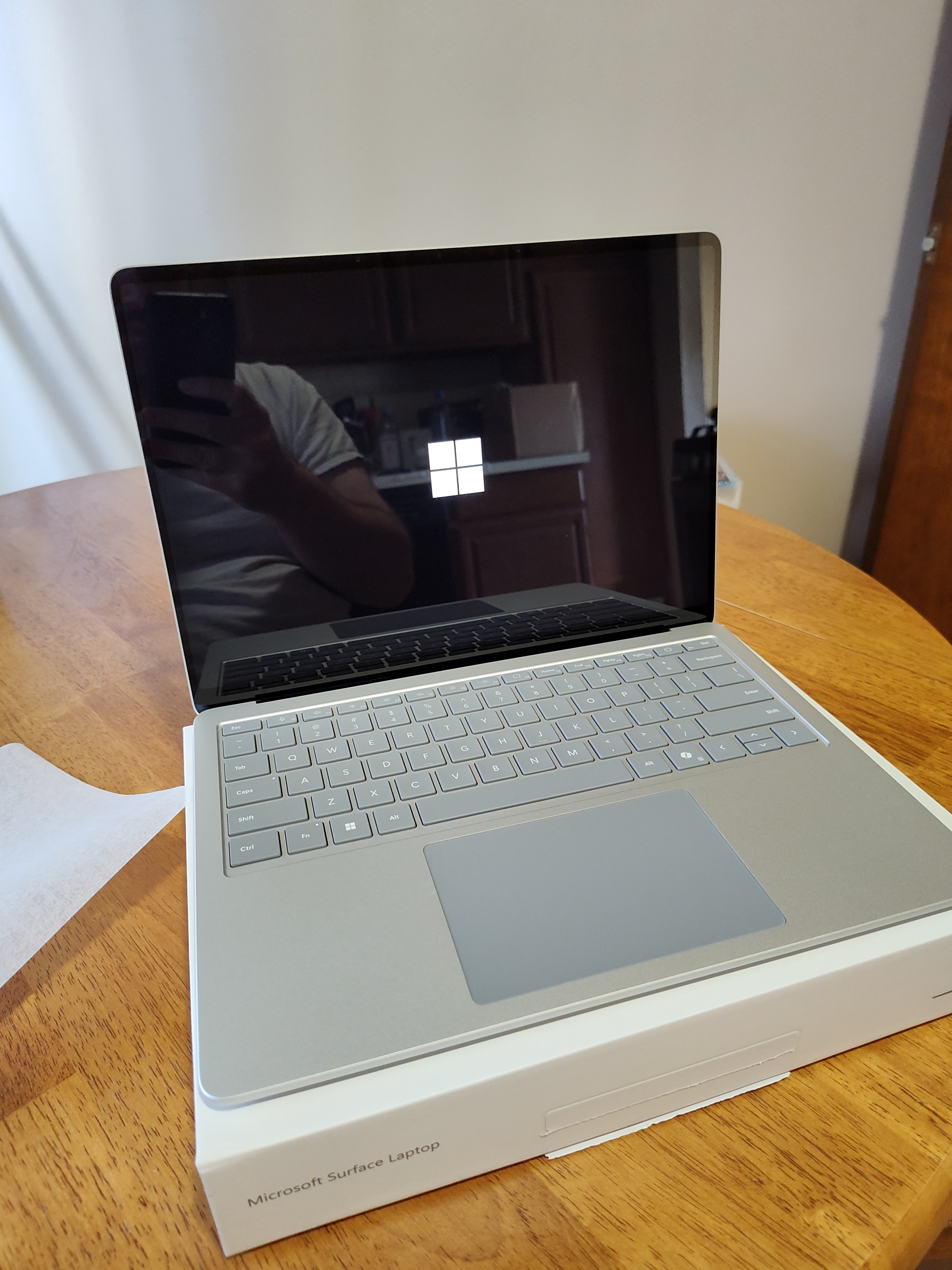
- Surface Laptop (7th generation) 13.8" Platinum edition
- Developer: Microsoft
- Product family: Microsoft Surface
- Type: Laptop
- Generation: Seventh
- Released: Consumer: 18 June 2024; 2 years ago Business: 30 January 2025; 21 months ago
- Introductory price: 15": USD $1299 - 2,499; 13.8": USD $999 - 2,499
- Operating system: Windows 11 Home; Upgradeable to Windows 11 Pro
- CPU: Consumer: Qualcomm Snapdragon X Plus or Qualcomm Snapdragon X Elite; Qualcomm Hexagon (NPU) Business: Intel Core Ultra 5 Processor or Intel Core Ultra 7 Processor
- Memory: 16 GB, 32 GB, 64 GB RAM
- Storage: 1 TB, 512 GB, 256 GB
- Removable storage: Removable SSD
- Display: PixelSense Flow Touchscreen; 3:2 Aspect Ratio; 15": 2496 x 1664, 201 PPI; 13.8": 2304 x 1536, (201 ppi)
- Graphics: Adreno
- Sound: Omnisonic Speakers with Dolby Audio, 3.5 mm headphone jack, dual far-field studio mics
- Input: Built in: touchscreen, ambient light sensor, keyboard, touchpad Sold Separately: mouse, (Does not support stylus pen)
- Camera: 1080p HD front facing Studio camera
- Touchpad: Built in
- Connectivity: 15":Bluetooth 5.4, Wi-Fi 7, USB-C, USB-A, microSDXC, Surface Connect; 13.8":Bluetooth 5.4, Wi-Fi 7, USB-C, USB-A, Surface Connect
- Power: 15": 65W; 13.8": 39W
- Online services: Microsoft Store, OneDrive
- Dimensions: 15": 329 x 239 x 18.29 mm (12.96 x 9.41 x 0.72 in); 13.8": 301 x 220 x 17.5 mm (11.85 x 8.67 x 0.69 in)
- Weight: 15": 1,664 grams (3.668 lb); 13.8": 1,342 grams (2.959 lb)
- Predecessor: Surface Laptop 6
- Related: Surface
- Website: www.surface.com

The Surface Laptop 7th Edition is a laptop computer developed by Microsoft. It is the seventh generation of Surface Laptop, and was unveiled alongside the 11th-generation Surface Pro. It is the first Surface Laptop released for Windows on ARM. It is also the first Surface Laptop with a built-in NPU designed for generative AI, via Microsoft Copilot+.

The business version of the laptop, powered by Intel, was announced on January 30, 2025, alongside the Surface Pro 11, and is set to be released on February 18, 2025, for the business sector. For the first time, the device will come with a 5G connectivity.

== Background and reveal ==
Qualcomm announced the Snapdragon X line of CPUs on Oct 10, 2023. As they did with Microsoft, they partnered with several manufacturers such as HP, Dell, Lenovo, Asus, and Samsung to release Windows laptops powered by the ARM-based CPUs.

Microsoft announced the Surface Laptop 7 and Surface Pro 11 at an AI-related press event on May 20, 2024. The press release touted performance, efficiency, and battery life that would rival the Macbook Air M3, and major performance gains over the Surface Pro 9. The Surface Laptop 7 was announced in two form factors and four colors: 15” and 13.8” display; and colors sapphire, dune, platinum, and black. The CPU options available are the Snapdragon X Plus with 10 cores, and the Snapdragon X Elite with 12 cores. The devices contain a Hexagon NPU for use with Microsoft Copilot+ generative AI app.

While Windows on ARM has existed since Windows RT and the first generation Surface tablet in 2012, the devices and OS were met with a mixed critical reception, and failed to be widely adopted by consumers. The Nvidia Tegra 3 SoC was considered underwhelming, and Windows RT lacked a practical amount of apps. This was due to low ARM-native app availability, and no x86 emulation to run x86-based apps. Subsequent ARM based Surface devices include the Surface 2 (Nvidia Tegra 4), Surface Pro X, and as an option for the Surface Pro 9 (both Microsoft SQ). The latter two devices were initially released with the ARM variants of Windows 10 and Windows 11 respectively, and included a built-in x86 emulator for app support. The performance was improved over early Surface devices, and had more impressive battery life than x86-based Surface tablets.

With Apple's transition to Apple Silicon in 2020, ARM was seen as an increasingly viable option for laptop and desktop PCs, no longer being tied largely to just mobile phones and tablets. The Snapdragon X family of CPUs sought to provide the best performance, improved battery life, and lower heat output as compared to x86 Surface devices (the latter two still considered pain points of x86 Windows mobile devices), as well as integrate generative AI features and the Hexagon NPU. ARM-native apps have also seen larger support on Windows now than ever before. Microsoft claims that 90% of total app minutes that users spend in apps now have native ARM versions. Google released Chrome on ARM in 2024, and Adobe has been rolling out ARM native apps for Photoshop, Illustrator, and Premiere Pro.

The new version of the x86 compatibility layer included in the Windows 11 24H2 update was named Prism, and was claimed to offer major performance improvements over the previous compatibility layers in Surface on ARM devices.

== Hardware and features ==
- 1st gen Qualcomm Snapdragon X Plus or Snapdragon X Elite processor
- Qualcomm Adreno integrated graphics processor
- Qualcomm Hexagon neural processor
- Memory options are 64 GB, 32 GB, and 16 GB
- Storage options are 1 TB, 512 GB, and 256 GB
- Factory calibrated IPS-type sRGB display with 600 nits peak brightness
  - 13.8": 2304 x 1536 (201 PPI) resolution, 1400:1 contrast ratio
  - 15": 2496 x 1664 (201 PPI) resolution, 1300:1 contrast ratio
- 3.5 mm headphone jack
- 2× USB-C
  - Intel: USB 40Gbps / Thunderbolt 4 with data transfer, charging, and DisplayPort 2.1
  - Snapdragon: USB 40Gbps with data transfer, charging, and DisplayPort 1.4a
- 1× USB-A port with USB 10Gbps
- microSDXC card reader (15" model only)
- Battery specifications:
  - 13.8": 54 Wh nominal battery capacity, 20 hours rated battery life
  - 15": 66 Wh nominal battery capacity, 22 hours rated battery life
- Surface Connect charging port
- No longer support Surface Pen

== Intel configurations ==
Price (USD)	Screen	CPU	RAM	SSD	Connectivity	Color
$1,499.99	13.8 inch	Core Ultra 5 236V	16 GB	256 GB	Wi-Fi	Platinum / Black
$1,599.99	13.8 inch	Core Ultra 5 236V	16 GB	512 GB	Wi-Fi	Platinum / Black
$1,799.99	13.8 inch	Core Ultra 5 238V	32 GB	256 GB	Wi-Fi	Platinum / Black
$1,999.99	13.8 inch	Core Ultra 5 238V	32 GB	512 GB	Wi-Fi	Platinum / Black
$1,699.99	13.8 inch	Core Ultra 7 266V	16 GB	256 GB	Wi-Fi	Platinum / Black
$1,799.99	13.8 inch	Core Ultra 7 266V	16 GB	512 GB	Wi-Fi	Platinum / Black
$1,999.99	13.8 inch	Core Ultra 7 268V	32 GB	256 GB	Wi-Fi	Platinum / Black
$2,199.99	13.8 inch	Core Ultra 7 268V	32 GB	512 GB	Wi-Fi	Platinum / Black
$2,399.99	13.8 inch	Core Ultra 7 268V	32 GB	1 TB	Wi-Fi	Platinum / Black
$1,799.99	13.8 inch	Core Ultra 5 236V	16 GB	256 GB	Wi-Fi + 5G	Platinum
$2,099.99	13.8 inch	Core Ultra 5 238V	32 GB	256 GB	Wi-Fi + 5G	Platinum
$1,999.99	13.8 inch	Core Ultra 7 266V	16 GB	256 GB	Wi-Fi + 5G	Platinum
$2,299.99	13.8 inch	Core Ultra 7 268V	32 GB	256 GB	Wi-Fi + 5G	Platinum
$2,499.99	13.8 inch	Core Ultra 7 268V	32 GB	512 GB	Wi-Fi + 5G	Platinum
$2,699.99	13.8 inch	Core Ultra 7 268V	32 GB	1 TB	Wi-Fi + 5G	Platinum
$1,699.99	15 inch	Core Ultra 5 236V	16 GB	256 GB	Wi-Fi	Platinum / Black
$1,799.99	15 inch	Core Ultra 5 236V	16 GB	512 GB	Wi-Fi	Platinum / Black
$1,999.99	15 inch	Core Ultra 5 238V	32 GB	256 GB	Wi-Fi	Platinum / Black
$2,199.99	15 inch	Core Ultra 5 238V	32 GB	512 GB	Wi-Fi	Platinum / Black
$1,899.99	15 inch	Core Ultra 7 266V	16 GB	256 GB	Wi-Fi	Platinum / Black
$1,999.99	15 inch	Core Ultra 7 266V	16 GB	512 GB	Wi-Fi	Platinum / Black
$2,199.99	15 inch	Core Ultra 7 268V	32 GB	256 GB	Wi-Fi	Platinum / Black
$2,399.99	15 inch	Core Ultra 7 268V	32 GB	512 GB	Wi-Fi	Platinum / Black
$2,599.99	15 inch	Core Ultra 7 268V	32 GB	1 TB	Wi-Fi	Platinum / Black

== Software ==
Surface Laptop 7 models ship with a pre-installed 64-bit version of Windows 11 Home (which may be upgraded to Pro for a fee) and a trial of Office 365. Windows 11 24H2 includes an updated x86 emulator, now called Prism. Similar to Rosetta 2 on Apple Silicon, this is a compatibility layer which allows x86-based applications to run on the ARM instruction set, to address apps that have not yet seen ARM-native releases.

Windows 11 includes Microsoft Copilot for AI features. Microsoft Recall, a controversial snapshot search history AI feature was disabled upon launch, and will be opt-in only once it launches. Recall was widely derided upon its reveal, citing security and privacy concerns, prompting Microsoft to make it an opt-in only feature.

== Release and reception ==
The Surface Laptop 7 was released on June 18, 2024, and received generally positive reviews. Allisa James of Tech Radar cited great performance, battery life, display, and keyboard. She said that the Snapdragon X processors handle the daily workload quite well, the battery got about 15 hours off of regular usage, and 10 hours off of Tech Radar's video playback test. While also stating that it has middling port selection, and should have an OLED option available. She gives an overall rating of 4.88/5.0. Saying to buy it if you want great performance and battery life, but to avoid if you want better port selection or want a gaming laptop.

Tom Warren of The Verge considers the SL7 the best competitor to the MacBook Air, and that Microsoft has closed the gap between the two brands, and raised the bar for expectations for a Microsoft laptop. He cited great battery life, overall performance for most apps, and the default 16GB configuration as positives, but notes that gaming support is limited, AI feels gimmicky, and x86 emulation will hit the battery and performance of the laptop. He was initially skeptical of the baseline $999 model, but decided to keep it, given the impressive battery life. He also noted the improved bezels, 1080p camera, and haptic touchpad. He said that performance in ARM-native apps was comparable to any given x86 laptop, but that using x86 apps and the emulation will have a mixed reception, while apps like Discord have noticeably improved with the use of “Prism”. The device also ran pretty cool, with fans only spinning up during benchmark tests, and that “even at full speed, they’re not unbearable”.

Warren also commented on Windows on ARM as a whole. He noted that the Windows on ARM experience has improved dramatically from the Surface Pro X in 2019. Noting popular apps such as Photoshop, DropBox, Spotify, Prime, Hulu, Firefox, Chrome, Vivaldi, Edge, Brave, and Opera are all ARM-native now. He says that after a week, he has not seen the erratic behavior that plagued previous x86 emulation on Windows on ARM, but says it does not measure up quite to Microsoft's claimed performance. Ultimately, it depends on the complexity of the app. And that Qualcomm should engage with app developers on how to best optimize the apps for the hardware, as they cannot rely on Prism to handle everything. He also states that gaming experience is lacking: Some games will not even run, others run at a particularly mid performance, and many anti-cheat software use kernel drivers that are not yet supported by ARM. He ultimately feels that ARM-native app accessibility will only improve within the coming years, and that Windows on ARM finally feels poised to succeed.

Matthew S. Smith of PC World likewise cited the great battery life, performance in every day use, and overall form factor as positives for the Surface Laptop 7. He said that gaming performance is not very good (gamers should generally steer clear), was not impressed with the keyboard compared to other laptops, and also cited the lack of an OLED option. He too cited improved bezels, great touchpad, and great 1080p webcam.

== Serviceability and repairability ==
Microsoft has released service guides for Surface Laptop 7 and Surface Pro 11.

iFixit has given both the Surface Laptop 7 and Surface Pro 11 an overall rating of 8/10 on the repairability scale. Noting the improvements over previous Surface devices, the user-removable SSD, and (for the Surface Laptop) the ease of removing the bottom cover and access of the battery, but lamented on the soldered-on RAM.

== Timeline ==
Timeline of Surface devices
Sources: Microsoft Devices Blog Microsoft Surface Store Microsoft Surface for Business store

Preceded by Surface Laptop 6	Surface Laptop; 7th generation With: Surface Pro (11th generation)	Succeeded by
