= Lines per inch =

Lines per inch (LPI) is a measurement of printing resolution. A line consists of halftones that is built up by physical ink dots made by the printer device to create different tones. Specifically LPI is a measure of how close together the lines in a halftone grid are. The quality of printer device or screen determines how high the LPI will be. High LPI indicates greater detail and sharpness.

Printed magazines and newspapers often use a halftone system. Typical newsprint paper is not very dense, and has relatively high dot gain or color bleeding, so newsprint is usually around 85 LPI. Higher-quality paper, such as that used in commercial magazines, has less dot gain, and can range up to 300 LPI with quality glossy (coated) paper.

In order to effectively utilize the entire range of available LPI in a halftone system, an image selected for printing generally must have 1.5 to 2 times as many samples per inch (SPI). For instance, if the target output device is capable of printing at 100 LPI, an optimal range for a source image would be 150 to 200 SPI. Using fewer SPI than this would not make full use of the printer's available LPI; using more SPI than this would exceed the capability of the printer, and quality would be effectively lost.

Another device that uses the LPI specification is the graphics tablet.

== Conversion to DPI ==
Conversion of the LPI to the DPI is done by simple multiplication:

150 LPI x 2 = 300 DPI

== Conversion between Lines per inch and Lines per cm ==
Countries using the metric system tend to use lines per centimeter (L/cm).

In order to convert between L/in and L/cm the following formulas can be used:

Lines per inch to lines per cm: L/cm = 0.394 x L/in

i.e. 254 L/in = 100 L/cm

Lines per cm to lines per inch: L/in = 2.54 x L/cm

i.e. 100 L/cm = 254 L/in

== See also ==
- Display resolution
- Dots per inch
- Pixels per inch
- Samples per inch
