= Surface Pro 10 =

Laptop computer developed by Microsoft

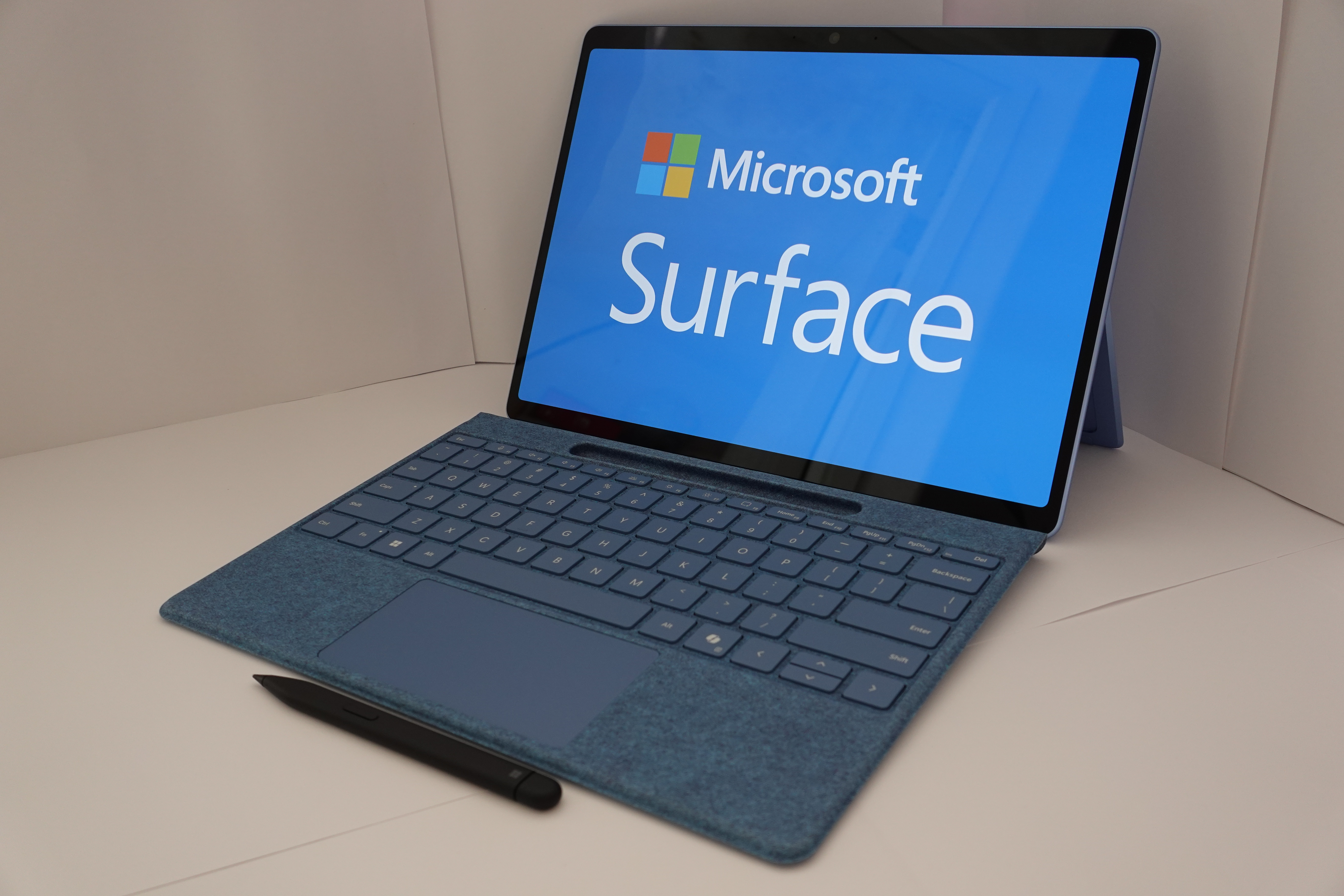
- Surface Pro 10 with keyboard & stylus
- Developer: Microsoft
- Product family: Microsoft Surface
- Type: 2-in-1 detachable
- Generation: Tenth
- Predecessor: Surface Pro 9
- Successor: Surface Pro 11th Edition
- Website: microsoft.com

The Microsoft Surface Pro 10 is a 2-in-1 detachable tablet computer developed by Microsoft, succeeding the Surface Pro 9. The device was announced on March 21, 2024, alongside the Surface Laptop 6 and released on April 9, 2024.

The Surface Pro 10 was marketed primarily as a business-focused device, the Surface Pro 10 features Intel Core Ultra (Meteor Lake) processors and was the first in the line to include a dedicated NPU for artificial intelligence tasks through the Intel AI Boost engine. A business-specific version of the Surface Pro 11, featuring Intel Core Ultra (Series 2) processors, was announced on January 30, 2025, and began shipping on February 18, 2025. This model was designed to offer x86 compatibility and enhanced security features, such as a built-in NFC reader, for enterprise customers.

In May 2025, Microsoft expanded the Surface with a line 12-inch variant of the Surface Pro, designed as a companion to the 13-inch flagship. Released on May 20, 2025, the device features a redesigned fanless aluminum chassis with rounded edges, weighing approximately 1.5 lbs (686 g).

== Features ==
=== AI features and Copilot+ branding ===
The Surface Pro 10 and Surface Laptop 6 were marketed by Microsoft as the "first Surface PCs optimized for AI," featuring Intel Core Ultra processors with a dedicated NPU. These devices introduced a dedicated Copilot key on the keyboard, replacing the Menu key (or the right Control key in some layouts) to provide one-touch access to the Microsoft Copilot assistant.

In May 2024, Microsoft expanded this vision with the introduction of the Copilot+ PC standard. The subsequent Surface Pro 11 and Surface Laptop 7 became the first Surface devices to meet these updated hardware requirements, including an NPU capable of over 40 TOPS. These "Copilot+" models support advanced on-device AI features not available on the Pro 10, such as Windows Recall with a searchable activity timeline, Cocreator for local image generation, and Live Captions with real-time translation.

== Hardware ==
Surface Pro 10 configuration options
CPU	Integrated GPU	NPU	RAM	Internal storage	Colors	Price in USD
Intel Core Ultra 5 processor 135U	Intel Graphics (4 Xe cores 1.9 GHz)	Intel AI Boost	8 GB	256 GB	Platinum, Black	$1199
Intel Core Ultra 5 processor 135U	Intel Graphics (4 Xe cores 1.9 GHz)	Intel AI Boost	16 GB	256 GB	Platinum, Black	$1499
Intel Core Ultra 5 processor 135U	Intel Graphics (4 Xe cores 1.9 GHz)	Intel AI Boost	16 GB	512 GB	Platinum, Black	$1599
Intel Core Ultra 5 processor 135U	Intel Graphics (4 Xe cores 1.9 GHz)	Intel AI Boost	32 GB	256 GB	Platinum	$1799
Intel Core Ultra 5 processor 135U	Intel Graphics (4 Xe cores 1.9 GHz)	Intel AI Boost	32 GB	512 GB	Platinum	$1999
Intel® Core Ultra 7 processor 165U	Intel Graphics (4 Xe cores 2 GHz)	Intel AI Boost	16 GB	256 GB	Platinum, Black	$1699
Intel® Core Ultra 7 processor 165U	Intel Graphics (4 Xe cores 2 GHz)	Intel AI Boost	16 GB	512 GB	Platinum, Black	$1799
Intel® Core Ultra 7 processor 165U	Intel Graphics (4 Xe cores 2 GHz)	Intel AI Boost	16 GB	1 TB	Platinum	$1999
Intel® Core Ultra 7 processor 165U	Intel Graphics (4 Xe cores 2 GHz)	Intel AI Boost	32 GB	256 GB	Platinum	$1999
Intel® Core Ultra 7 processor 165U	Intel Graphics (4 Xe cores 2 GHz)	Intel AI Boost	32 GB	512 GB	Platinum	$2199
Intel® Core Ultra 7 processor 165U	Intel Graphics (4 Xe cores 2 GHz)	Intel AI Boost	32 GB	1 TB	Platinum	$2399
Intel® Core Ultra 7 processor 165U	Intel Graphics (4 Xe cores 2 GHz)	Intel AI Boost	64 GB	1 TB	Platinum	$2799

== Timeline ==
Timeline of Surface devices
Sources: Microsoft Devices Blog Microsoft Surface Store Microsoft Surface for Business store

Preceded by Surface Pro 9	Surface Pro; 10th generation	Succeeded by Surface Pro
