= Quartan prime =

In mathematics, a quartan prime is a prime number of the form x^{4} + y^{4} where x and y are positive integers. Odd quartan primes are of the form 16n + 1.

For example, 17 is the smallest odd quartan prime: 1^{4} + 2^{4} = 1 + 16 = 17.

With the exception of 2 (x = y = 1), one of x and y will be odd, and the other even. If both are odd or both are even, the result will be even, and 2 is the only even prime.

The first few quartan primes are:

2, 17, 97, 257, 337, 641, 881, … (sequence A002645 in the OEIS).

== See also ==
- Fourth power
- Quartic
