= Surface Studio =

All-in-one PC by Microsoft

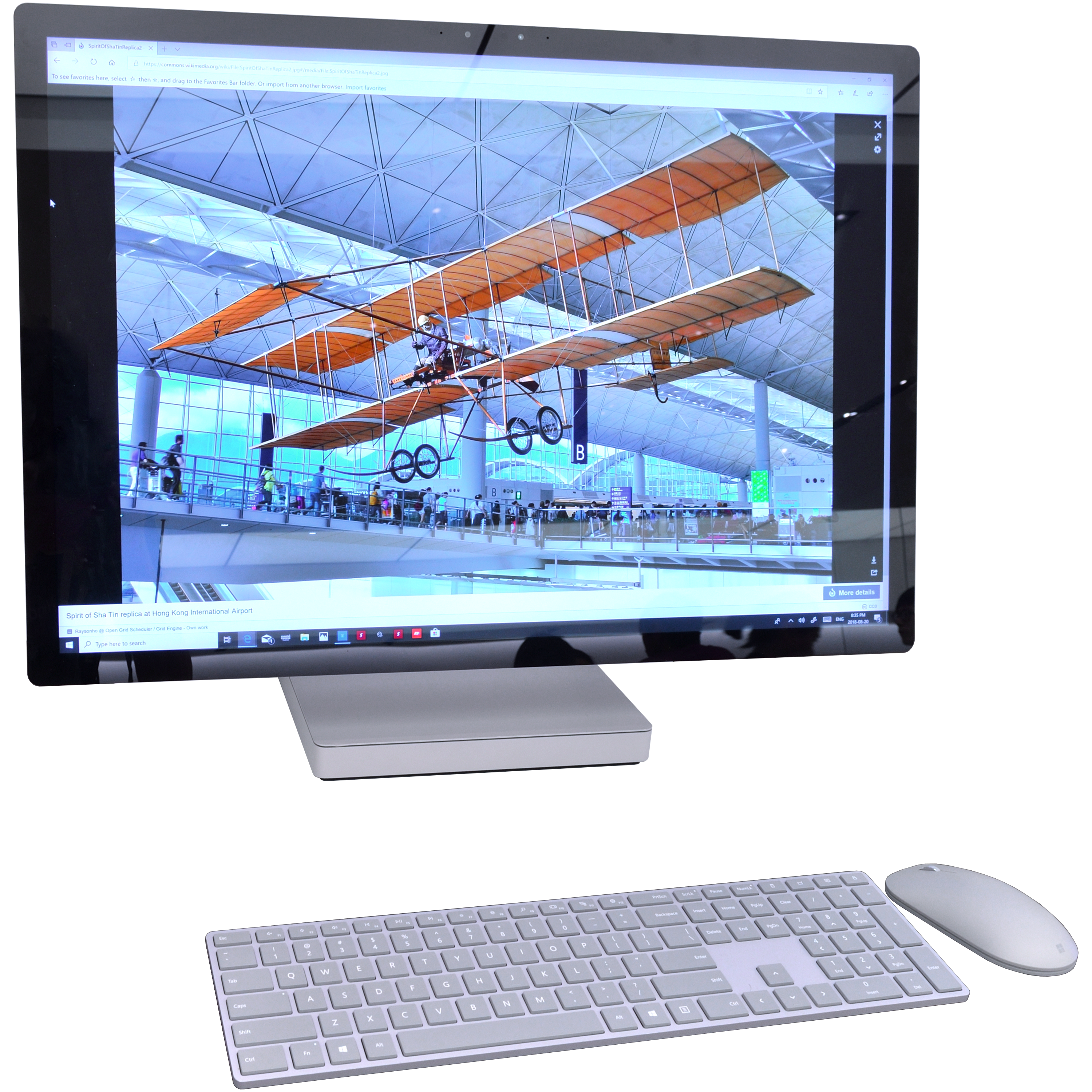
- Surface Studio in desktop mode with Surface Keyboard and Surface Mouse
- Developer: Microsoft
- Product family: Microsoft Surface
- Type: All-in-one PC
- Generation: 1st
- Released: December 15, 2016
- Introductory price: US$2,999-4,199
- Operating system: Windows 10 Pro
- CPU: Intel Skylake quad-core processor: i5-6440HQ; 2.6 up to 3.5 GHz, 6 MB cache, 45 W i7-6820HQ; 2.7 up to 3.6 GHz, 8 MB cache, 45 W Atmel ATSAMS70N21 32-bit ARM Cortex-M7 processor to power PixelSense display
- Memory: 8, 16 or 32 GB DDR4 RAM
- Storage: Rapid hybrid drive options: 1 TB or 2 TB
- Removable storage: Full-size SD card slot (supports SDXC cards)
- Display: 28 inches (71 cm) 4500x3000 (192 ppi) PixelSense display with 3:2 aspect ratio with 10-point multi-touch and pen support
- Graphics: Nvidia GeForce GTX 965M with 2 GB of GDDR5 memory Nvidia GeForce GTX 980M with 4 GB of GDDR5 memory (only available on Intel Core i7 with 32 GB RAM model)
- Sound: Stereo speakers, dual microphones, headset jack
- Input: Keyboard, touchpad mouse, Surface Pen, Surface Dial, sensors: accelerometer, gyroscope, magnetometer, ambient light
- Connectivity: 802.11a/b/g/n/ac Wi-Fi, Bluetooth 4.0, four USB 3.0 ports, Mini DisplayPort, Gigabit Ethernet
- Successor: Surface Studio 2
- Website: Surface.com

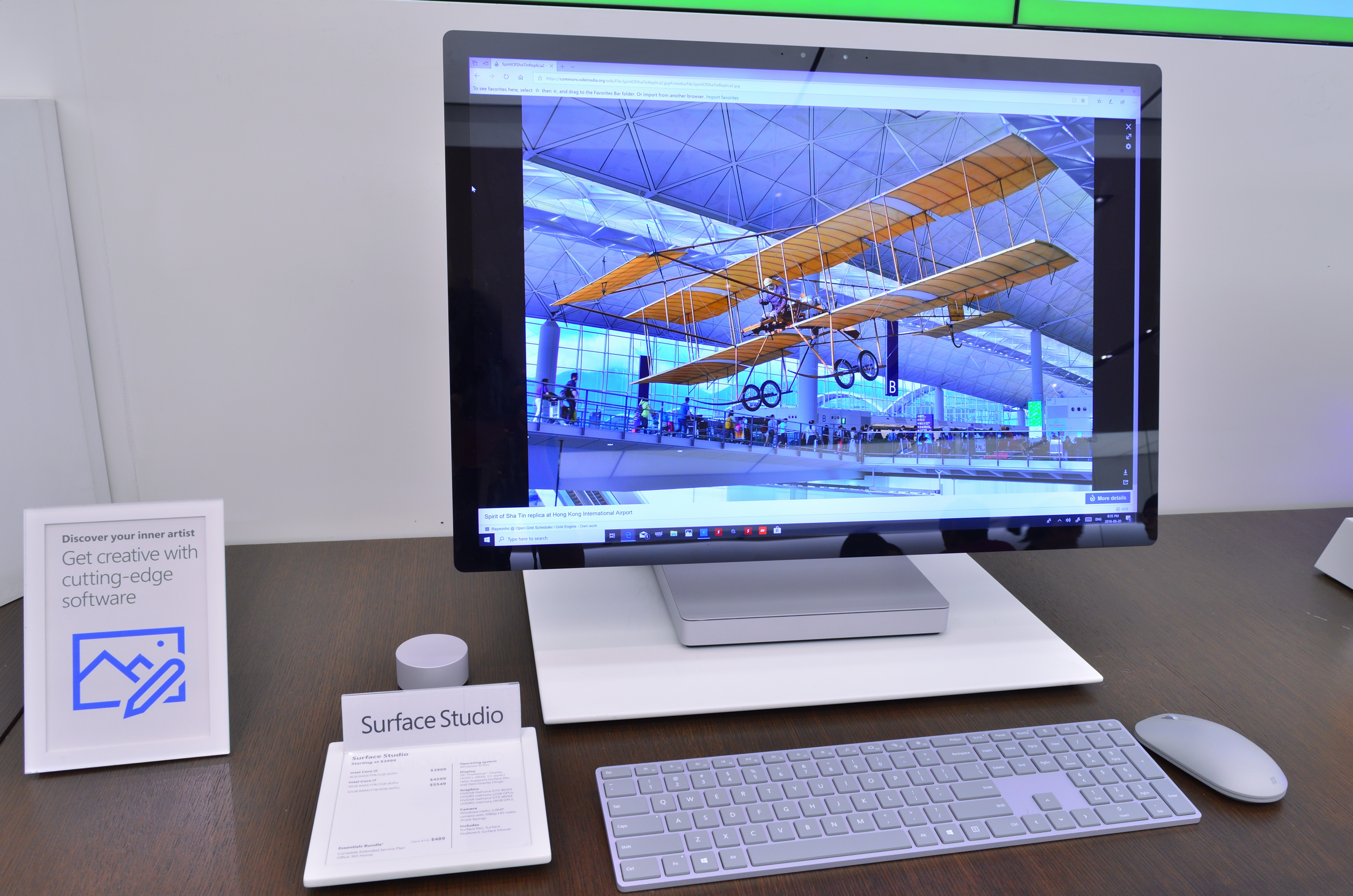
Surface Studio at Microsoft Store

The Surface Studio is an all-in-one PC, designed and produced by Microsoft as part of its Surface series of Windows-based personal computing devices. It was announced at the Windows 10 Devices Event on October 26, 2016, with pre-orders beginning that day.

The first desktop computer to be manufactured entirely by Microsoft, the Surface Studio, uses the Windows 10 operating system with the Anniversary Update preinstalled. However, it is optimized for the Windows 10 Creator's Update, which was released on April 11, 2017. The product, starting at $2,999, is aimed primarily at people in creative professions such as graphic artists and designers.

Two years later, in October 2018, Microsoft announced its successor, the Surface Studio 2.

== Features ==
=== Hardware ===
The Surface Studio has a 28-inch 4.5K "PixelSense" display with 4500 × 3000 pixels, equivalent to 192 dpi. The screen, at release the thinnest ever built for an all-in-one PC at 12.5 millimetres thick, is capable of being used in both the DCI-P3 and sRGB color spaces, and features a unique hinge design that allows it to be tilted to a flat position, in a manner similar to the Wacom Cintiq. The bezel of the display contains a 5.0 megapixel camera and a Windows Hello-compatible backlit infrared camera.

The CPU is located in the base. Its compact design contains a 6th generation (codename "Skylake") Intel Core i5 or Core i7 processor and either a NVIDIA GeForce GTX 965M or GeForce GTX 980M graphics processor (both dependent on configuration). The system can be configured with up to 32 GB of DDR4 RAM and a 2 terabyte hard drive. It also features four USB 3.0 ports, a Mini DisplayPort, an SDXC card reader and a headset connection.

Unlike many desktop PCs, the Surface Studio supports Microsoft's Modern Standby (formerly known as InstantGo) specification, enabling background tasks to operate while the computer is sleeping. A firmware update was released in April 2017 that enabled Cortana to be summoned via a "Hey, Cortana" voice command from sleep, provided the Studio is running the Creators Update.

Surface Studio Configuration Options
Price Tier (USD)	CPU	Integrated GPU	RAM	Internal Storage	Audio	Operating System
2,999	Intel Core i5-6440HQ (2.6 to 3.5 GHz)	GTX 965M	8 GB	1 TB SATA II HDD + 64 GB SATA SSD	Stereo speakers, dual microphones	Windows 10 Pro
3,499	Intel Core i7-6820HQ (2.7 to 3.6 GHz)	GTX 965M	16 GB	1 TB SATA II HDD + 128 GB NVMe SSD	Stereo speakers, dual microphones	Windows 10 Pro
4,199	Intel Core i7-6820HQ (2.7 to 3.6 GHz)	GTX 980M	32 GB	2 TB SATA III HDD + 128 GB NVMe SSD	Stereo speakers, dual microphones	Windows 10 Pro

=== Accessories ===
Microsoft specially designed its Surface Mouse and Surface Keyboard to work with the Surface Studio. It is also compatible with the Surface Pen and a newly created accessory, the Surface Dial. The latter consists of a round disk that can be placed on the display and rotated to perform various actions, such as scrolling, zooming, adjusting the volume, among others, with precision. Developers can utilize its APIs to integrate its functionality into their own products.

== Reception ==
The Surface Studio received generally positive reviews from technology critics. Many praised the large, high resolution display, with Tom Warren of The Verge calling it “truly one of the best desktop monitors I’ve ever used”. There was also praise for the design and build quality. Criticisms included the high entry price of the device, the all rear-facing I/O ports and the use of last generation Intel CPUs and Nvidia GPUs.

== Timeline ==
Timeline of Surface devices
Sources: Microsoft Devices Blog Microsoft Surface Store Microsoft Surface for Business store
