= Quart (disambiguation) =

Quart is an imperial and US customary unit of volume.

Quart may also refer to:

- Quart Festival, a music festival in Norway
- Quart (typographic unit), a proposed metric typographic unit

== Places ==
- Quart, Aosta Valley, a comune in Italy
- Quart, Girona, a municipality in Spain
- Quart de les Valls, a municipality in Spain
- Quart de Poblet, a municipality in Spain

== People ==
- Alberto Arnal (1913–1966), also known as Quart, Valencian pilotari (handball player)
- Emerico di Quart (died 1313), beatified Catholic bishop
- Josie Alice Quart (1895–1980), member of the Canadian Senate

== See also ==
- Quartz
