= Surface Laptop 6 =

Laptop computer developed by Microsoft

- Developer: Microsoft
- Product family: Microsoft Surface
- Type: Laptop
- Generation: Sixth
- Predecessor: Surface Laptop 5
- Successor: Surface Laptop 7th Edition
- Related: Surface Laptop Studio
- Website: microsoft.com

The Surface Laptop 6, launched together with the Surface Pro 10, is a laptop device developed by Microsoft for its business customers.

The Surface Laptop 6 was announced on March 22, 2024 alongside the Surface Pro 10, and both devices shipped and were available for purchase by business and commercial customers on April 9, 2024. Retail versions of the device became available later in 2024.

== Timeline ==
Timeline of Surface devices
Sources: Microsoft Devices Blog Microsoft Surface Store Microsoft Surface for Business store
