= Surface Pro 9 =

Ninth generation of Microsoft Surface Pro

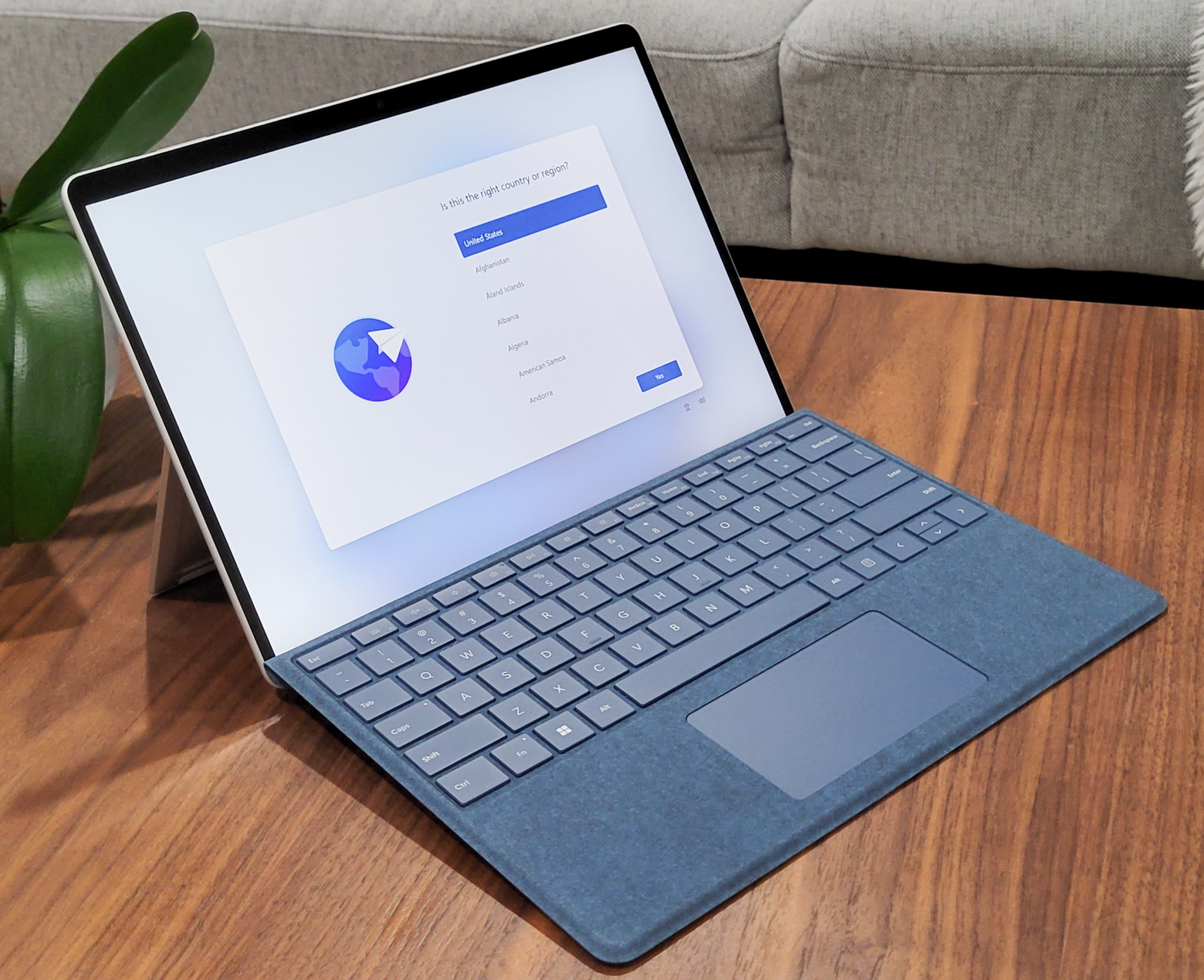
- Microsoft Surface Pro 9, Platinum tablet, sapphire keyboard
- Developer: Microsoft
- Product family: Microsoft Surface
- Type: 2-in-1 detachable
- Generation: Nine
- Released: 12 October 2022; 4 years ago
- Availability: 25 October 2022; 3 years ago
- Introductory price: USD 1100 to 2700
- Operating system: Windows 11 Home or Pro
- CPU: Intel Core i7-1255U/1265U; Intel Core i5-1235U/1245U; Microsoft SQ3
- Memory: 8GB, 16GB, or 32GB; LPDDR5 RAM (LPDDR4X for SQ3 model)
- Storage: 128GB, 256GB, 512GB, or 1TB SSD
- Display: 13 inch touchscreen 120 Hz refresh rate PixelSense Display; 2880 x 1920, 267 PPI; 3:2 Aspect Ratio
- Graphics: Iris Xe
- Sound: 2W stereo speakers with Dolby Atmos
- Input: Built-in: touchscreen, ambient light sensor, accelerometer, gyroscope, magnetometer, dual far-field studio mics Sold Separately: type cover, mouse, stylus pen, Surface Dial
- Camera: Front: 5 MP, 1080p HD; Rear: 10 MP, 4K
- Touchpad: On the Surface Type Cover (sold separately)
- Connectivity: WiFi 6, Bluetooth 5.1, 2 USB-C with Thunderbolt (interface), LTE
- Online services: Microsoft Store, OneDrive
- Dimensions: 287 mm x 208 mm x 9.3 mm (11.3 in x 8.2 in x 0.37 in)
- Weight: 879 grams (1.938 lb) – 883 grams (1.947 lb)
- Predecessor: Surface Pro 8 Surface Pro X
- Successor: Surface Pro 10
- Related: Surface
- Website: www.surface.com

The Microsoft Surface Pro 9 is a 2-in-1 detachable tablet computer developed by Microsoft to supersede the Surface Pro 8 and Surface Pro X, merging both brands. The device was announced on October 12, 2022 introducing two new colors and alongside the Surface Laptop 5 and Surface Studio 2+. The tablet is powered by the new Windows 11 operating system, and features 12th generation Intel Core processors or the ARM-based Microsoft SQ3 processor on 5G models.

== Configurations ==
Surface Pro 9 Configuration Options
Price tier in USD		CPU	GPU	RAM	Internal storage	5G	Color			
Consumer	Business	CPU	GPU	RAM	Internal storage	5G	Color			
$1,300	$1,400	Microsoft SQ3 (Qualcomm Snapdragon 8cx Gen3)	Adreno 8cx Gen3	8 GB	128 GB	Yes	P			
$1,400	$1,500	Microsoft SQ3 (Qualcomm Snapdragon 8cx Gen3)	Adreno 8cx Gen3	8 GB	256 GB	Yes	P			
$1,600	$1,700	Microsoft SQ3 (Qualcomm Snapdragon 8cx Gen3)	Adreno 8cx Gen3	16 GB	256 GB	Yes	P			
$1,900	$2,000	Microsoft SQ3 (Qualcomm Snapdragon 8cx Gen3)	Adreno 8cx Gen3	16 GB	512 GB	Yes	P			
$1,000	$1,100	Intel Core i5 1235U (Note: for consumers) or 1245U (Note: for business)	Intel Xe (80 EU @ 1.20 GHz)	8 GB	128 GB	No	P			
$1,100	$1,200	Intel Core i5 1235U or 1245U	Intel Xe (80 EU @ 1.20 GHz)	8 GB	256 GB	No	P	G	S	F
	$1,500	Intel Core i5 1235U or 1245U	Intel Xe (80 EU @ 1.20 GHz)	8 GB	512 GB	No	P	G		
$1,400	$1,500	Intel Core i5 1235U or 1245U	Intel Xe (80 EU @ 1.20 GHz)	16 GB	256 GB	No	P	G	S	F
$1,600	$1,700	Intel Core i7 1255U or 1265U	Intel Xe (96EU @ 1.25 GHz)	16 GB	256 GB	No	P	G	S	F
$1,800	$1,900	Intel Core i7 1255U or 1265U	Intel Xe (96EU @ 1.25 GHz)	16 GB	512 GB	No	P	G	S	F
$2,200	$2,300	Intel Core i7 1255U or 1265U	Intel Xe (96EU @ 1.25 GHz)	16 GB	1 TB	No	P			
$2,600	$2,700	Intel Core i7 1255U or 1265U	Intel Xe (96EU @ 1.25 GHz)	32 GB	1 TB	No	P			

Platinum Graphite Sapphire Forest

== Hardware ==
- The Surface Pro 9 is the 11th addition to the Surface Pro line and merges the Surface Pro and Surface Pro X brands.
- Powered by Evo 12th Generation Intel Core or Qualcomm Snapdragon processors.
- 5G connectivity with nano SIM card slot for Qualcomm Snapdragon models.
- Up to 15.5 hours of battery life with an Intel Processor and up to 19 hours with a Qualcomm processor.
- 13-inch touchscreen at 267 PPI, 3:2 aspect ratio, and 120 Hz refresh rate
- 2 USB-C ports with Thunderbolt 4 (Note: Thunderbolt 4 support is only available on the Intel models.)
- Up to 1 TB of SSD storage.
- Up to 32 GB of memory
- 4K video camera support.

== Timeline ==
Timeline of Surface devices
Sources: Microsoft Devices Blog Microsoft Surface Store Microsoft Surface for Business store

== Notes ==
Preceded by Surface Pro 8	Surface Pro; 9th generation	Succeeded by TBA
