= Quartic =

In mathematics, the term quartic describes something that pertains to the "fourth order", such as the function $x^4$. It may refer to one of the following:

- Quartic function, a polynomial function of degree 4
- Quartic equation, a polynomial equation of degree 4
- Quartic curve, an algebraic curve of degree 4
- Quartic reciprocity, a theorem from number theory
- Quartic surface, a surface defined by an equation of degree 4

== See also ==
- Quart (disambiguation)
- Quintic, relating to degree 5, as next higher above quartic
- Cubic (disambiguation), relating to degree 3 or a cube, as next lower below quartic
