= Surface Studio 2 =

All-in-one PC by Microsoft

- Developer: Microsoft
- Product family: Microsoft Surface
- Type: All-in-one PC
- Generation: 2nd
- Released: Surface Studio 2; 2 October 2018; 7 years ago Surface Studio 2+ 12 October 2022; 3 years ago
- Introductory price: USD3,500 - 4,800
- Discontinued: 6 December 2024; 21 months ago
- Operating system: Windows 10 Pro (officially upgradable to Windows 11)
- CPU: Surface Studio 2 Intel Kaby Lake quad-core processor: i7-7820HQ; 2.9 up to 3.9 GHz, 8 MB cache, 45 W Surface Studio 2+ Intel Willow Cove quad-core processor: i7-11370H; 3.3 up to 4.8 GHz, 12 MB cache, 35 W
- Memory: 16 or 32 GB DDR4 RAM
- Storage: SSD options: 1 TB or 2 TB
- Removable storage: Surface Studio 2 Full-size SD card slot (supports SDXC cards) Surface Studio 2+ None (card reader removed from 2+)
- Display: 28 inches (71 cm) 4500x3000 (192 ppi) PixelSense display with 3:2 aspect ratio with 10-point multi-touch and pen support
- Graphics: Surface Studio 2 Nvidia GeForce GTX 1060 with 6 GB of GDDR5 memory Nvidia GeForce GTX 1070 with 8 GB of GDDR5 memory Surface Studio 2+ Nvidia GeForce RTX 3060(Laptop) with 6 GB of GDDR6 memory
- Sound: Stereo speakers, dual microphones, headset jack
- Input: Keyboard, touchpad mouse, Surface Pen, Surface Dial, sensors: accelerometer, gyroscope, magnetometer, ambient light
- Connectivity: Surface Studio 2; 802.11ac Wi-Fi, Bluetooth 4.1, four USB 3.0 ports, one USB-C, Gigabit Ethernet; Surface Studio 2+ 802.11ax Wi-Fi, Bluetooth 5.1, two USB 3.1 ports, three Thunderbolt 4/USB4, Gigabit Ethernet
- Predecessor: Surface Studio
- Website: Official Site

The Surface Studio 2 is an all-in-one PC, designed and produced by Microsoft as part of its Surface series of Windows-based personal computing devices. It was announced at the Windows 10 Devices Event on October 2, 2018, two years after the release of the previous version Surface Studio, with pre-orders beginning that day.

The second desktop computer to be manufactured entirely by Microsoft, the Surface Studio uses the Windows 10 operating system with the October 2018 update preinstalled, with free upgrade to Windows 11. The product, starting at $3,499, is aimed primarily at people in creative professions such as graphic artists and designers.

The Surface Studio 2+ was announced on October 12, 2022 and discontinued in December 2024. The Surface Studio 2+ features an updated Intel 11th-gen CPU, NVIDIA GeForce RTX 3060 GPU, and three USB4/Thunderbolt 4 ports supporting up to three distinct 4K@60Hz displays.

== Features ==
=== Hardware ===
The Surface Studio 2 has a 28-inch 4.5K "PixelSense" display with 4500 x 3000 pixels, equivalent to 192 dpi. The screen, the thinnest ever built for an all-in-one PC at 12.5 millimetres thick, is capable of being used in both the DCI-P3 and sRGB color spaces, and features a unique hinge design that allows it be tilted to a flat position, in a manner similar to the Wacom Cintiq. The bezel of the display contains a 5.0 megapixel camera and a Windows Hello-compatible backlit infrared camera.

The CPU is located in the base. Its compact design contains a 7th generation (codename "Kaby Lake") Core i7 processor and either a NVIDIA GeForce GTX 1060 or GeForce GTX 1070 graphics processor (both dependent on configuration). The system can be configured with up to 32 GB of DDR4 RAM and a 2 terabyte SSD. It also features four USB 3.0 ports, a USB-C port, an SDXC card reader and a headset connection.

The updated Surface Studio 2+ has new CPU/GPU options, 2x USB 3.2 ports, 3x Thunderbolt 4/USB4 ports, a headphone connection, and Gigabit Ethernet but foregoes the SDXC card reader.

Unlike many desktop PCs, the Surface Studio 2 supports Microsoft's Modern Standby (formerly known as InstantGo) specification, enabling background tasks to operate while the computer is sleeping.

Surface Studio 2 configuration options
Price tier (USD)	Version	CPU	Integrated GPU	RAM	Internal storage
4500	Studio 2+	Intel Core i7-11370H	GeForce RTX 3060 6GB	32 GB	1 TB SSD
3500	Studio 2	Intel Core i7-7820HQ (2.9 to 3.9 GHz)	GeForce GTX 1060 6GB	16 GB	1 TB SSD
4200	Studio 2	Intel Core i7-7820HQ (2.9 to 3.9 GHz)	GeForce GTX 1070 8GB	32 GB	1 TB SSD
4800	Studio 2	Intel Core i7-7820HQ (2.9 to 3.9 GHz)	GeForce GTX 1070 8GB	32 GB	2 TB SSD

=== Accessories ===
Microsoft specially designed its Surface Mouse and Surface Keyboard to work with the Surface Studio 2. It is also compatible with the Surface Pen and a newly created accessory, the Surface Dial. The latter consists of a round disk that can be placed on the display and rotated to perform various actions, such as scrolling, zooming, adjusting the volume, among others, with precision. Developers can utilize its APIs to integrate its functionality into their own products.

== Reception ==
The Surface Studio 2 received generally positive reviews from technology critics. Many praised the large high resolution display, build quality and high performance of the GPU. Criticisms included the high entry price of the device, the all rear-facing I/O ports and the use of the previous-generation mobile Intel quad-core (as opposed to the contemporary six-core) CPU.

== Timeline ==
Timeline of Surface devices
Sources: Microsoft Devices Blog Microsoft Surface Store Microsoft Surface for Business store
