= Himetric =

Unit of measurement

Himetric is a resolution-independent unit of length. Its role is similar to the twip, but it is one hundredth of a millimetre. It is mainly used in Object Linking and Embedding and derived technologies such as ActiveX, Active Template Library and Visual Basic up to version 6.
