= Color bleeding (printing) =

Straight pen-drawn line color bleeding, causing jagged edges. Use of the term in prior art involved unwanted propagation of single color due to capillary action in paper fibers and other factors.

In printing and graphic arts, mixing of two dissimilar colors in two adjacent printed dots before they dry and absorb in substrate is referred to as color bleeding. Unless it is done for effect, color bleeding reduces print quality.

Prior art applied this term to the phenomenon of single color ink following the fibers of the paper.

The amount of bleeding is affected by numerous factors, including the paper type, paper's characteristics of ink absorption and its capillary action, ink type and properties (speed of ink drying), printing technology (i.e. nozzle design and spacing with ink jet printers).

Color bleeding in newspaper print. Note jagged edges of digit's contour lines, part being a result of surface roughness.

== See also ==
- Dot gain
