= Twip =

Typographical measurement

twip
- Unit system: Typographic units
- Unit of: Length

Conversions
1 twip in ...	... is equal to ...
- Typographic units: 1/20 points
- Imperial/US units: 1/1440 in
- Metric (SI) units: 17.64 μm

A twip (abbreviating "twentieth of a point" or "twentieth of an inch point") is a typographical measurement, defined as 1/20 of a typographical point. One twip is 1/1440 inch, or 17.64 μm.

== In computing ==
Twips are screen-independent units to ensure that the proportion of screen elements are the same on all display systems. A twip is defined as being 1/1440 of an inch (approximately 17.64 μm).

A pixel is a screen-independent unit, standing for 'picture element'. A pixel is a dot that represents the smallest graphical measurement on a screen. Twips are the default unit of measurement in Visual Basic (version 6 and earlier, prior to VB.NET). Converting between twips and screen pixels is achieved using the TwipsPerPixelX and TwipsPerPixelY properties or the ScaleX and ScaleY methods.

Twips can be used with Symbian OS bitmap images for automatic scaling from bitmap pixels to device pixels. They are also used in Rich Text Format from Microsoft for platform-independent exchange and they are the base length unit in OpenOffice.org and its fork LibreOffice.

Flash internally specifies most sizes in units it calls twips, but which are really 1/20 of a logical pixel, which is 3/4 of an actual twip.

== See also ==
- Himetric
- Thousandth of an inch – a 1/1000 of an inch, commonly called a thou /ˈθaʊ/ (used for both singular and plural) or, particularly in North America, a mil (plural mils).
