= Pixel density =

Screen resolution measured in pixels per length

Pixels per inch (ppi) and pixels per centimetre (ppcm or pixels/cm) are measurements of the pixel density of an electronic image device, such as a computer monitor or a television set's display, or image digitizing device such as a camera or image scanner. Horizontal and vertical density are usually the same, as most devices have square pixels, but differ on devices that have non-square pixels. Pixel density is not the same as resolution — where the former describes the amount of detail on a physical surface or device, the latter describes the amount of pixel information regardless of its scale. Considered in another way, a pixel has no inherent size or unit (a pixel is actually a sample), but when it is printed, displayed, or scanned, then the pixel has both a physical size (dimension) and a pixel density (ppi).

== Basic principles ==
Since most digital hardware devices use dots or pixels, the size of the media (in inches) and the number of pixels (or dots) are directly related by the pixels per inch. The following formula gives the number of pixels, horizontally or vertically, given the physical size of a format and the pixels per inch of the output:

$$\text{Number of Pixels} = \text{Size in Inches} * \text{PPI}$$

Pixels per inch (or pixels per centimetre) describes the detail of an image file when the print size is known. For example, a 100 × 100 pixel image printed in a 2-inch square has a resolution of 50 pixels per inch. Used this way, the measurement is meaningful when printing an image. In many applications, such as Adobe Photoshop, the program is designed so that one creates new images by specifying the graphic output device and PPI (pixels per inch). Thus the output target is often defined upon creating the image.

== Outputting to a different device ==
When moving images between devices, such as printing an image that was created on a monitor, it is important to understand the pixel density of both devices. Consider a 23″ HD monitor (20″ wide), that has a known, native resolution of 1920 pixels (horizontal). Let us assume an artist created a new image at this monitor resolution of 1920 pixels, possibly intended for the web without regard to printing. Rewriting the formula above can tell us the pixel density (PPI) of the image on the monitor display:

$$\text{PPI (monitor)} = \frac{\text{Number of Pixels}}{\text{Size in Inches}} = \frac{1920}{20} = 96\text{ ppi}$$

Now, let us imagine the artist wishes to print a larger banner 48 inches horizontally. We know the number of pixels in the image and the size of the output, from which we can use the same formula again to give the PPI of the printed poster:

$$\text{PPI (poster)} = \frac{\text{Number of Pixels}}{\text{Size in Inches}} = \frac{1920}{48} = 40\text{ ppi}$$

This shows that the output banner will have only 40 pixels per inch. Since a printer device is capable of printing at 300 ppi, the resolution of the original image is well below what would be needed to create a decent quality banner, even if it looked good on a monitor for a website. We would say more directly that a 1920 × 1080 pixel image does not have enough pixels to be printed in a large format.

== Printing on paper ==
Printing on paper is accomplished with different technologies. Newspapers and magazines were traditionally printed using a halftone screen, which would print dots at a given frequency, the screen frequency, in lines per inch (LPI) by using a purely analog process in which a photographic print is converted into variable sized dots through interference patterns passing through a screen. Modern inkjet printers can print microscopic dots at any location, and don't require a screen grid, with the metric dots per inch (DPI). These are both different from pixel density or pixels per inch (PPI) because a pixel is a single sample of any color, whereas an inkjet print can only print a dot of a specific color either on or off. Thus, a printer translates the pixels into a series of dots using a process called dithering. The dot pitch, the smallest size of each dot, is also determined by the type of paper the image is printed on. An absorbent paper surface, uncoated recycled paper for instance, lets ink droplets spread — so has a larger dot pitch.

Often one wishes to know the image quality in pixels per inch (PPI) that would be suitable for a given output device. If the choice is too low, then the quality will be below what the device is capable of—loss of quality—and if the choice is too high then pixels will be stored unnecessarily—wasted disk space. The ideal pixel density (PPI) depends on the output format, output device, the intended use and artistic choice. For inkjet printers measured in DPI it is generally good practice to use half or less than the DPI to determine the PPI. For example, an image intended for a printer capable of 600 dpi could be created at 300 ppi. When using other technologies such as AM or FM screen printing, there are often published screening charts that indicate the ideal PPI for a printing method.

Using the DPI or LPI of a printer remains useful to determine PPI until one reaches larger formats, such as 36" or higher, as the factor of visual acuity then becomes more important to consider. If a print can be viewed close up, then one may choose the printer device limits. However, if a poster, banner or billboard will be viewed from far away then it is possible to use a much lower PPI.

The outside of the square shown above is 200 pixels by 200 pixels. To determine a monitor's ppi, set the OS DPI scaling setting at 100% and the browser's zoom at 100%, then measure the width and height, in inches, of the square as displayed on a given monitor. Dividing 200 by the measured width or height gives the monitor's horizontal or vertical ppi, respectively, at the current screen resolution.

== Computer displays ==
The PPI/PPCM of a computer display is related to the size of the display in inches/centimetres and the total number of pixels in the horizontal and vertical directions. This measurement is often referred to as dots per inch, though that measurement more accurately refers to the resolution of a computer printer.

For example, a 15 inches (380 mm) display whose dimensions work out to 12 inches (300 mm) wide by 9 inches (230 mm) high, capable of a maximum 1024 × 768 (or XGA) pixel resolution, can display around 85 PPI, or 33.46 PPCM, in both the horizontal and vertical directions. This figure is determined by dividing the width (or height) of the display area in pixels by the width (or height) of the display area in inches. It is possible for a display to have different horizontal and vertical PPI measurements (e.g., a typical 4:3 ratio CRT monitor showing a 1280 × 1024 mode computer display at maximum size, which is a 5:4 ratio, not quite the same as 4:3). The apparent PPI of a monitor depends upon the screen resolution (that is, the number of pixels) and the size of the screen in use; a monitor in 800 × 600 mode has a lower PPI than does the same monitor in a 1024 × 768 or 1280 × 960 mode.

The dot pitch of a computer display determines the absolute limit of possible pixel density. Typical circa-2000 cathode-ray tube or LCD computer displays range from 67 to 130 PPI, though desktop monitors have exceeded 200 PPI, and certain smartphone manufacturers' flagship mobile device models have been exceeding 500 PPI since 2014.

In January 2008, Kopin Corporation announced a 0.44 inches (11 mm) SVGA LCD with a pixel density of 2272 PPI (each pixel only 11.25 μm). In 2011 they followed this up with a 3760-DPI 0.21-inch diagonal VGA colour display. The manufacturer says they designed the LCD to be optically magnified, as in high-resolution eyewear devices.

Holography applications demand even greater pixel density, as higher pixel density produces a larger image size and wider viewing angle. Spatial light modulators can reduce pixel pitch to 2.5 μm, giving a pixel density of 10,160 PPI.

Some observations indicate that the unaided human generally can't differentiate detail beyond 300 PPI. However, this figure depends both on the distance between viewer and image, and the viewer's visual acuity. The human eye also responds in a different way to a bright, evenly lit interactive display from how it does to prints on paper.

High pixel density display technologies would make supersampled antialiasing obsolete, enable true WYSIWYG graphics and, potentially enable a practical "paperless office" era. For perspective, such a device at 15 inches (380 mm) screen size would have to display more than four Full HD screens (or WQUXGA resolution).

The PPI pixel density specification of a display is also useful for calibrating a monitor with a printer. Software can use the PPI measurement to display a document at "actual size" on the screen.

=== Calculation of monitor PPI ===
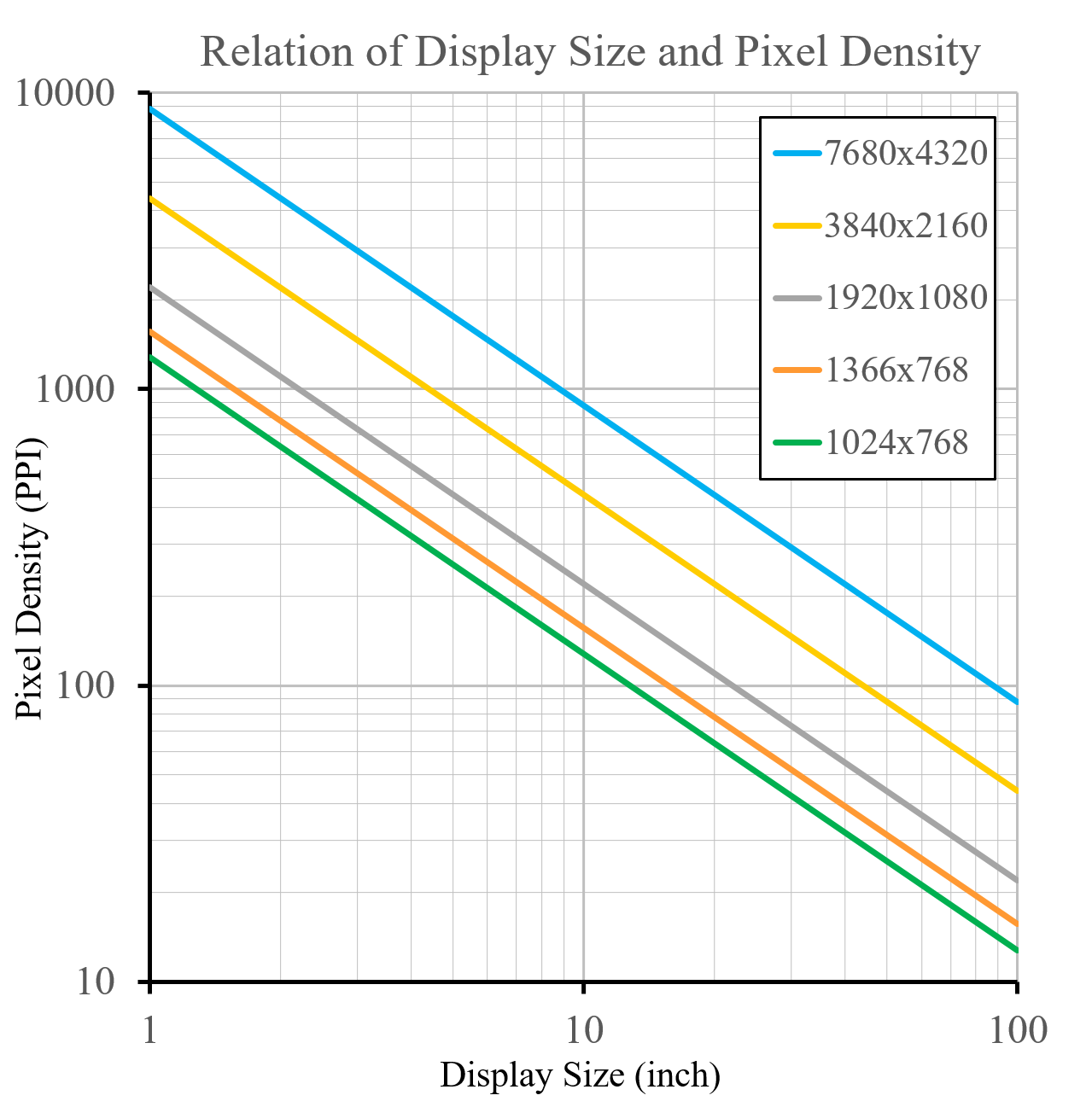

PPI can be calculated from the screen's diagonal size in inches and the resolution in pixels (width and height). This can be done in two steps:

1. Calculate diagonal resolution in pixels using the Pythagorean theorem:
  $d_p = \sqrt{w_p^2 + h_p^2}$
2. Calculate the PPI:
  $PPI = \frac{d_p}{d_i}$

where

1. $w_p$ is width resolution in pixels
2. $h_p$ is height resolution in pixels
3. $d_p$ is diagonal size in pixels.
4. $d_i$ is diagonal size in inches (this is the number advertised as the size of the display).

For example:

1. For 15.6 inches (400 mm) screen with a 5120 × 2880 resolution you get $\frac{\sqrt{5120^2 + 2880^2}}{15.6}$ = 376.57 PPI.
2. For 50 inches (1,300 mm) screen with an 8192 × 4608 resolution you get $\frac{\sqrt{8192^2 + 4608^2}}{50}$ = 188 PPI.
3. For 27 inches (690 mm) screen with a 3840 × 2160 resolution you get $\frac{\sqrt{3840^2 + 2160^2}}{27}$ = 163 PPI.
4. For 32 inches (810 mm) screen with a 3840 × 2160 resolution you get $\frac{\sqrt{3840^2 + 2160^2}}{32}$ = 138 PPI.
5. For an old-school 10.1 inches (260 mm) netbook screen with a 1024 × 600 resolution you get $\frac{\sqrt{1024^2 + 600^2}}{10.1}$ = 117.5 PPI.
6. For 27 inches (690 mm) with a 2560 × 1440 resolution you get $\frac{\sqrt{2560^2 + 1440^2}}{27}$ = 108.8 PPI.
7. For a 21.5 inches (550 mm) screen with a 1920 × 1080 resolution you get $\frac{\sqrt{1920^2 + 1080^2}}{21.5}$ = 102.46 PPI;

These calculations may not be very precise. Frequently, screens advertised as "X inch screen" can have their real physical dimensions of viewable area differ, for example:

- Apple Inc. advertised their mid-2011 iMac as a "21.5 inch (viewable) [...] display," but its actual viewable area is 545.22 mm or 21.465 inches. The more precise figure increases the calculated PPI from 102.46 (using 21.5) to 102.63.
- The HP LP2065 20 inches (510 mm) monitor has an actual viewable area of 20.1 inches (510 mm).
- In a more significant case, some monitors such as the Dell UltraSharp UP3216Q (3840 × 2160 px) are advertised as a 32 inches (810 mm) "class" monitor (137.68 PPI), but the actual viewing area diagonal is 31.5 inches (800 mm), making the true PPI 139.87.

=== Calculating PPI of camera view screens ===
Camera manufacturers often quote view screens in 'number of dots'. This is not the same as the number of pixels, because there are 3 'dots' per pixel – red, green and blue. For example, the Canon 50D is quoted as having 920,000 dots. This translates as 307,200 pixels (×3 = 921,600 dots). Thus the screen is 640 × 480 pixels.

This must be taken into account when working out the PPI. 'Dots' and 'pixels' are often confused in reviews and specs when viewing information about digital cameras specifically.

== Scanners and cameras ==
"PPI" or "pixel density" may also describe image scanner resolution. In this context, PPI is synonymous with samples per inch. In digital photography, pixel density is the number of pixels divided by the area of the sensor. A typical DSLR, circa 2013, has 1–6.2 MP/cm^{2}; a typical compact has 20–70 MP/cm^{2}.

For example, Sony Alpha SLT-A58 has 20.1 megapixels on an APS-C sensor having 6.2 MP/cm^{2} since a compact camera like Sony Cyber-shot DSC-HX50V has 20.4 megapixels on a 1/2.3" sensor having 70 MP/cm^{2}. The professional camera has a lower PPI than a compact camera, because it has larger photodiodes and far larger sensors.

== Smartphones ==
Smartphones use small displays, but modern smartphone displays have a larger PPI rating, such as the Samsung Galaxy S7 with a quad HD display at 577 PPI, Fujitsu F-02G with a quad HD display at 564 PPI, the LG G6 with quad HD display at 564 PPI or – XHDPI or Oppo Find 7 with 534 PPI on 5.5-inch (140 mm) display – XXHDPI (see section below). Sony's Xperia XZ Premium has a 4K display with a pixel density of 807 PPI, the highest of any smartphone as of 2017.

=== Logical DPI values on Android ===
Android supports the following logical DPI values for controlling how large content is displayed:

| Name | Full name | Scale factor | DPI |
|---|---|---|---|
| ldpi | Low DPI | 0.75x | ~120 |
| mdpi | Medium DPI | 1x | ~160 |
| tvdpi | TV DPI | 1.33x | ~213 |
| hdpi | High DPI | 1.5x | ~240 |
| xhdpi | Extreme high DPI | 2x | ~320 |
| xxhdpi | Extreme x2 high DPI | 3x | ~480 |
| xxxhdpi | Extreme x3 high DPI | 4x | ~640 |

== Metrication ==
The digital publishing industry primarily uses pixels per inch but sometimes pixels per centimeter is used, or a conversion factor is given.

The PNG image file format only allows the meter as the unit for pixel density.

== Image file format support ==
The following table show how pixel density is supported by popular image file formats. The cell colors used do not indicate how feature-rich a certain image file format is, but what density support can be expected of a certain image file format.

Even though image manipulation software can optionally set density for some image file formats, not many other software uses density information when displaying images. Web browsers, for example, ignore any density information. As the table shows, support for density information in image file formats varies enormously and should be used with great care in a controlled context.

| Format | Units of measurement (Note: Length refers to horizontal and vertical size in inches, centimeters, etc., whereas pixel refers only to the number of pixels found along the horizontal and vertical dimension.) | Raster/vector | Multi-page | Per-page size | Size in lengths for image or page | Density |
|---|---|---|---|---|---|---|
| Exif | Length | Raster | | | | PPI or PPCM, 8 bytes (64bit rational unsigned) each for horizontal and vertical directions |
| AI | Length or pixel | Both | No | | Explicit for length. No for pixel | Implicit for included raster images |
| EPS | Length | Both | Yes | Yes | Explicit | Explicit DPI (PPI) for rasterized images, fonts or effects |
| GIF | Pixel | Raster | Yes | No | No | No |
| ICO | Pixel | Raster | Yes | Yes | No | No |
| JPEG | Pixel | Raster | No | | Implicit when density is set | Optional PPI or PPCM, 2 bytes each for horizontal and vertical directions |
| PDF | Length | Both | Yes | Yes | Explicit | Explicit DPI (PPI) for rasterized images, fonts or effects |
| PNG | Pixel | Raster | No | | Implicit when density is set | Optional PPM, 4 bytes each horizontal and vertical directions |
| PPM | Pixel | Raster | Yes | No | No | No |
| PSD and PSB | Length or pixel | Both | No | | Explicit for length. No for pixel | Optional |
| SVG | Length or pixel | Both | Yes | No | Explicit for length. (Note: Support in SVG differs. The standard supports the floats pixelUnitToMillimeterX, pixelUnitToMillimeterY, screenPixelToMillimeterX and screenPixelToMillimeterY for use in CSS2. Inkscape SVG supports density for PNG export only inkscape:export-xdpi and inkscape:export-ydpi. Adobe stores it even differently.) No for pixel | Implicit for included raster images |
| TIFF | Pixel | Both | Yes | Yes | Implicit when density is set | Optional PPI or PPCM, two 32-bit unsigned integers each for horizontal and vertical directions |
| WebP | Pixel | Raster | Yes | Unknown | Unknown | WEBP has no tags/attributes of its own which specify density on the output medium. But WEBP uses Resource Interchange File Format as its container format, which supports Metadata to be included as XMP and EXIF chunks. And EXIF supports resolution; see entry in this table. Practical example: GraphicConverter v11.7.1 correctly shows resolution information for WEBP files with EXIF metadata. |
| XCF | Pixel | Both | No | | No | Optional PPI, 32-bit float each for horizontal and vertical directions |
| Format | Units of measurement | Raster/vector | Multi-page | Per-page size | Size in lengths for image or page | Density |

== See also ==
- Computer monitor DPI standards – the origins of 96 DPI/PPI as Microsoft/Windows standard and 72 DPI/PPI as (former) Apple/Macintosh standard
- Resolution independence
- Retina display
- 1:1 pixel mapping
- PenTile
