= S Pen =

Line of stylus pens designed by Samsung Electronics

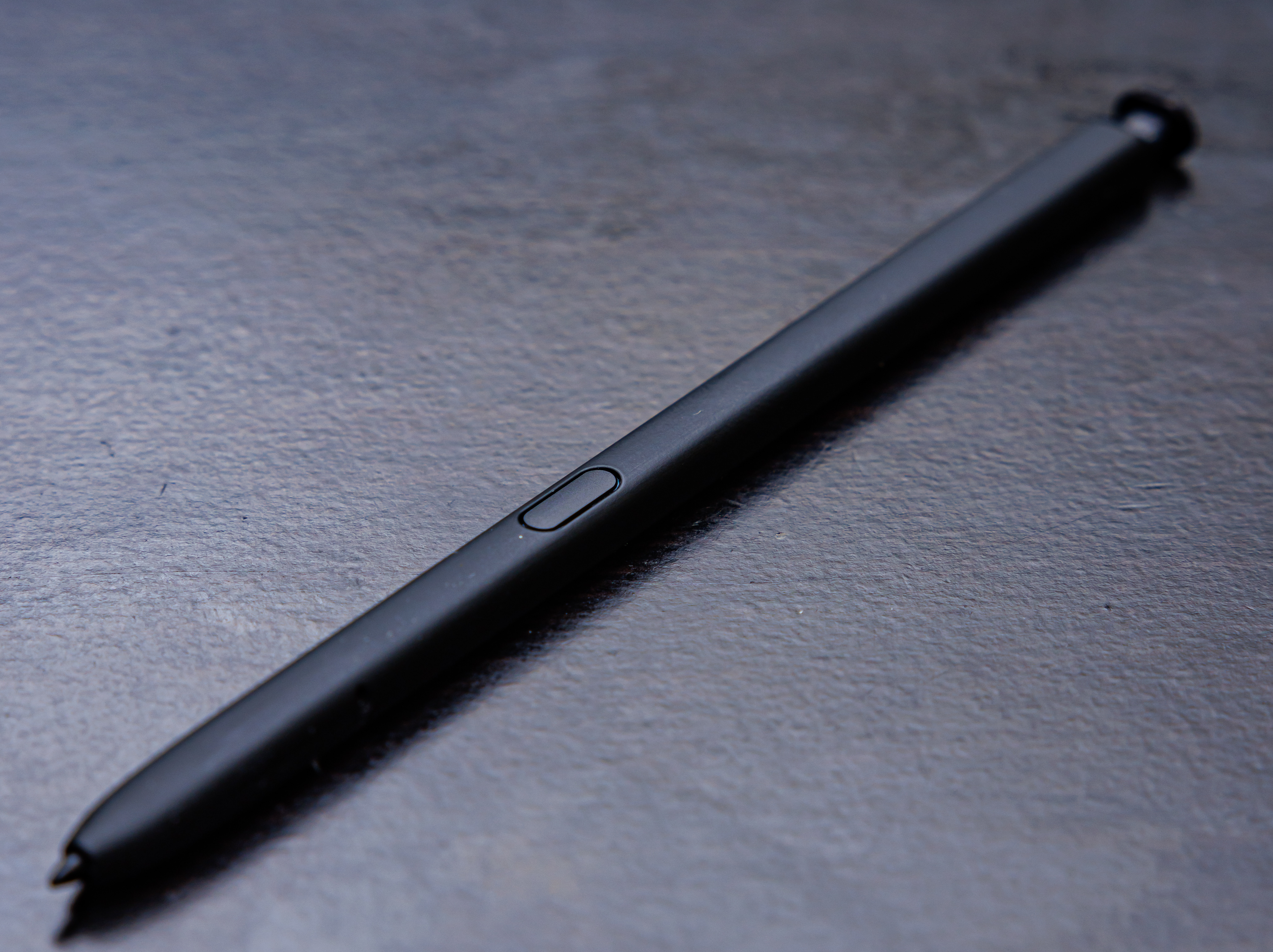
- A black S Pen that shipped with the Samsung Galaxy S22 Ultra (2022)
- Developer: Samsung Electronics
- Type: Digital stylus
- Released: 29 October 2011
- Introductory price: ₩55,000 (Fold Edition, 2021)-₩121,000 (Pro, 2021)
- Dimensions: S Pen Pro: 170.9 mm × 8.89 mm (6.728 in × 0.350 in); S Pen Fold Edition 132.1 mm × 7.7 mm (5.20 in × 0.30 in)
- Weight: S Pen Pro: 13.8 grams (0.49 oz); S Pen Fold Edition 6.3 grams (0.22 oz)

S Pen (Korean: S펜) is a wireless digital pen stylus designed and developed by Samsung Electronics featuring Wacom's digital pen technology. It is made for use (and often bundled) with supported Galaxy mobile devices like smartphones and tablets, as well as selected Samsung Notebook, Galaxy Book, and Chromebook notebooks. It was first released with the Galaxy Note in 2011, becoming a core feature of the Note line of products. The S Pen supports features such as translating text by hovering the pen, and creating animated messages.

== History and models ==
The S Pen was introduced with the Galaxy Note series, the first "phablet", in 2011. The stylus has an active digitizer by Wacom, with the first generation having 128 levels of pressure sensitivity. A button on the side of the pen can be used to activate special pen-oriented features and gestures in the system software.

The second generation S Pen on the Galaxy Note II is slightly thicker than in the original Galaxy Note, and a feature marketed as Air View allows a user to preview content by hovering the pen over the content, similar to the hoverbox feature of a mouse in some desktop computers, such as thumbnails in the gallery and a preview tooltip on the video player's time seek bar, and zooming in the web browser (Samsung Internet) and for scrolling.

On the Galaxy Note 7, the OS featured several new tools supporting the S Pen stylus, including translation, a screen magnifier, and a GIF recording tool. The previous suite of note-taking apps was also consolidated into a single Samsung Notes app.

The S Pen on the Galaxy Note 8 offers expanded software features, including "Live Message" for the creation of handwritten notes combined with emojis resulting in short animated GIFs. Users can remove the S Pen from the device and immediately write notes on the display through "Screen Off Memo," which works due to the screen's always-on capabilities.

Starting from the Galaxy Note 9 and ending with the Galaxy S24 Ultra, the S Pen has Bluetooth capabilities, including the ability to tap the button on the pen to do certain tasks.

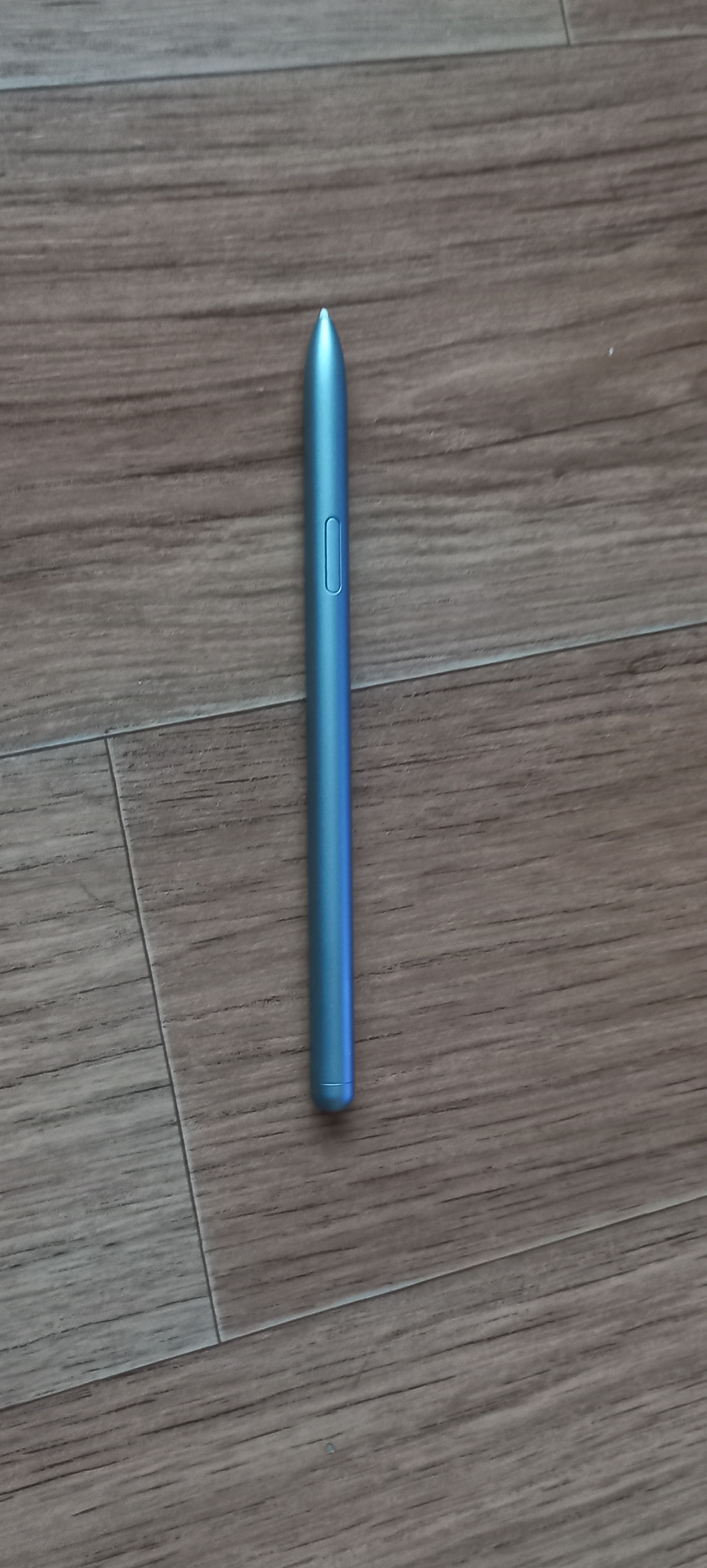
The S Pen bundled with Galaxy Tab S7 FE from 2021

On the Galaxy Note 10, the pen is one piece of plastic, instead of two like the Note 9, and supports more advanced Air Actions that allow users to control the phablet remotely with the pen. This includes changing the camera settings and exporting the handwritten text to Microsoft Word remotely.

The S Pen on the Galaxy Note 20 features a faster response time than previous models and an extended battery life.

The Galaxy S22 Ultra is the first S series phone to include a built-in S Pen, a hallmark feature of the Galaxy Note series. The S Pen has latency at 2.8ms, reduced from 26ms on the Note 20 and 9ms on the Note 20 Ultra and S21 Ultra.

The Galaxy S25 Ultra S Pen lacks Bluetooth.

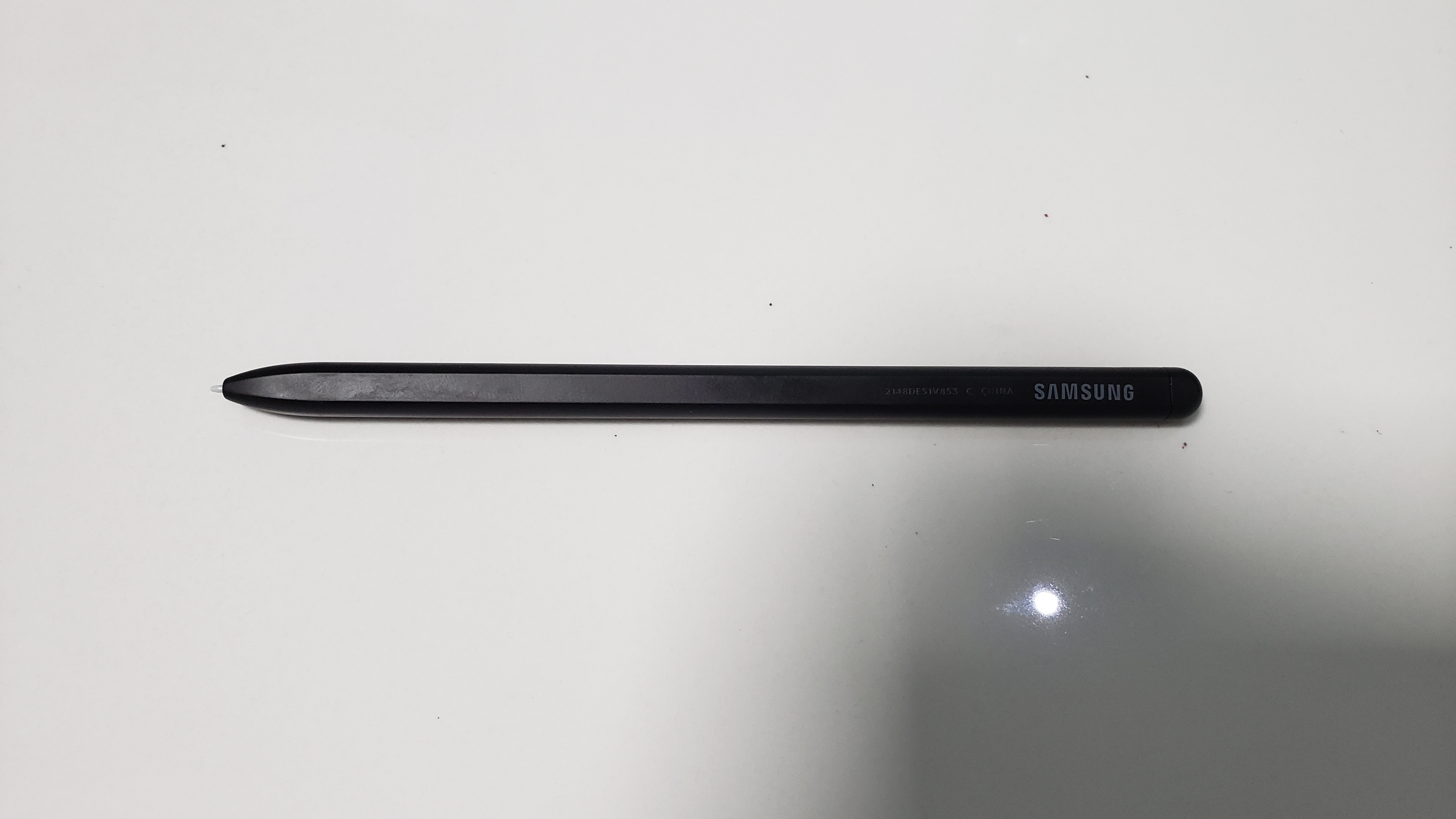
Included S Pen of the Samsung Galaxy Tab S8 Ultra

== Third-party pens ==
Compatible Galaxy devices for the S Pen make use of Wacom EMR technology, meaning that third-party pens made for the same technology will also work other than the S Pen. This includes the Hi-Uni Digital Mitsubishi Pencil, the Staedtler Noris Digital, the LAMY AL-star black, EMR, as well as the Wacom One Pen.

== Compatible devices ==
- Galaxy Note series
- Galaxy Tab series
  - Tab S: all models since S3 (except S5e)
  - Tab A: Tab A 8.0 (2015/2019), Tab A 9.7 and Tab A 10.1 (2016) only
  - Tab Active: all models
- Galaxy S series: all "Ultra" models since S21 Ultra (bundled since S22 Ultra)
- Galaxy Z Fold series: all unbundled models since Z Fold 3 (except Z Fold 7 and Z Fold SE)
- Galaxy Book: Book, Book2, Flex, Flex α, all "Pro 360" models
- Samsung Notebook: 9 Pen, 9 Pro (other pen-enabled models like 7 Spin use the Active Pen)
- Samsung Chromebook: Plus, Pro, Galaxy Chromebook (Galaxy Chromebook 2 uses USI)
- Samsung Ativ: Tab 3, Tab 5 and Tab 7

== Specifications comparison ==
Pen tip diameter	Bundled with		
Pen tip diameter	Galaxy phones	Galaxy tablets	Others
1.6 mm	Note 3/4/5, Note 10.1, Note Pro 12.2	Tab A 8.0, Tab A 9.7, Tab A 10.1 (2016)	
0.7 mm	Note 7/8/9 series	Tab S3, Tab S4, Tab A (2019), Tab Active2	Notebook 9 Pen S
0.7 mm (new)	Note 10/20 series, S21 Ultra, S22 Ultra, S23 Ultra, S24 Ultra	Tab S6, Tab S6 Lite, Tab S7 series, Tab S8 series, Tab S9 series, Tab Active 3	
1.5 mm	Z Fold 3/4/5/6, S25 Ultra, S26 Ultra		

== See also ==
- Samsung Galaxy Note series
- Pen computing
- Wacom
- Apple Pencil
- Surface Pen
- Microsoft Tablet PC
