= Microsoft pen protocol =

Active stylus protocol developed by Microsoft

Microsoft Pen Protocol
- Microsoft Pen Protocol
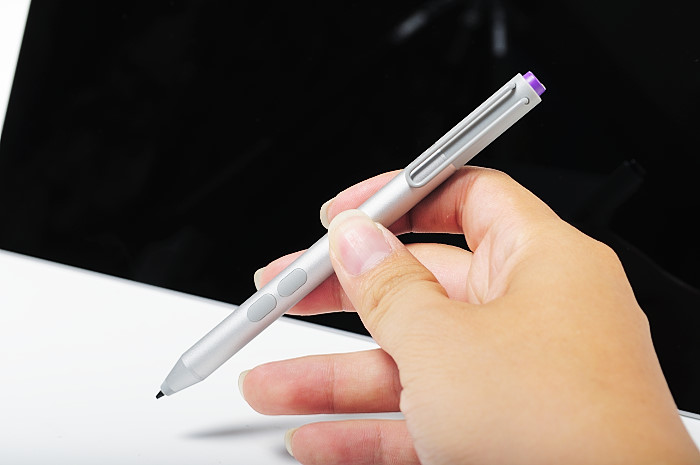
- A Surface Pen, the reference implementation of the Microsoft Pen Protocol
- Abbreviation: MPP
- Status: In use
- Latest version: MPP 2.6
- Organization: Microsoft
- Related standards: HID over USB, I²C and BTLE
- Domain: Active stylus input

The Microsoft Pen Protocol (MPP) is an active-pen communication protocol developed by Microsoft for digital pen input on Microsoft Surface and other Windows devices. The protocol covers how a powered stylus exchanges position, pressure, tilt, button and battery information with a paired digitizer using the Human Interface Device (HID) framework, and is used by the Surface Pen and Surface Slim Pen families as well as third-party pens and computers from manufacturers such as HP and Dell that license the technology.

MPP grew out of a partnership with the Israeli digitizer company N-trig, which supplied the active-pen technology used in the Surface Pro 3 and Surface 3 in 2014, replacing the Wacom-based EMR system used in earlier Surface devices. Microsoft acquired N-trig's pen-related technology and assets in May 2015 and has continued to develop the protocol, releasing updated versions roughly in step with new Surface Pen and Surface Slim Pen models. As of 2026, the most recent published version is MPP 2.6, used by the Surface Slim Pen 2.

== Background ==
=== Active stylus technologies ===
MPP is an active-stylus standard, meaning the pen contains its own power source and electronics rather than being a passive object excited by an electromagnetic field generated in the digitizer. Active pens compete with several other technologies in the personal-computer market, including Wacom's passive EMR pens, Wacom's active electrostatic pens (Wacom AES), the Universal Stylus Initiative (USI) standard largely used by Chromebooks, and proprietary protocols such as Apple's Apple Pencil and Samsung's S Pen. MPP is most closely comparable to Wacom AES in operating principles: both rely on a battery-powered pen that emits a signal capacitively coupled into a touch-sensitive display, and both work on flat, glass-bonded panels without a separate sensor layer behind the screen.

=== HID-based design ===
According to Microsoft's hardware design guidance, integrated Windows pen devices, including those that use MPP, are expected to communicate with the host using the HID protocol over USB, I²C or Bluetooth. Windows ships with HID class drivers and bus-specific miniport drivers for HID-USB, HID-I²C and HID-BTH, so for those buses no third-party host-side driver is required; the Windows 10 Hardware Lab Kit does not even allow third-party drivers for pen devices on those buses to be certified. A pen-device manufacturer therefore implements MPP largely in firmware, exposing the required HID descriptors, top-level collections and pen states defined in Microsoft's developer documentation.

== History ==
=== Origins at N-trig (1999 to 2014) ===
N-trig was founded in Israel in 1999 to develop active-pen and multi-touch digitizer technology for personal computers. The company's "DuoSense" digitizers were used in pen-and-touch laptops by Dell, HP, Sony, Fujitsu and Lenovo during the late 2000s and early 2010s, but its biggest commercial breakthrough came when Microsoft selected N-trig to provide both the digitizer and the active pen for the Surface Pro 3, announced on 20 May 2014. The decision marked a switch away from Wacom's EMR system, which had been used in the original Surface Pro and Surface Pro 2.

The Surface Pro 3 pen, supplied by N-trig, supported 256 levels of pressure and used a Bluetooth top button to launch OneNote. A Microsoft Devices Blog post about the new pen described in-house testing for accuracy and low latency, and noted that pressure-sensitivity drivers from N-trig were available for popular drawing applications.

=== Acquisition by Microsoft (2015) ===
On 1 May 2015 Microsoft confirmed that it had acquired the active-pen technology and related assets used in the Surface Pro 3 and Surface 3 from N-trig. The deal had originally been reported in February 2015 by Israeli newspaper Calcalist as a full company acquisition for around 200 million dollars, but Microsoft's confirmation specified that it was buying the pen technology and related assets rather than the company outright; Israeli outlet NoCamels subsequently reported a confirmed price of approximately 30 million dollars. Most of N-trig's roughly 190 employees joined Microsoft Israel as part of a new pen-focused research and development team.

=== Evolution of the protocol (2015 to 2021) ===
With the Surface Pro 4, announced on 6 October 2015, Microsoft introduced an updated Surface Pen with one side button, a tail-mounted eraser-button and 1,024 levels of pressure on Surface Pro 4 hardware, supported by a custom in-house "G5" co-processor that handled display and stylus interaction.

In May 2017 Microsoft announced a new generation of Surface Pen (model 1776) alongside the new Surface Pro, with 4,096 levels of pressure, support for tilt-based shading on compatible Surface devices, and reduced inking latency. Microsoft positioned the new pen as the second public protocol generation, MPP 2.0, and HP, Dell and other partners began advertising MPP 2.0 support in their devices and accessories.

The first Surface Slim Pen was introduced on 2 October 2019 alongside the Surface Pro X and the Surface Pro X Signature Keyboard, in which the pen was magnetically stored and wirelessly charged. Microsoft described the Slim Pen as a complement to the existing Surface Pen, designed for users who preferred a flat, "carpenter pencil" form factor.

The Surface Slim Pen 2, announced on 22 September 2021 alongside the Surface Pro 8 and the Surface Laptop Studio, added a haptic motor that produces "tactile signals" intended to mimic the feel of pen on paper, a sharper tip, and a "Zero-Force Inking" mode that the company said reduced perceived latency by detecting the pen earlier as it approached the screen. Haptic functionality requires a compatible Surface device running Windows 11 and an application that has opted in to the Slim Pen 2's haptic API.

== Versions ==
Microsoft's Surface Support pages identify MPP versions by the Surface pen model that uses them, rather than by publishing a numbered specification. The following table summarizes the versions documented in Microsoft's compatibility guidance and in vendor materials such as those from HP and Dell.

MPP version	Reference Microsoft pen	Year	Notable features
MPP 1.2	Surface Pen with two side buttons (model 1616)	2014	First MPP-era pen, originally branded as the Surface Pro 3 Pen; up to 256 levels of pressure on Surface Pro 3 and Surface 3.
MPP 1.5	Surface Pen with single button on flat edge (model 1710)	2015	Introduced with Surface Pro 4 and Surface Book; up to 1,024 levels of pressure on Surface Pro 4-class hardware.
MPP 1.51	No first-party Microsoft pen	c. 2017	Intermediate revision used by various OEM pens, including the HP MPP 1.51 stylus; up to 1,024 levels of pressure, no tilt support.
MPP 2.0	Surface Pen with no clip (model 1776)	2017	Introduced with the 2017 Surface Pro; up to 4,096 levels of pressure and tilt support on compatible devices, with significantly reduced latency relative to MPP 1.5.
MPP 2.5	Surface Slim Pen (1st generation), Surface Hub 2 Pen	2019	Used by the Slim Pen introduced with the Surface Pro X and by the Surface Hub 2 Pen; first MPP-class pen with internal rechargeable battery and wireless charging.
MPP 2.6	Surface Slim Pen 2	2021	Adds Zero-Force Inking and haptic feedback (tactile signals) on supported Surface devices running Windows 11.

== Compatibility ==
MPP support depends on both the pen and the digitizer integrated into the host display, and inking behaviour can vary by version match between the two. Microsoft's support pages advise users who wish to pair a Surface Pen with a non-Surface PC to consult the device manufacturer for the supported MPP version and to ensure that the Surface Pen and the host advertise the same version, as a higher-version pen on a lower-version digitizer falls back to the older feature set; for example, a 4,096-level Surface Pen will only deliver 1,024 levels on a Surface Pro 4-class digitizer.

Outside Microsoft's own Surface line, MPP is most prominent in convertible and 2-in-1 laptops from HP and Dell. HP advertises Microsoft Pen Protocol 2.0 support for accessories such as the HP Rechargeable MPP 2.0 Tilt Pen, listing 4,096 levels of pressure, tilt, and Windows Ink integration. Some Dell convertibles, including parts of the Inspiron and Latitude lines, use MPP for their pen input and ship with first-party Dell Active Pens implementing MPP 1.51 or 2.0. Third-party pen makers including Wacom, Lazarite, Renaisser and Metapen also produce MPP-compatible pens, and some, such as the Wacom Bamboo Ink, support both MPP and Wacom AES so that a single pen can work across both protocol families.

MPP pens are not interoperable with devices using only Wacom EMR (such as the original Surface Pro and Surface Pro 2, Samsung Galaxy Book series and many Wacom Cintiq tablets), Wacom AES-only laptops, or USI-only Chromebooks.

== Reception ==
Following the move from Wacom to N-trig for the Surface Pro 3, technology reviewers and artists were initially divided on the merits of the new pen, with some preferring Wacom's pen feel and lower jitter and others welcoming N-trig's lower-profile digitizer and reduced parallax thanks to its bonded glass design. Successive MPP revisions have been seen as steadily closing the gap with Wacom for general note-taking and illustration use, with reviewers describing the Slim Pen 2 and recent Surface Pen as competitive with the Apple Pencil for many tasks while still trailing high-end Wacom EMR tablets at the top end of professional digital art. Industry commentators have, however, noted that fragmentation between MPP, Wacom AES, Wacom EMR and USI continues to make stylus selection confusing for end users, and that the version-by-pen labelling used by Microsoft (rather than a public, numbered specification) makes it harder for buyers to verify cross-vendor compatibility.

== See also ==
- Active pen
- Pen computing
- Surface Pen
- Surface Slim Pen
- Universal Stylus Initiative
- Wacom
- Windows Ink
