= HTC Flyer =

Tablet computer

HTC Flyer HTC EVO View
- Manufacturer: HTC Corporation
- Type: Tablet, media player
- Released: May 2011
- Introductory price: Best Buy: US$499.99
- Operating system: Android 2.3.3 "Gingerbread"; Upgradable to Android 3.2 "Honeycomb"
- CPU: 1.5 GHz Qualcomm Snapdragon
- Memory: 1 GB DDR2 RAM
- Storage: Flash memory eMMC: 32 GB
- Display: 7-inch 1024×600 px
- Input: Multi-touch capacitive touchscreen display HTC Scribe Capacitive Stylus
- Camera: 5.0 megapixel rear-facing 1.3 megapixel, front-facing
- Connectivity: HSDPA 900 / 1700 / 2100 Wi-Fi 802.11b/g/n Bluetooth 3.0 (with A2DP)
- Power: 4000 mAh Lithium-ion battery or AC
- Dimensions: 195.4 mm (7.69 in) (h); 122 mm (4.8 in) (w); 13.2 mm (0.52 in) (d)
- Weight: 415 g (14.6 oz)
- Successor: Nexus 9

The HTC Flyer (also known as the HTC EVO View 4G) is a tablet computer by HTC Corporation. It was announced at the Mobile World Congress (MWC) 2011 and released in May 2011. Unlike other tablets announced at MWC, the Flyer had a single-core 1.5 GHz CPU and ran 2.3.3 (Gingerbread). In February 2011 it was reported that HTC had claimed via Facebook that "Flyer will be getting a Honeycomb upgrade in Q2", however an HTC representative subsequently stated "I can confirm that we are working to bring a Honeycomb update to Flyer in short order – however, I don't have any specific information on what the timing may be." The version running Android 3.2 Honeycomb was released later in 2011. The HTC Flyer can be updated up to Android 4.1.2 Jelly Bean through the use of custom ROMs.

It has a 7-inch TFT display and includes some special features, such as pen input as well as touch input. A Wi-Fi variant was launched on May 22 and it was available via Best Buy. The product was discontinued in December 2011.

== Key features ==
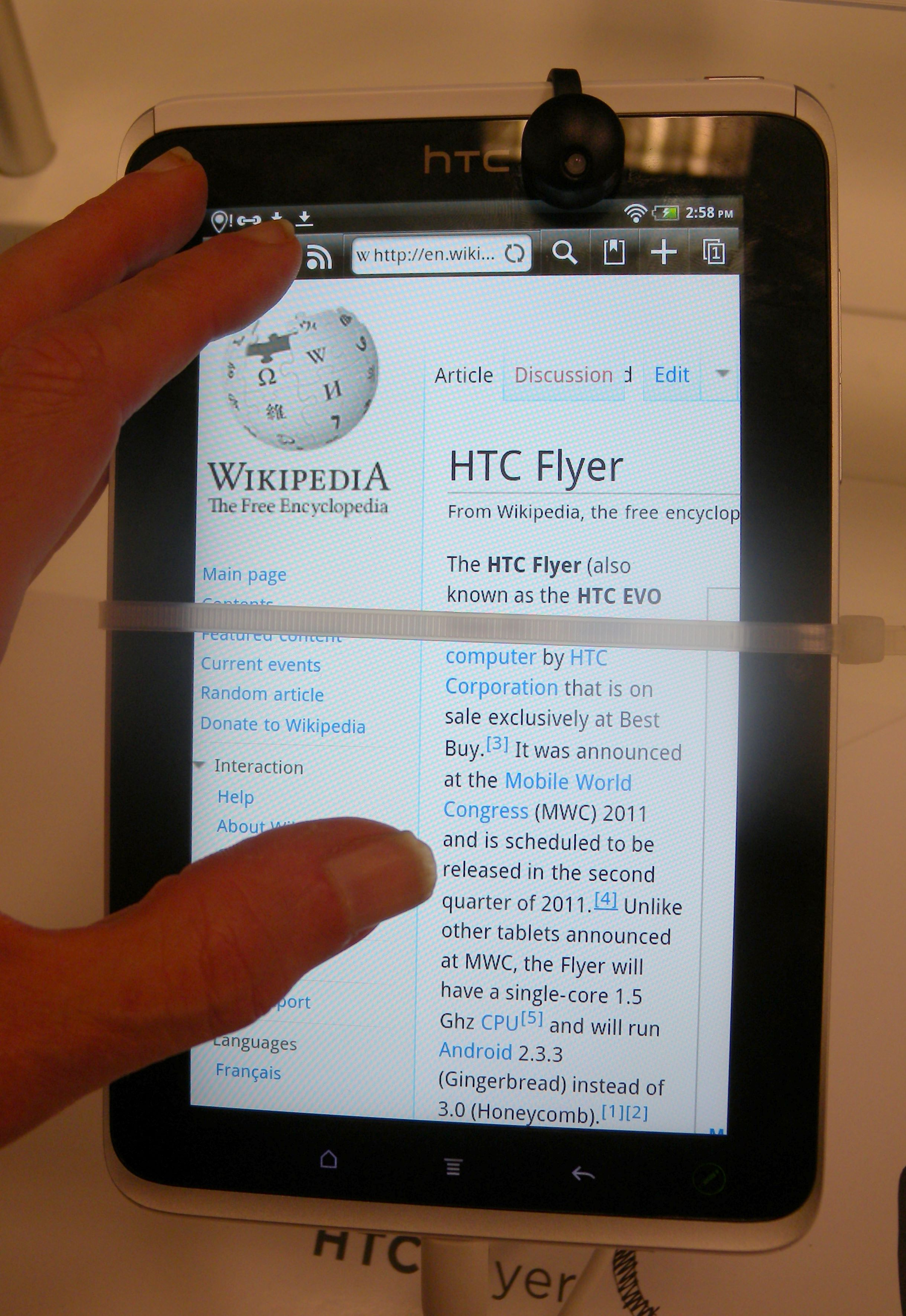
In use

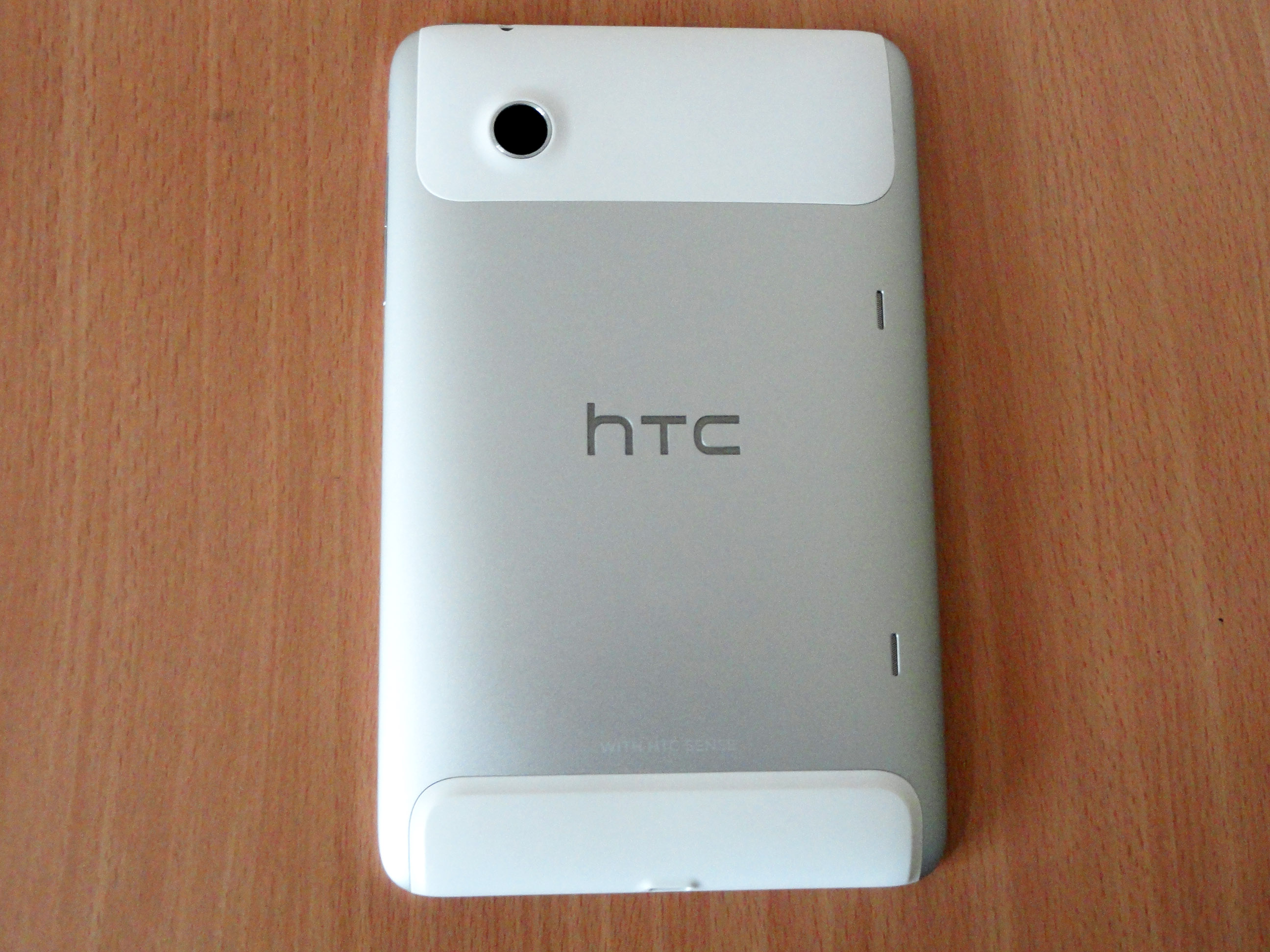
HTC Flyer- Back

- An optional HTC Scribe digital pen using HTC Scribe technology running on top of N-trig DuoSense hardware, by which a user can capture and annotate any on-screen content with notes and drawings using a battery-powered, active, non-capacitive digital stylus.
- 7" 1024×600 display with multi-touch capability
- Integration and compatibility with Wi-Fi and Bluetooth 3.0
- Built-in dual microphones for noise reduction
- Android operating system
- Adobe Flash 10.3 and HTML5 support

== Hardware ==
- 5 MP Color CMOS camera with auto focus
- 1.3 MP front camera for video chatting
- 32 GB eMMC memory plus microSD card slot
- 4,000 mAh battery

"The HTC Flyer features an immersive 3D user experience that brings to life, all your favorite content - weather, email and even ebooks." Best Buy was the exclusive retailer for the spring 2011 launch.
