= Surface Pen =

Digital pen made by Microsoft

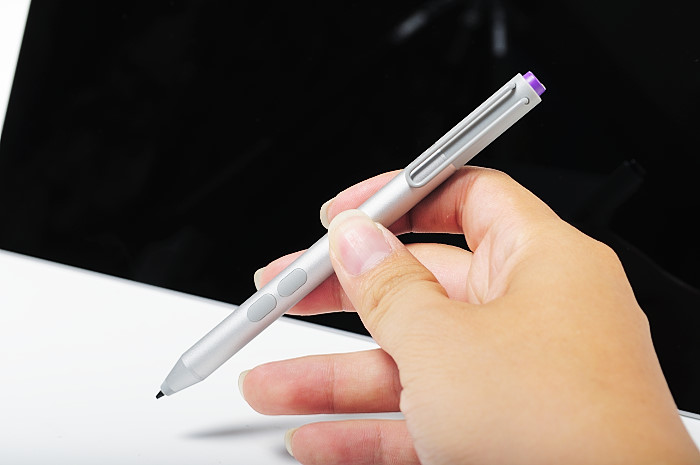
- Surface Pen (2nd generation)
- Also known as: Surface Pro Pen
- Developer: Microsoft Corporation
- Type: Digital stylus
- Released: July 18, 2012
- Introductory price: US$49.99
- Dimensions: Length: 145mm; Diameter: 9.5mm (9.7mm to flat edge)
- Weight: 0.04 lbs. (20 g)
- Website: www.microsoft.com/surface/en-us/accessories/pen

The Surface Pen is an active stylus and digital pen developed by Microsoft for its series of Surface computing devices. It is designed to showcase the pen computing capabilities of Microsoft's Windows 8/8.1, Windows 10 and Windows 11 operating systems.

== First generation ==
The first Surface Pen was introduced in 2012 alongside the Surface Pro, which uses Penabled technology designed by Wacom. It features one physical button on the side to simulate a right-click when the pen comes into contact with the display, as well as an eraser tip at the top of the Pen that removes ink strokes when it comes into contact with the display. It was bundled with the Surface Pro and Surface Pro 2, but is not compatible with other models. The button on the pen doubles as a magnetic clip which can be used to attach the pen to the Surface charging port (although not while simultaneously charging the device). Although the technology was deprecated with subsequent generations and is now branded as "Pro Pen", it can still be purchased as an accessory for the Surface Pro and Surface Pro 2 as well as other Penabled-compatible devices such as those from Lenovo ThinkPad lineup.

== Second generation ==
=== Surface Pro 3 - Model 1616 ===
The Surface Pen Model 1616 was launched in 2014 with the Surface Pro 3. Based on technology developed by N-trig (a separate company at the time, though subsequently acquired by Microsoft), the Surface Pro 3 version lacks the eraser tip present in the previous generation; erasing is done by drawing over the ink strokes while holding down one of two physical buttons on the side, above the button used for right-clicking. A third button, located at the back of the pen, sends a Bluetooth signal to a paired Surface PC which instantly opens OneNote, even when the device is locked (although advanced editing functions are disabled in this case). Unlike the Wacom-powered Surface Pen, it requires two batteries: one AAAA battery for stylus operation, and two size 319 coin cell batteries for the top button. The pen is included with all Surface Pro 3s but is also compatible with and available as an optional accessory for the Surface 3. Unlike the previous pen, this version can be stowed away by sliding it into a self-adhesive felt loop which can be attached to the Surface Type Cover (optional extra). It is also compatible with all subsequent Surface PCs, which uses the same basic technology. Surface Pro 3 Pen is able to detect 256 levels of pressure on its tip.

Model numbers are 3UY-00001 (Silver), 3UY-00012 (Black), 3UY-00021 (Red), 3UY-00030 (Blue).

== Third generation ==
=== Surface Pro 4 - Model 1710 ===
With the release of the Surface Pro 4, Microsoft introduced the Surface Pen Model 1710. While using the same technology as the Surface Pro 3 pen, it has only one (non-customizable) button on the side rather than two, and brings back the top-mounted eraser (retaining the button functionality) and also allows customizing the button (called the "magic button") to perform different actions. The default options are: single-click opens OneNote, double-click takes a screenshot, press-and-hold launches Cortana. This generation saw the return of the magnetic attachment, although this time the pen snaps into place on the opposite side of the Surface device, thereby freeing up the charging port (now called the Surface Connect port). This version of the pen is bundled with the Surface Pro 4, the Surface Book and the Surface Studio; it can also be purchased separately for the Surface Laptop. It is also compatible with the Surface Pro 3 and Surface 3. The pen of the third generation is able to detect 1024 levels of pressure on its tip. Latency drops to just 45 milliseconds in comparison with Surface Pro 3 Pen.

Model numbers are 3XY-00001 (Silver), 3XY-00011 (Black), 3XY-00021 (Dark Blue) and 3XY-00051 (Gold).

A set of 4 interchangeable pen tips were included with this pen, but only made available as an option (Model RJ3-00003) for the fourth generation pen. The tips are marked using the same nomenclature used for pencil hardness 2H, H, HB, B.

=== Surface Hub ===
The Surface Hub, released in June 2015, ships with a pair of digital pens that employ technology similar to the Surface Pen for PCs. Holstered to each side of the device, they have eraser tips but no extra buttons. They integrate with the built-in Whiteboard app and, unlike the Surface Pen, can both be used for simultaneously inking by multiple users.

== Fourth generation ==
=== Surface Pro 5 (2017) - Model 1776 ===
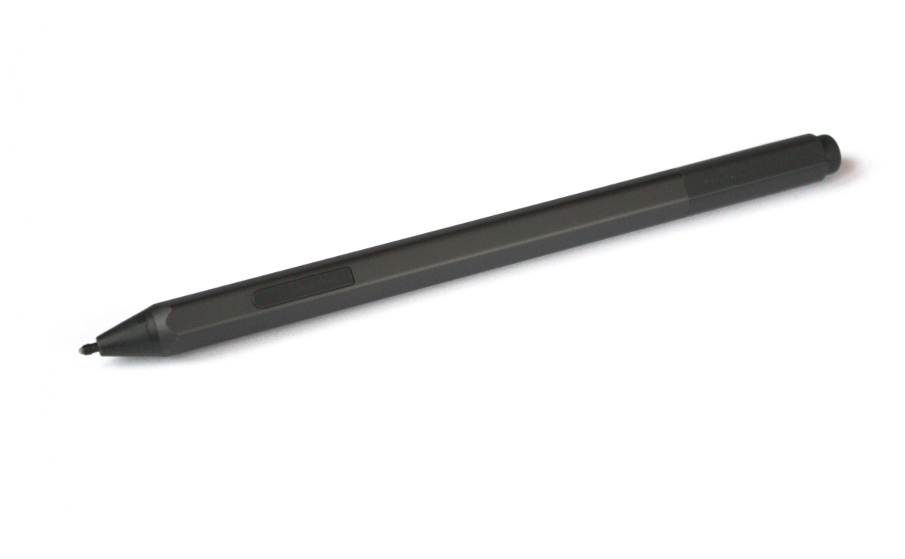
Surface Pen (4th generation)

Microsoft introduced the Surface Pen Model 1776 with the release of the Surface Pro 5th gen, . Unlike previous generations of the Surface Pen, this version of the pen is sold separately at a higher price of $99. It is also compatible with Surface 3, Surface Pro 3, Surface Pro 4, Surface Pro 6, Surface Pro 7, Surface Pro X, Surface Go, Surface Go 2, Surface Studio, Surface Studio 2, Surface Book, Surface Book 2, Surface Book 3, Surface Laptop, Surface Laptop 2 and Surface Laptop 3. The new Surface Pen is able to detect 4096 levels of pressure and has 1024 levels of tilt sensitivity, which was not available in previous generations. It has 21 milliseconds of latency, making it "the fastest digital pen on the planet” at the time of release, according to Microsoft.

Model numbers are:

- EYU-00001/EYU-00002/EYU-00003 (Black)
- EYU-00009/EYU-00010 (Platinum)
- EYU-00017/EYU-00018 (Cobalt Blue)
- EYV-00025/EYU-00025/EYU-00026 (Burgundy)
- EYU-00041/EYU-00042/EYU-00043 (Poppy Red)
- EYU-00049/EYU-00050/EYU-00051 (Ice Blue)

== Fifth generation ==
=== Surface Pro 6 ===
This Surface Pen was released alongside the Surface Pro 6 on October 2, 2018, representing a refinement of Microsoft’s active stylus for its Surface line. Building on the N-trig–based technologies introduced in earlier models, it features 4,096 levels of pressure sensitivity, tilt support for natural shading, and nearly imperceptible inking latency to enhance precision in writing and drawing. Connectivity is provided via Bluetooth 4.0, enabling button remapping for quick access to OneNote and other apps, while the integrated eraser on the tail end allows intuitive correction without switching tools. The pen attaches magnetically to compatible Surface devices for secure storage and is powered by a single AAAA battery, offering several months of uninterrupted use under typical workloads.

== Surface Slim Pen ==
=== First generation (Surface Pro X) ===
With the release of the Surface Pro X, Microsoft introduced the Surface Slim Pen, a new design resembling a carpenter pencil. Like the previous generation of the Surface Pen, it was sold separately but was also available bundled with the Surface Pro X Signature Type Cover. The Slim Pen is powered by a non-removable internal rechargeable battery which is charged wirelessly by resting it in the cradle of a supported cover or an optional charger.

=== Second generation (Surface Pro 8) ===
The Surface Slim Pen 2, a refreshed Slim Pen, was released alongside the Surface Pro 8. The design and performance of the Surface Slim Pen was improved, and the tip of the pen is sharper. It is compatible with several charging accessories and can be charged on several Surface devices. The model additionally utilizes pen tips that can be removed and replaced.

== See also ==
- Microsoft hardware
- Microsoft pen protocol
- Pen computing
- Digital pen
- Stylus (computing)
- Apple Pencil
- S Pen
- Microsoft Tablet PC
- Samsung Galaxy Note series
- Universal Stylus Initiative
