= Notability =

Notability may refer to:

- Notability (application), a note-taking IOS application
- Notability, a 1993 album by the Swingles
- Notability in the English Wikipedia
