= Notability (application) =

Note-taking application

- Developers: Ginger Labs, Inc.
- Release: April 1, 2010; 16 years ago
- Stable release: 16.4 / November 17, 2026; 2 days ago
- Written in: Swift, Typescript, Objective-C
- Operating system: iOS iPadOS macOS; Android
- Platform: Mobile application Web application Desktop application
- License: Proprietary software Freemium
- Website: Official website

Notability
- Type: Private
- Industry: Software
- Founded: November 5, 2008
- Founder: Fred Mitchell
- Headquarters: San Francisco, CA
- Key people: Fred Mitchell (Chief Executive Officer)
- Products: Notability, Notability Web, Notability for Business
- Number of employees: 105 (2025)

Notability is a note-taking and PDF annotation application developed by Ginger Labs, Inc. for iOS, iPadOS, macOS, Windows, Android, and web browsers. The application allows users to combine handwritten and typed notes with sketches, images, and audio recordings in a single document. The app is widely used by students, educators, and professionals for digital note-taking, annotation, and organization across multiple platforms. In 2026, Notability was awarded Best App of 2026 in the Google Play Store. Ginger Labs, Inc. is headquartered in San Francisco.

== History ==
Ginger Labs, Inc. was founded on November 5, 2008 by Fred Mitchell in California. Following the launch of the Apple App Store earlier that year, Mitchell identified an opportunity to develop software applications for iPhone. The company’s first project focused on transforming the iPhone into a hearing assistance device, leading to the development of soundAMP, an app designed to amplify nearby sounds through the device’s earbuds. The app was released in 2009.

After the introduction of the iPad in January 2010, Ginger Labs began exploring ideas that would take advantage of the iPad’s larger display and integrate its existing audio recording technology. This exploration led to the concept of linking handwritten or typed notes with synchronized audio recordings.

Version 1 of Notability was first released on April 1, 2010 by Ginger Labs, coinciding with the launch of the iPad. Over subsequent years, the app expanded significantly, adding features such as PDF import and annotation, an iPhone version, iCloud syncing across devices, and support for Apple Pencil, which improved handwriting performance and palm rejection. Additional capabilities introduced later included handwriting recognition and search, math equation conversion, drag-and-drop file support, multi-note functionality, shapes and document scanning, a public gallery for sharing note templates and annual planners.

The concept of linking notes with audio recordings was developed with classroom use in mind, particularly for students who wished to review lectures more effectively. The app gained early popularity among iPad users for its intuitive handwriting and recording features, which allowed users to take written notes while simultaneously capturing synchronized audio.

In 2014, a desktop version of Notability was released for macOS, expanding its ecosystem and enabling cross-device syncing through iCloud.

In November 2021, Ginger Labs announced that Notability would transition from a one-time purchase to a freemium model, making the app free to download with a premium subscription tier for advanced features. Users who had previously purchased the app under a one-time payment model retained access to the version they had purchased, though new features were not guaranteed to be added to the legacy tier. This change aligned Notability with other productivity apps such as Evernote and GoodNotes.

In August 2023, the company introduced a redesigned interface with updated navigation, streamlined note organization, and accessibility improvements. The redesign aimed to modernize the user experience and improve efficiency for users managing large sets of notes across devices.

In 2025, the company began to integrate AI features into the application, including note summaries, quizzes and flashcards, and a chat tool. A web version of Notability was also released. In August 2025, the company began beta testing a new file format intended to support real-time collaboration and enhanced server-based syncing.

In July 2026, Notability re-introduced its one-time purchase plan, Classic, after deprecating it in 2021 when the app transitioned to a subscription model. Users who had purchased the app prior to 2021 would continue to have access to the version of Notability they had purchased.

In August 2026, the company launched Notability for Android on the Google Play Store.

In November 2026, Notability won Best App and Best Productivity Partner of 2026 in the Google Play Store.

== Pricing ==
Notability is free to use, and offers premium tiered subscriptions for advanced features. Subscription plans include Notability Starter (free), Lite, Classic, Plus, and Pro.

== Features ==
Like other note-taking software, Notability supports typing and drawing on a virtual notepad. Users can mark up a digital note with digital brushes, pencils, pens, and highlighters, in various sizes and colors. Photos, GIFs, stickers, digital sticky notes, and other media can also be inserted into a user's note. The app supports directly editing and exporting to the PDF file format, and supports many other document file formats. Files are synced to iCloud and users can share files with other users via a link-based system.

Notes can be organized into folders and subjects in the app, with the ability to search for any content in a note or audio transcription. Notes can be generated by creating a blank note, adding a template from the app's gallery of templates, scanning a document with a device's camera, or importing an image or PDF into the app.

The app also supports multiple other features including digital tape to cover and reveal areas of their note, simultaneous audio recording, and the conversion of handwriting and math equations to text. Notability supports the usage of a stylus on desktop platforms and the Apple Pencil on the iPad. The pencil brush in Notability includes texture and pressure sensitivity when used with the Apple Pencil.

In 2021, Notability transitioned into a freemium model, making the app free to download with optional premium features such as handwriting-to-text conversion, unlimited editing tools, and advanced PDF annotation capabilities. The update also introduced cloud-based syncing and storage improvements through iCloud and third-party services.

A major redesign in 2023 introduced an updated interface, customizable toolbars, and improved accessibility options aimed at simplifying note organization and multitasking. Recent updates have added handwriting recognition, advanced search filters, and new digital pen textures for sketching and highlighting.

Most recently in 2025, Notability released an AI-powered feature called Notability Learn, using Anthropic's LLM Claude and Google's LLM Gemini. Notability Learn is used to generate a summary of a user's audio recording, handwritten note, or imported PDF. A chatbot feature is also included, allowing users to ask questions and get answers about a note's content. Notability Learn is also used to turn the content of a user's note into quiz questions and flashcards for review.

In August 2025, Notability announced it will be rolling out Notability Cloud, which allows for user's notes to be synced across both iOS and non-iOS devices.

In 2026, Notability announced more calendar integration and meeting note-taker features. This change aligned Notability with other meeting recording apps such as Granola and Otter.ai.

== Reception ==
Notability has been well-reviewed for its intuitive design, smooth handwriting experience, and usefulness in educational and professional settings. Comparative reviews such as Paperlike's "App Review: GoodNotes vs. Notability" have been highlighted Notability's ease of use and quick note organization, while Paperless X commended its fluid writing experience and regular updates that keep it competitive among digital note-taking apps.

== See also ==
- Apple Notes
- Evernote
