= Apple Pencil =

Line of stylus pens designed by Apple

- Apple Pencil (second generation)
- Developer: Apple Inc.
- Manufacturer: Apple Inc.
- Type: Digital stylus
- Released: November 11, 2015 (1st generation); November 7, 2018 (2nd generation); November 1, 2023 (USB-C); May 15, 2024 (Pro)
- Introductory price: US$99
- System on a chip: 32-bit RISC ARM-based Cortex-M3
- CPU: STMicroelectronics STM32L151UCY6 Ultra-low-power MCU @ 32 MHz
- Memory: 64-Kilobyte Flash
- Input: First generation: Lightning connector eight pin, Bluetooth 4.1; Second generation: Bluetooth 4.1
- Power: 3.82 V 0.329 W·h (86.1 mA·h)
- Dimensions: First generation: Length: 6.92 inches (176 mm) measured from tip to cap Diameter: 0.35 inches (8.9 mm) Second generation: Length: 6.53 inches (166 mm); Diameter: 0.35 inches (8.9 mm) USB-C: Length: 6.10 inches (155 mm); Diameter: 0.29 inches (7.4 mm)
- Weight: 0.73 ounces (21 g)
- Website: www.apple.com/apple-pencil/

The Apple Pencil is a line of wireless stylus pen accessories designed and developed by Apple for use with supported iPad tablets and the iPhone Duo.

The first-generation Apple Pencil was announced alongside the first iPad Pro on September 9, 2015. It communicates wirelessly via Bluetooth and has a removable cap that conceals a Lightning connector used for charging. The Pencil is compatible with the first- and second-generation iPad Pro models, and the sixth through eleventh-generation iPad models (with the latter two requiring a USB-C adapter).

The second-generation Apple Pencil was announced on October 30, 2018, alongside the third-generation iPad Pro, and is used with most iPad models from 2018 through 2022 that contain a USB-C port (excluding the base iPads). It uses a magnetic connector on the side of the tablet for charging rather than a Lightning port, and includes touch-sensitive areas that can be tapped to perform actions within supported apps. A successor to the second-generation Apple Pencil known as Apple Pencil Pro was released in 2024; which adds roll and squeezing gestures, as well as haptic feedback. It is used on non-base iPad models released since 2024.

In October 2023, Apple announced an entry-level Apple Pencil model, intended as an entry-level model for iPad models with USB-C ports; this version removes the pen pressure sensitivity, touch-sensitive areas, and magnetic charging features, and is charged using a USB-C connector concealed by sliding up its cap.

Apple has promoted the Pencil as being oriented towards creative work and productivity; during its unveiling, the Pencil's drawing capabilities were demonstrated using the mobile version of Adobe Photoshop, and its document-annotation capabilities were shown on several Microsoft Office apps.

== Specifications ==
=== First generation ===
The Apple Pencil has pressure sensitivity and angle detection, and it was designed for low latency to enable smooth marking on the screen. The Pencil and the user's fingers can be used simultaneously while rejecting input from the user's palm. One end of the device has a magnetically-fastened removable cap which covers a Lightning connector which is used for charging from an iPad's Lightning port. A complete charge lasts about twelve hours, fifteen seconds of charging provides sufficient power for 30 minutes of use and it takes about 10 minutes to charge it fully. It also ships with a female-to-female Lightning adapter that allows it to be used with charging cables.

The Apple Pencil uses an STMicroelectronics STM32L151UCY6 Ultra-low-power 32-bit RISC ARM-based Cortex-M3 MCU running at 32 MHz with 64 KB of flash memory, a Bosch Sensortech BMA280 3-axis accelerometer and a Cambridge Silicon Radio (Qualcomm) CSR1012A05 Bluetooth Smart IC for its Bluetooth connection to the iPad. It is powered by a rechargeable 3.82 V, 0.329 Wh lithium-ion battery.

The first-generation Apple Pencil is compatible with iPad models released since 2018 that have a Lightning connector, including the first- and second-generation iPad Pro models, third-generation iPad Air, fifth-generation iPad Mini, sixth-generation 9.7-inch iPad, and the seventh, eighth, and ninth-generation 10.2-inch iPad models. It also supports the tenth-generation and eleventh-generation iPads, but requires a dongle (similar to the aforementioned Lightning adapter) to connect it to a USB-C cable for charging. Apple began to bundle this dongle with Pencil units in October 2022, and it can be purchased separately by existing owners.

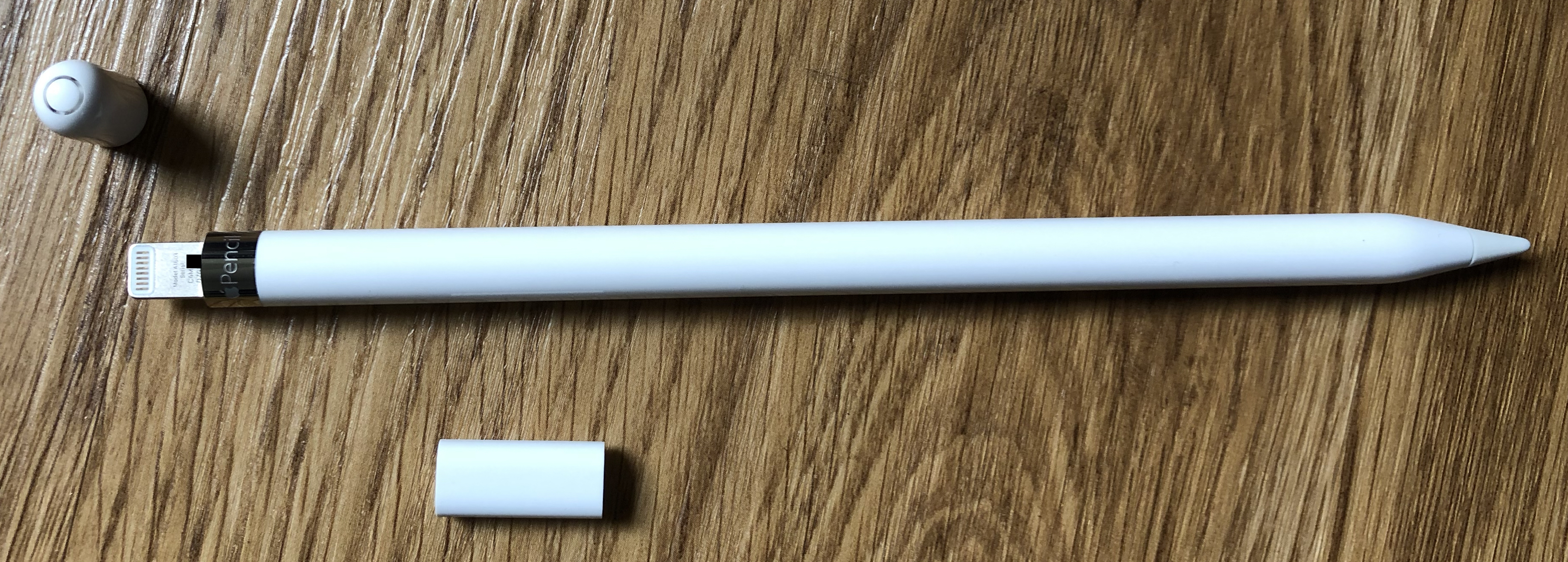
The first generation Apple Pencil, with its Lightning connector exposed. The accompanying female-to-female Lightning adapter is below the Pencil.

=== Second generation ===
On October 30, 2018, Apple announced an updated Pencil alongside the third-generation iPad Pro. It is similar in design and specifications to the first model, but without the detachable connector, and part of the stylus is flattened to inhibit rolling. It contains tap-sensitive zones on its sides that can be mapped to functions within apps. The sixth-generation iPad Pro added the ability to detect Pencil position and angle up to 12 millimetres (0.47 in) above the screen. Custom laser engraving is available when purchased via the Apple Store online.

Rather than a physical Lightning connector, the second-generation Pencil is paired and charged using a proprietary magnetic wireless charging connector on selected iPad models. As such, it only supports the third-, fourth-, fifth- and sixth-generation iPad Pro, sixth-generation iPad Mini, and the fourth- and fifth-generation iPad Air. All of these models have USB-C ports instead of Lightning, making them physically incompatible with the first-generation Pencil.

=== USB-C ===
On October 17, 2023, Apple announced a new entry-level Pencil model. This variant lacks pressure sensitivity and the tap-sensitive zones of the second-generation Pencil, but still supports hover detection on supported iPad models. It is charged via a physical USB-C connector concealed by sliding up its cap, and is compatible with all iPad models that include a USB-C port.

On September 9, 2026, Apple announced iPhone Duo, the first foldable iPhone. The iPhone Duo supports the Apple Pencil USB-C, making it the first iPhone model to support Apple's stylus.

=== Apple Pencil Pro ===
Apple Pencil Pro

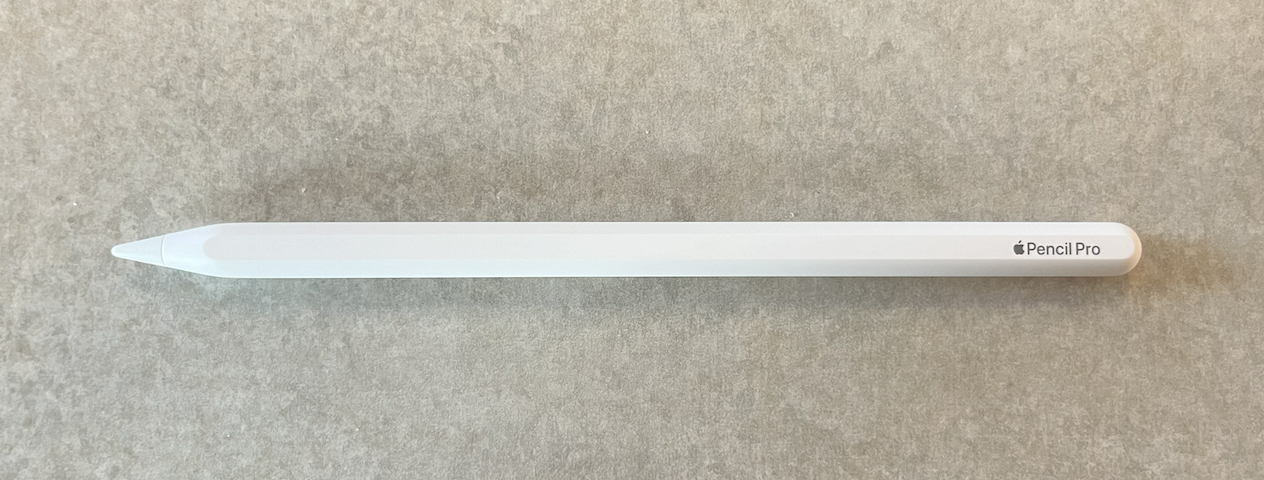
- Apple Pencil Pro
- Developer: Apple Inc.
- Manufacturer: Apple Inc.
- Product family: Apple Pencil
- Type: Digital Stylus
- Generation: 1st
- Released: May 7, 2024
- Introductory price: US$129
- Dimensions: Length: 166 mm (6.53 inches) Diameter: 8.9 mm (0.35 inches)
- Weight: 19.15 grams (0.68 ounces)
- Backward compatibility: iPad Pro (M4) and later, iPad Air (M2) and later, iPad Mini (A17 Pro) and later
- Website: www.apple.com/apple-pencil/

On May 7, 2024, Apple announced Apple Pencil Pro; this model adds sensors allowing new squeeze and rolling gestures, as well as haptic feedback and support for Find My.

Similarly to the second-generation Pencil, it is paired and charged using a proprietary magnetic wireless charging connector. It is only supported by the iPad Pro (M4) and newer, iPad Air (M2) and newer, and iPad Mini (A17 Pro) and newer.

== Hardware support ==
Supported Apple Pencils on the iPad
iPad models	Connector	Year	Pencil 1st gen	Pencil 2nd gen	Pencil USB-C	Pencil Pro
iPad Pro
iPad Pro (M5)	USB-C	2025	No	No	Yes	Yes
iPad Pro (M4)	USB-C	2024	No	No	Yes	Yes
iPad Pro (6th gen)	USB-C	2022	No	Yes	Yes	No
iPad Pro (5th gen)	USB-C	2021	No	Yes	Yes	No
iPad Pro (4th gen)	USB-C	2020	No	Yes	Yes	No
iPad Pro (3rd gen)	USB-C	2018	No	Yes	Yes	No
iPad Pro (2nd gen)	Lightning	2017	Yes	No	No	No
iPad Pro (1st gen)	Lightning	2015	Yes	No	No	No
iPad Air
iPad Air (M4)	USB-C	2026	No	No	Yes	Yes
iPad Air (M3)	USB-C	2025	No	No	Yes	Yes
iPad Air (M2)	USB-C	2024	No	No	Yes	Yes
iPad Air (5th gen)	USB-C	2022	No	Yes	Yes	No
iPad Air (4th gen)	USB-C	2020	No	Yes	Yes	No
iPad Air (3rd gen)	Lightning	2019	Yes	No	No	No
iPad mini
iPad Mini (A20 Pro)	USB-C	2026	No	No	Yes	Yes
iPad Mini (A17 Pro)	USB-C	2024	No	No	Yes	Yes
iPad Mini (6th gen)	USB-C	2021	No	Yes	Yes	No
iPad Mini (5th gen)	Lightning	2019	Yes	No	No	No
iPad
iPad (A16)	USB-C	2025	Yes	No	Yes	No
iPad (10th gen)	USB-C	2022	Yes	No	Yes	No
iPad (9th gen)	Lightning	2021	Yes	No	No	No
iPad (8th gen)	Lightning	2020	Yes	No	No	No
iPad (7th gen)	Lightning	2019	Yes	No	No	No
iPad (6th gen)	Lightning	2018	Yes	No	No	No

== See also ==
- List of iPad accessories
- List of digital art software
- Pen computing
- Digital pen
- Active pen
- Stylus
- Surface Pen
- S Pen
- Microsoft Tablet PC
- Samsung Galaxy Note series
- Universal Stylus Initiative
