= Orion Live Ink =

- Developer: Orion India Systems Pvt. Ltd.
- Release: August 2014
- Written in: C#
- Operating system: Windows 10
- Website: www.orioninc.com/education/

Orion Live Ink is a digitisation method which uses character recognition technology and question paper rubrics to publish examination results. It is an OWASP Top 10 and CERT-IN Standards certified secure application (certificate number SB/OISPL/#3427).

== Development ==
The solution consists of a digital pen, tablet and a special printed paper used as the top sheet on answer booklets. The digital pen is used by an examiner to write marks on the top sheet. The pen digitizes marks in real time and transfers data to the tablet. The allotted marks is displayed on the tablet in handwritten form as well as digitized format. Once the user validates marks in the tablet, the data is encrypted and transferred to the centralized server of the education board.

== Features ==
- The tablet handles question paper rubrics application, marks totalling and captures the date and time of evaluation.
- Once the marks are validated, the tablet as well as the digital pen does not contain any residual data.
- An OLICR pen and tablet set could be shared by several evaluators at an evaluation camp since the set would be required only at the time of writing the marks on the top sheet, which would take approximately less than a minute per answer script.
- Evaluators will continue to check and correct answer sheets using traditional pen and paper method of evaluation. So, there is no additional learning cycle required while using OLICR devices.
- Once the marks data is transferred to the central servers, it is immediately available for download in the education board's server.

== Board exams and entrance tests ==
Board examination results is a deciding factor for students who aim to apply in reputed colleges and institutes for further studies. The national and state-level competitive entrance examinations are often held at a date convenient to the respective college or institute organising the examination. One of the criteria to apply for these examinations is the board examination results. So, students wait for their tenth or twelfth board examination results to enable them to apply for entrance examinations. To make schools relevant to changing trends, school education boards and councils have started adopting new technology and methods to enable faster and accurate marks publication. By doing this, the boards and councils earn the goodwill of their students and also enhance their credibility in the market.

== Reception ==
The Council of Indian School Certificate Examination (CISCE), a premier private board of school education in India, has utilized OLICR technology for academic year 2016 to publish marks. With the use of this technology, the results was published 2 weeks earlier than expected. The solution won the National Award for the Most Innovative Product in the Testing & Assessment Category held at the e-India Summit held at Kovalam, Kerala State, India in mid-November 2014.

== See also ==
- Character recognition
- Rubric (academic)
- Tablet computer
- Data encryption
- Data remanence
- List of institutions of higher education in India
- Board examination
- Matriculation
