= Universal Stylus Initiative =

Alliance proposing a technical standard for pen styluses

The Universal Stylus Initiative (USI) is a non-profit alliance of companies promoting a technical standard for interoperable active pen styluses on touchscreen devices such as phones, tablets, and computers.

It defines a two-way communication protocol between the stylus and the computer and allows the stylus to remember user preferences for ink color and stroke. It supports 9-axis inertial measurement.

Products started coming to market in 2019, including one stylus and several Chromebooks from different manufacturers. By 2019, there were over 30 members, including Google and 3M, but some major players like Apple and Microsoft had not joined. As of 2022, the promoters include Google, Intel, Lenovo, Samsung, and Synaptics. Dell, Sharp, and Wacom are contributors.

While USI promotes itself as an open standard, access to detailed specifications is restricted to paying members.

== History ==
USI was launched on April 23, 2015, by a group of prominent OEMs, stylus and touch controller manufacturers.

- September 22, 2016: Release of the USI 1.0 Stylus and Device Specification
- September 26, 2019: Announcement of the first 14 companies with products using the USI 1.0 Specification
- June 10, 2020: Launch of the USI active stylus certification program
- February 28, 2022: Release of USI Version 2.0 specification

== Features ==
=== USI 1.0 ===
1. Two-way communication protocol
2. Support for multiple simultaneous styluses on a single device
3. Pressure sensitivity (up to 2048 levels in USI 1.0)
4. Button presses and eraser functionality
5. Tilt detection
6. Supports a color palette of 256 colors

=== USI 2.0 ===
1. NFC wireless charging capability
2. Support for in-cell display panels
3. Expanded tilt functionality
4. Enhanced color palette with 16 million colors.
5. Enhanced pressure sensitivity (up to 4096 levels)

Some reports suggests backwards-compatibility issues at least in some devices, with some USI 1.0 pens not working with screens that are certified USI 2.0 compatible.

=== Certification process ===
According to the USI website, the certification process is from an end-user perspective and is a test of performance and interoperability. The website guarantees that the certification program offers:

Personal experience: Users can choose a product in a form factor that works for their convenience and still get all the features and functionality.

Predictable experience: All USI products will perform the same way.

Interoperability: Ensures that the USI-certified styluses will work on all devices.

== See also ==
- Stylus (computing)
- Digital pen
- Pen computing
- Active pen
- Wacom
- Surface Pen
- Apple Pencil
- Computer mouse
- Human–computer interaction
