= Active pen =

Type of input device

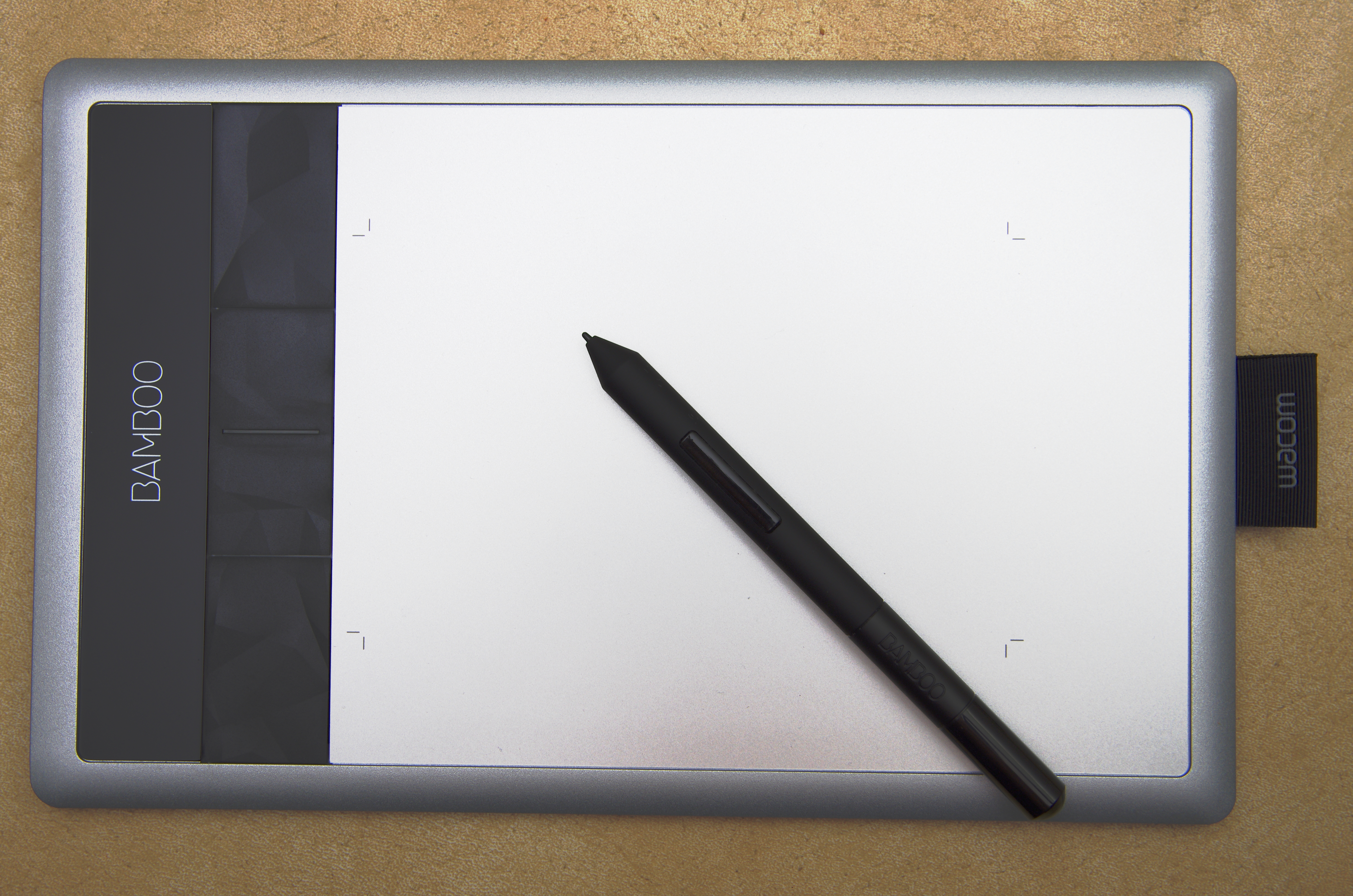
A Wacom Bamboo Capture graphics tablet with supplied inductive pen. The crop marks on the surface indicate the active area, which measures 14.7×9.2 cm or 5.8×3.6 in.

An active pen (also referred to as active stylus) is an input device that includes electronic components and allows users to write directly onto the display of a computing device such as a smartphone, tablet computer or ultrabook. The active pen marketplace has long been dominated by N-trig and Wacom, but newer firms Atmel and Synaptics also offer active pen designs.

An active pen is generally larger and has more features than a stylus. Digital pens typically contain internal electronics and have features such as touch sensitivity, input buttons, memory, writing data transmission capabilities, and electronic erasers.

The main difference between an active pen and the input device known as a passive stylus or passive pen is that although the latter can also be used to write directly onto the screen, it does not include electronics and thus lacks all of the features that are unique for an active pen: touch sensitivity, input buttons, etc. Active pen devices support most modern operating systems, including Google's Android and Microsoft Windows.

Active pens carried out by manufacturers such as Wacom Pro Pen 2 and Huion PW500/PW507 can support 8,192 levels of pressure sensitivity and tilt recognition with accuracy. Tilt feature of the active pen helps create natural-looking pen, brush, and eraser strokes in applications that support tilt sensitivity.

== Use ==
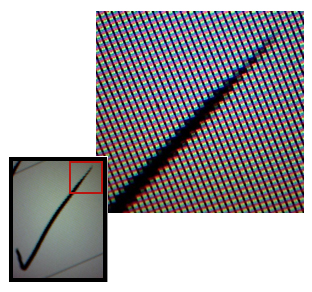
Active Pen, natural pressure sensing

Active pens are typically used for note taking, on-screen drawing/painting and electronic document annotation, as well as accurate object selection and scrolling. When used in conjunction with handwriting recognition software, the active pen's handwritten input can be converted to digital text, stored in a digital document, and edited in a text or drawing application.

== Active and positional pens ==
The electronic components generate wireless signals that are picked up by a digitizer and transmitted to its dedicated controller, providing data on pen location, pressure and other functionalities. Additional features enabled by the active pen's electronics include palm rejection to prevent unintended touch inputs, and hover, which allows the computer to track the pen's location when it is held near, but not touching the screen. Most active pens feature one or more function buttons (e.g. eraser and right-click) that can be used in the place of a mouse or keyboard.

== Technology groups ==
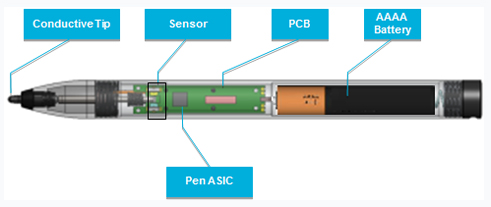
N-trig Duosens Pen, inside view

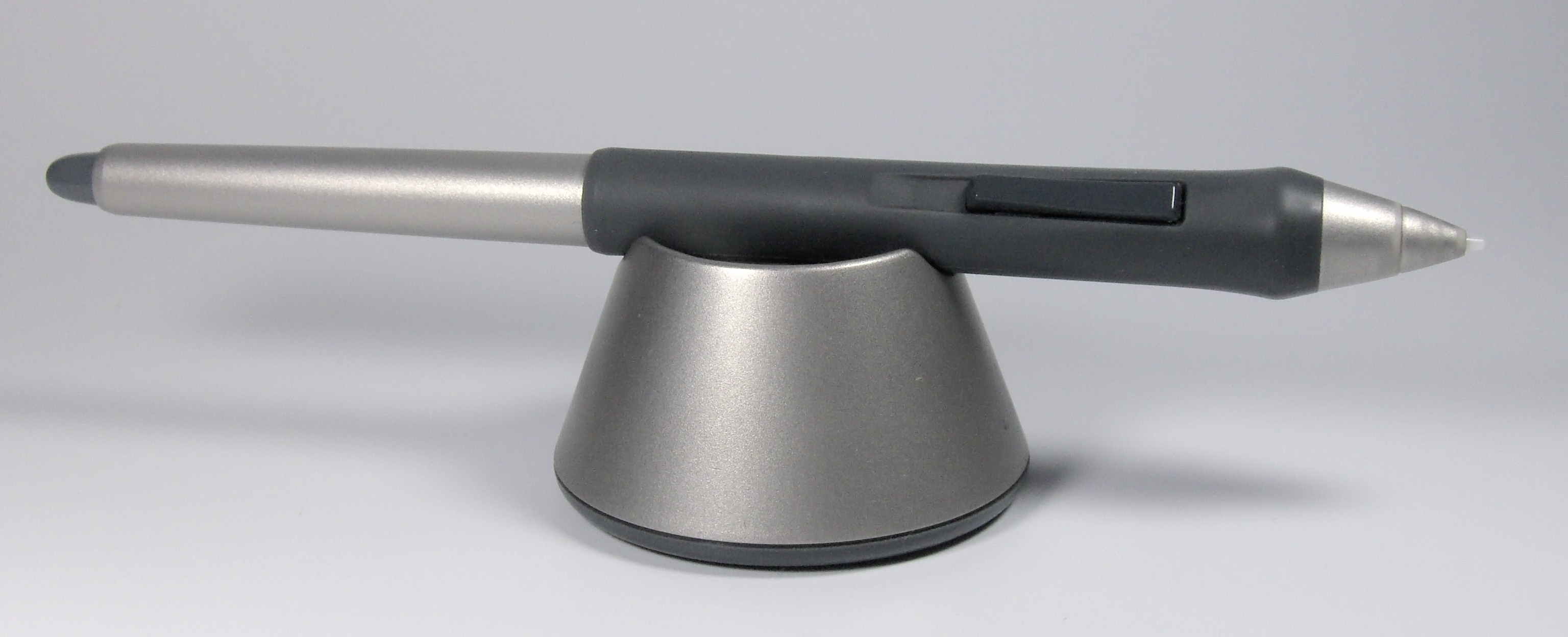
A Wacom digital pen

Active
Active pens, such as N-trig's DuoSense Pen, include electronic components whose signals are picked up by a mobile device's built-in digitizer and transmitted to its controller, providing data on pen location, pressure, button presses and other functionality.
Positional
Position-based digital pens use a facility to detect the location of the tip during writing. Some models can be found on graphics tablets made popular by Wacom, and on tablet computers using Wacom's Penabled technology.
Capacitive (multitouch compatible)
Capacitive pens multitouch compatible, generate a signal used by multitouch screen to detect the location of the tip during its movement while writing or drawing. They are compatible with most smartphones and tablets with capacitive-multitouch screen as iPhone, iPad, Samsung, LG, etc.

== See also ==
- Digital pen
- Pen computing
- Stylus (computing)
- Graphics tablet
- Tablet computer
- Microsoft Tablet PC
- Surface Pen
- Samsung Galaxy Note series
- Universal Stylus Initiative
