= Digital pen =

Input device

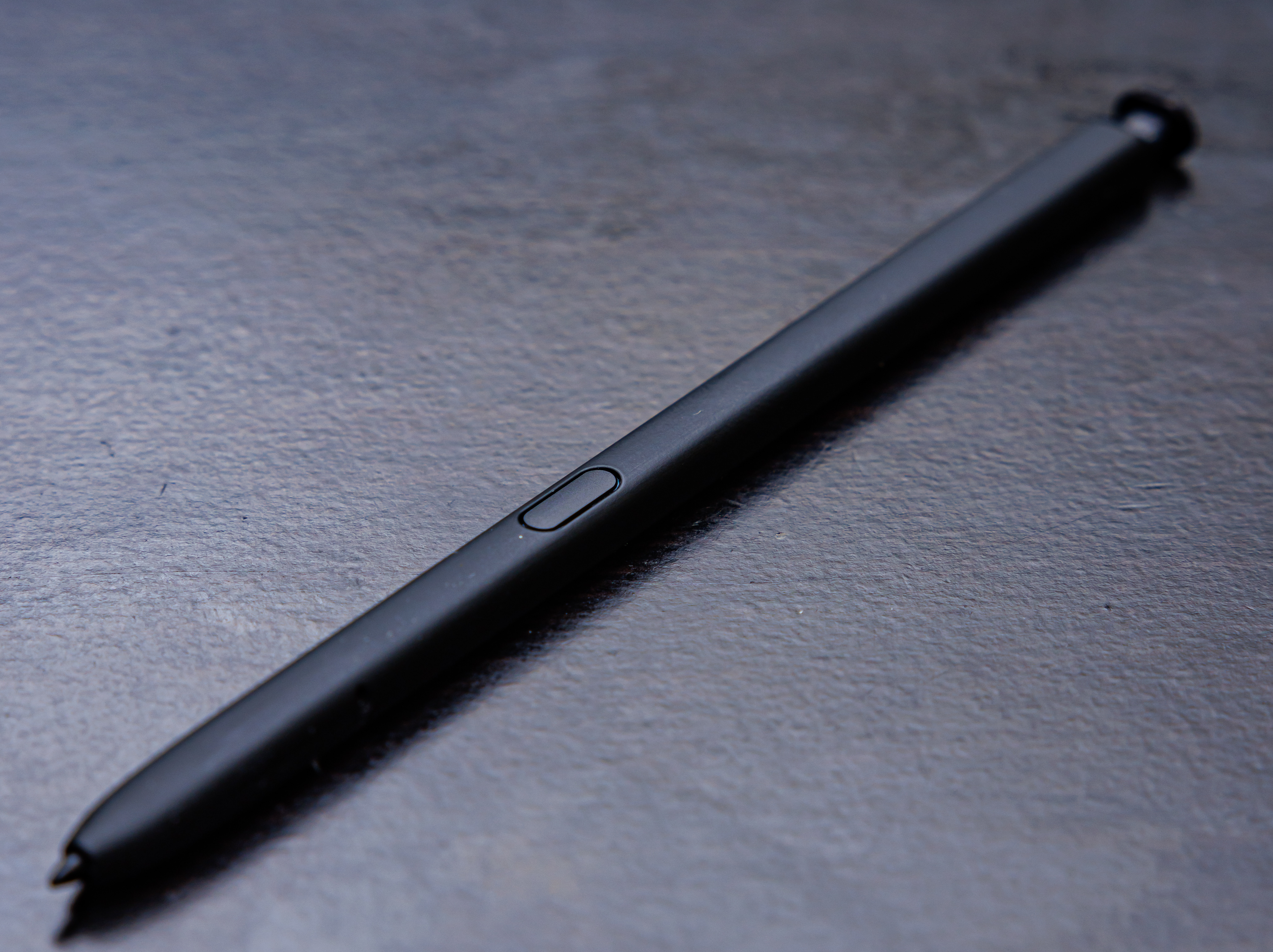
A black S Pen that shipped with the Samsung Galaxy S22 Ultra

A digital pen is an input device which captures the handwriting or brush strokes of a user and converts handwritten analog information into digital data, enabling the data to be utilized in various applications. This type of pen is used in conjunction with a graphics tablet, tablet computer, smartphone or digital notebook.

The input device captures the handwriting data, that, once digitized, can be displayed on a screen.

Common digital pen protocols are:

- Microsoft Pen Protocol (MPP) (formerly N-trig)
- Wacom AES 1.0 and 2.0
- Wacom EMR
- Universal Stylus Initiative (USI)
- Apple Pencil Active Projected Capacitive (APC)
- Bluetooth

Examples of digital pens:

- Microsoft Surface Pen (MPP)
- Samsung S Pen (Wacom EMR)
- Google Pixelbook Pen (Wacom AES)
- Apple Pencil (APC)

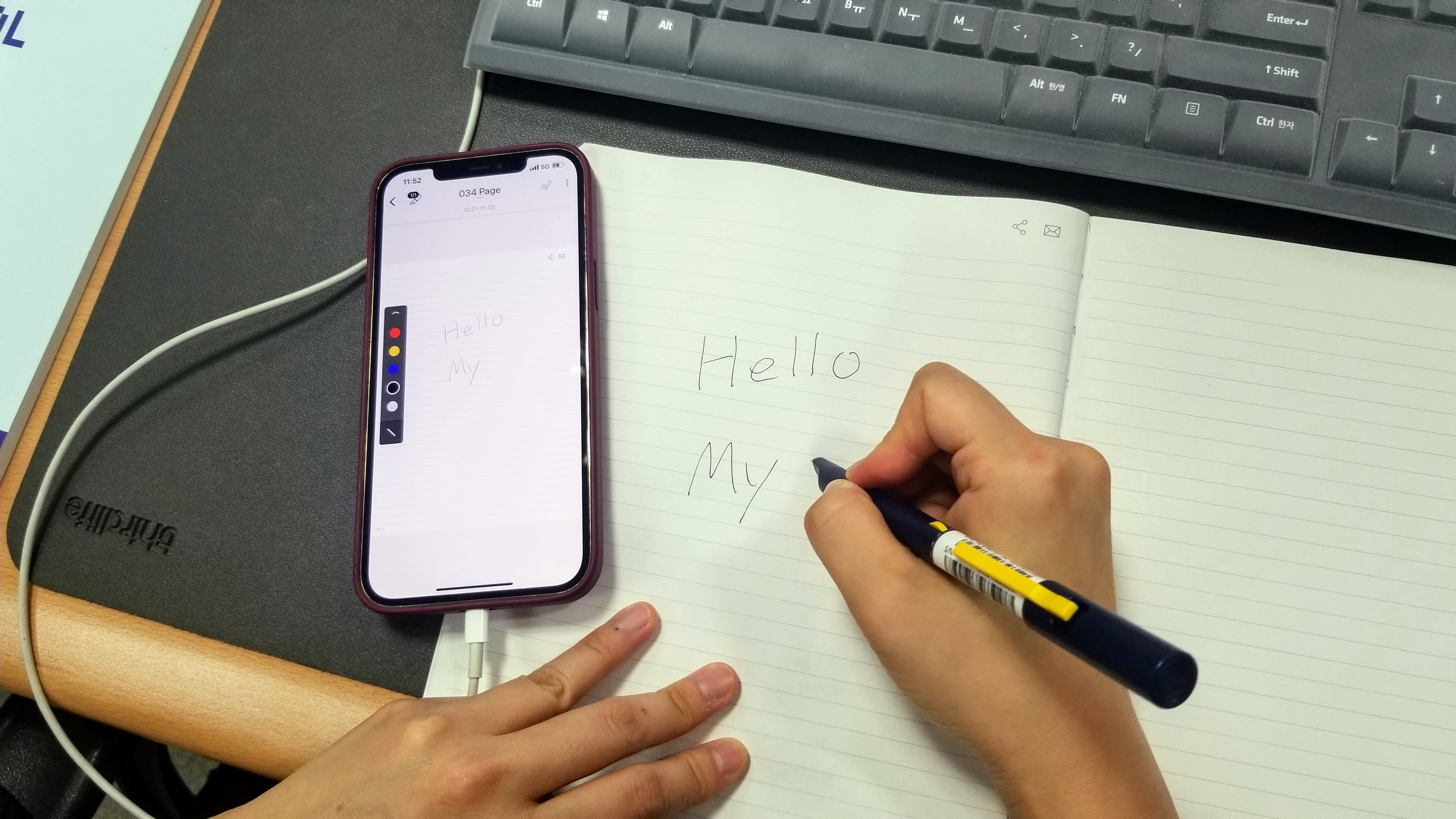
Smartpen by NeoLAB

== Technology groups ==
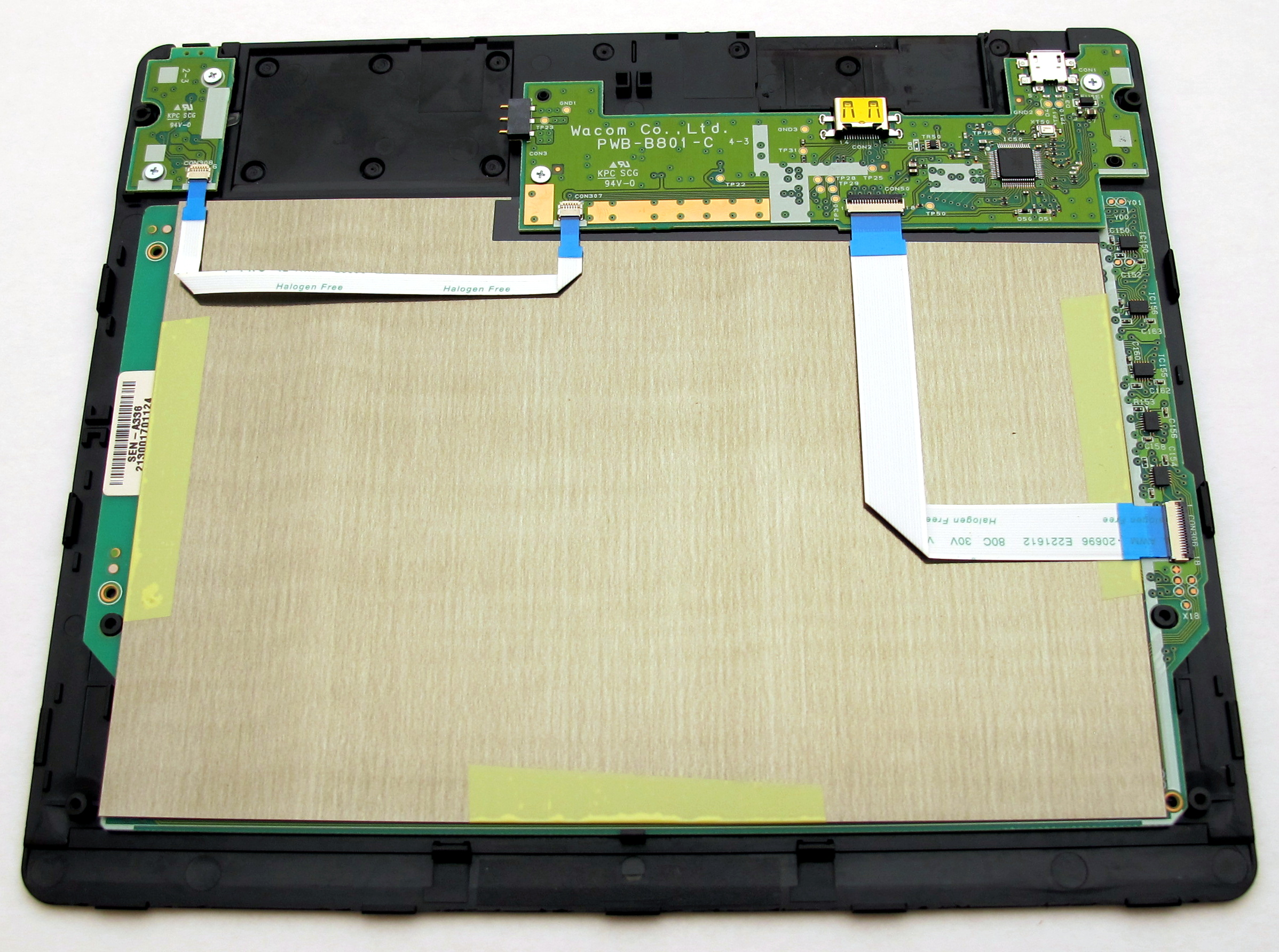
Interior view of a Wacom tablet

=== Active ===
Active pens, such as N-trig's DuoSense Pen, include electronic components whose signals are picked up by a mobile device's built-in digitizer and transmitted to its controller, providing data on pen location, pressure, button presses and other functionality.

Active Electrostatic (AES) pens are battery-powered styluses that actively communicate with the device's touchscreen. These pens emit a weak electrical signal that is detected by the device's touchscreen digitizer. AES technology offers high precision.

=== Positional ===
Position-based digital pens use a facility to detect the location of the tip during writing. Some models can be found on graphics tablets made popular by Wacom, and on tablet computers using Wacom's Penabled technology.

Electromagnetic Resonance (EMR) pens contain a circuit that resonates with the tablet's digitizer.

=== Accelerometer ===
Accelerometer-based digital pens contain components that detect movement of the pen and contact with the writing surface.

=== Camera ===
Camera-based pens use special digital paper to detect where the stylus contacts the writing surface, such as those using NeoLAB or/and Anoto technology.

=== Trackball pen ===
Trackball pens use a sensor that is located on the pen to detect the motion of the trackball.

== Smart pen ==
A smart pen has the same basic characteristics as a digital pen, but also has other features like voice recording or a text scanner. A smart pen is generally larger and has more features than an active pen. Digital pens typically contain internal electronics and have features such as touch sensitivity, input buttons, memory for storing handwriting data and transmission capabilities.

== Smartphone pens ==
Smartphone pens have become a popular tool for smartphone users who want to take notes, draw, or create digital art on their device.

== See also ==
- List of pen types, brands and companies
- S Pen
- Surface Pen
- Universal Stylus Initiative
- Active pen
- Stylus (computing)
- Pen computing
- Digital paper
- Bluetooth
- Light pen
- Live Ink Character Recognition Solution
- USB
