= Stylus (computing) =

Pen-shaped instrument used as a human-computer interface

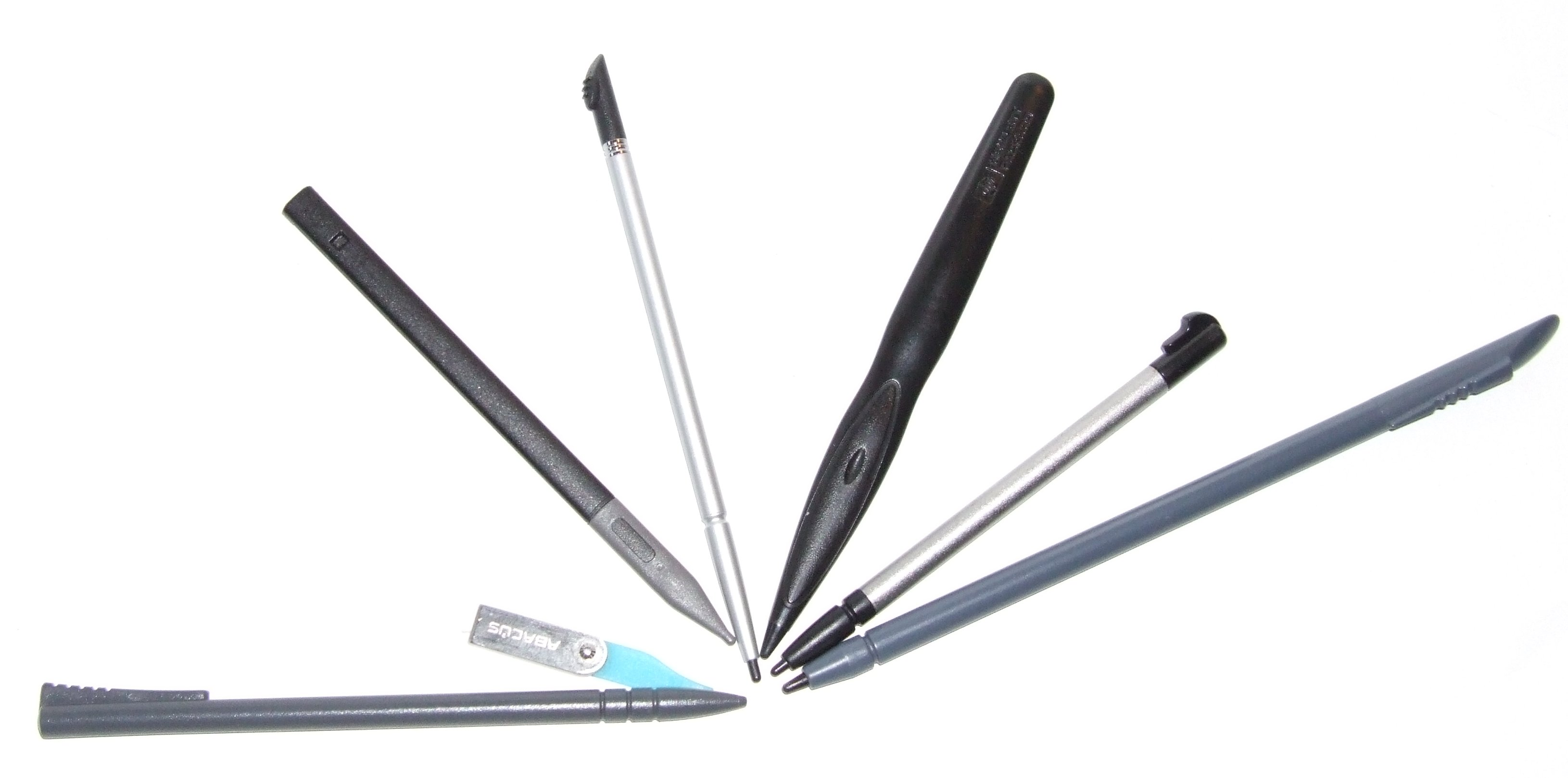
several styluses; (l to r) PalmPilot Professional, Fossil Wrist PDA, Nokia 770, Audiovox XV6600, HP Jornada 520, Sharp Zaurus 5500, Fujitsu Lifebook P-1032

In computing, a stylus (or stylus pen) is a small pen-shaped instrument whose tip position on a computer monitor can be detected. It is used to draw, or make selections by tapping. While devices with touchscreens such as laptops, smartphones, game consoles, and graphics tablets can usually be operated with a fingertip, a stylus can provide more accurate and controllable input.

== History ==
The earliest computer-related usage for a stylus was in 1643 with Pascal's calculator. The device had rotary dials that rotated in accordance with the selected numbers; with gears, drums, and clever engineering, it was capable of addition, subtraction, multiplication and division (using 9's constant). A stylus was used to turn the dials.

Later devices of this type include the Arithmometer, in the 1860s; and the Addiator, in 1920. The Addiator was a pocket mechanical adding machine that used a stylus to move tiny rigid slices of sheet-metal that were enclosed in a case. On the side of a slice of metal there were numbers that became visible to display the result. It was capable of addition, subtraction, multiplication and division. In 1967 there was a HEXADAT model, which allowed 4-function math to be applied to hexadecimal numbers for use in programming. The first use of a stylus in an electronic computing device was the Stylator, demonstrated by Tom Dimond in 1957.

== Types ==
=== Capacitive ===
Capacitive (also called passive) styluses emulate a finger by using a tip made of rubber or conductive foam; or metal such as copper. They do not need to be powered and can be used on any multi-touch surface that a finger can be used, typically capacitive screens that are common in smart phones and tablet computers. Stylus tips made of rubber or foam are often large, making it rather difficult to get precise notes or drawings.

Capacitive styluses work by distorting the screen’s electrostatic field. Screens that receive input from a capacitive stylus (as well as human fingers) can't register pressure applied by the pen; tilting of the pen; and can't distinguish between a capacitive stylus, a finger, or a resting palm as input - it will register all of these touches on the screen.

Capacitive styluses are made of a conductive material (typically as a metal rod or barrel) to transmit electrical charge between the hand and a rubber or metal tip such as copper. Being free of any digital components, capacitive styluses can be cost effective to manufacture. DIY capacitive styluses can also be made with materials found at home.

Capacitive screens are very widely used on smartphones and multi-touch surfaces, where simultaneous use of several fingers is detected. Capacitive styluses tend to work on any multi-touch surface that accepts input from a finger.

=== Active ===
Active (also called digital) styluses include digital components or circuitry inside the pen that communicates with a digitizer on the touch device. This communication allows for advanced features such as pressure sensitivity, tilt, programmable buttons, palm detection, eraser tips, memorizing settings, and writing data transmission. In order for an active stylus to function, its digital component protocol must match the digitizer technology it is interacting with. Active styluses are powered by a removable or chargeable battery, or operate passively by inductance.

Active styluses use different protocols by different manufacturers in order to communicate with the digitizer of a graphic tablet or multi-touch device. The digital protocol of the pen must match the device digitizer, otherwise input from the pen will not register on the device.

=== Resistive ===
A resistive stylus works by applying pressure to the screen, causing two layers (a conductive and a resistive layer) to make contact. This registers as a touch input.

== Gallery ==
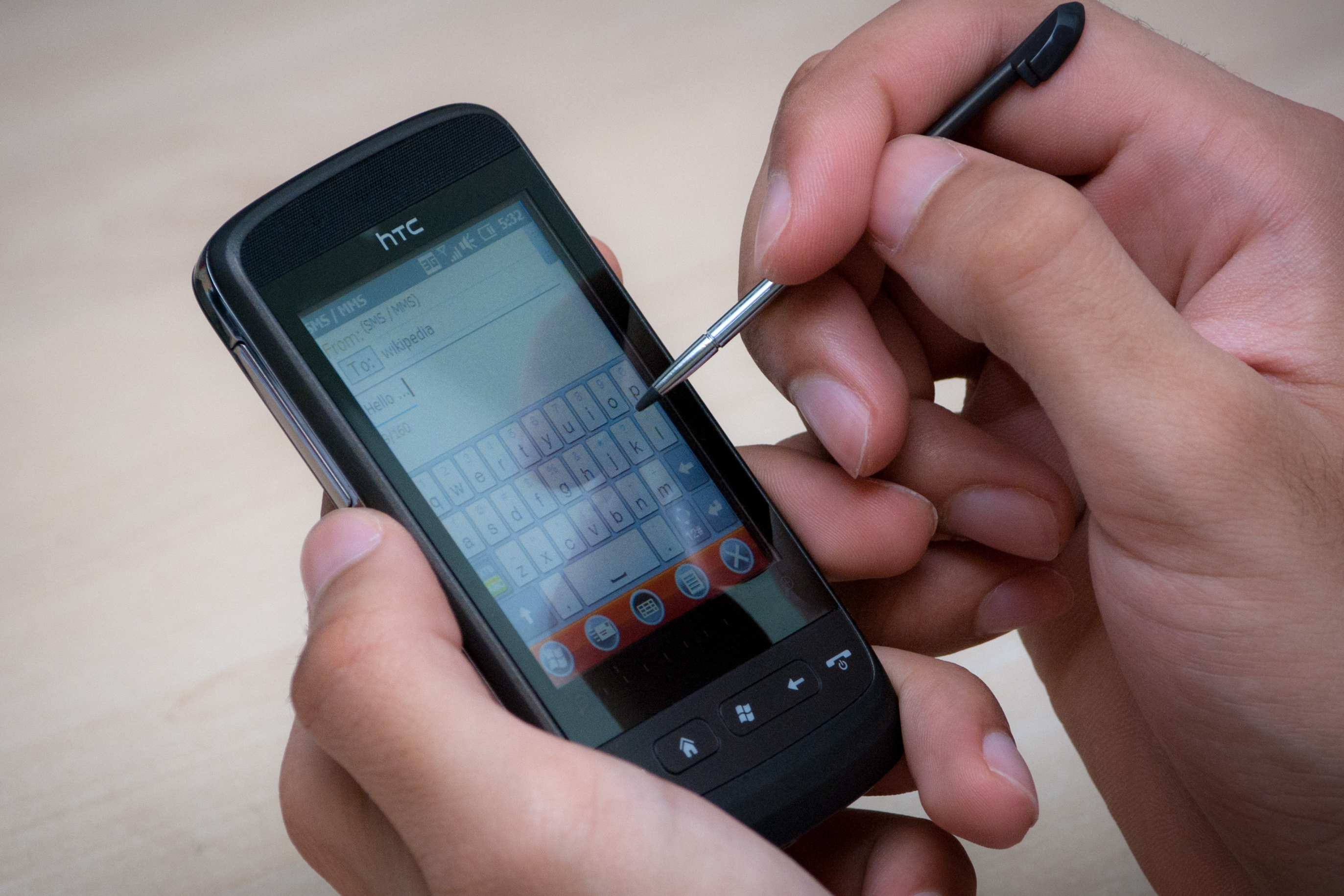
A smartphone being operated with a stylus

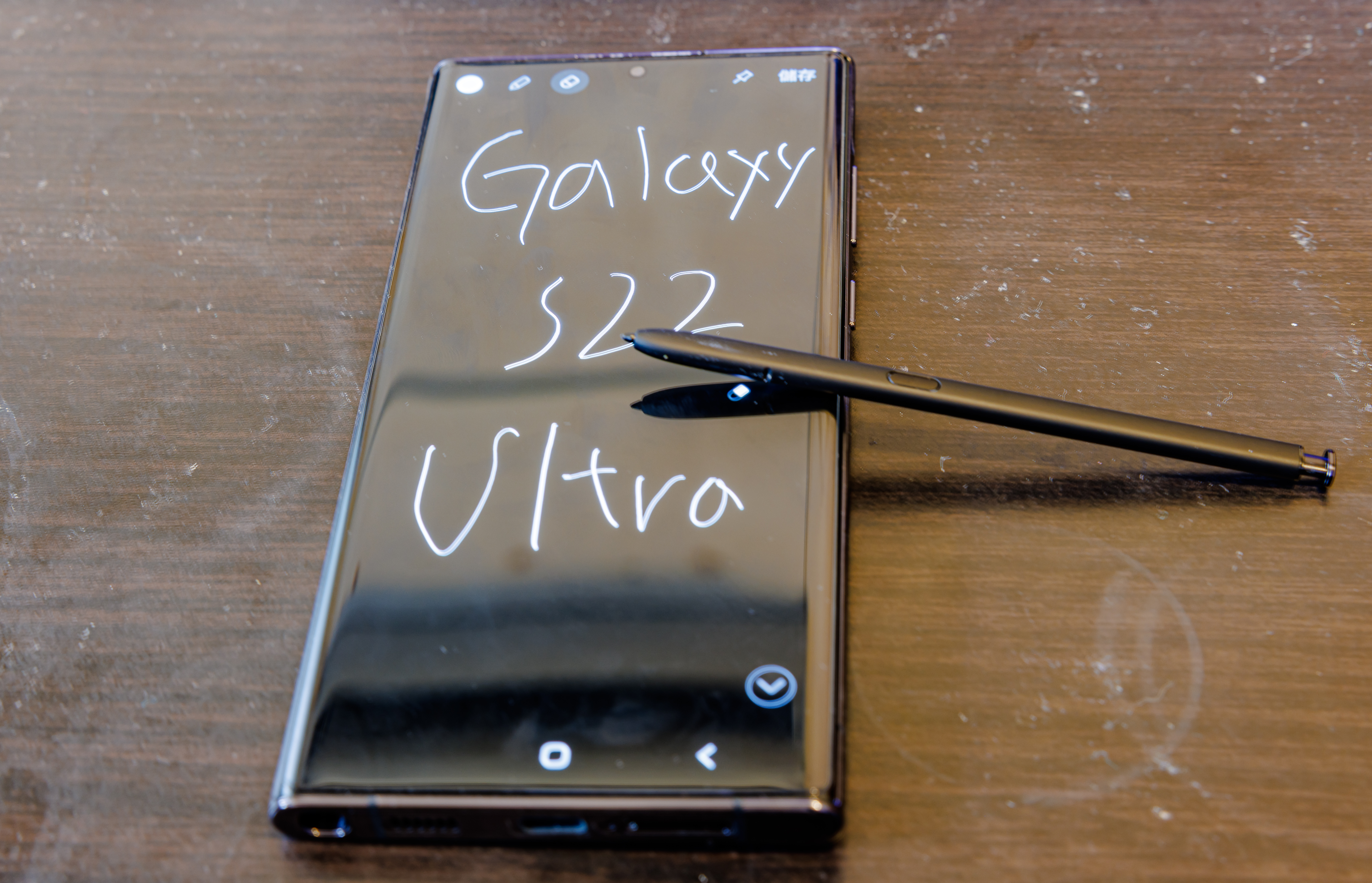
Samsung Galaxy Note series of smartphones, as well as the "Ultra" models of the S series since S22 Ultra, come with an integrated stylus called S Pen.

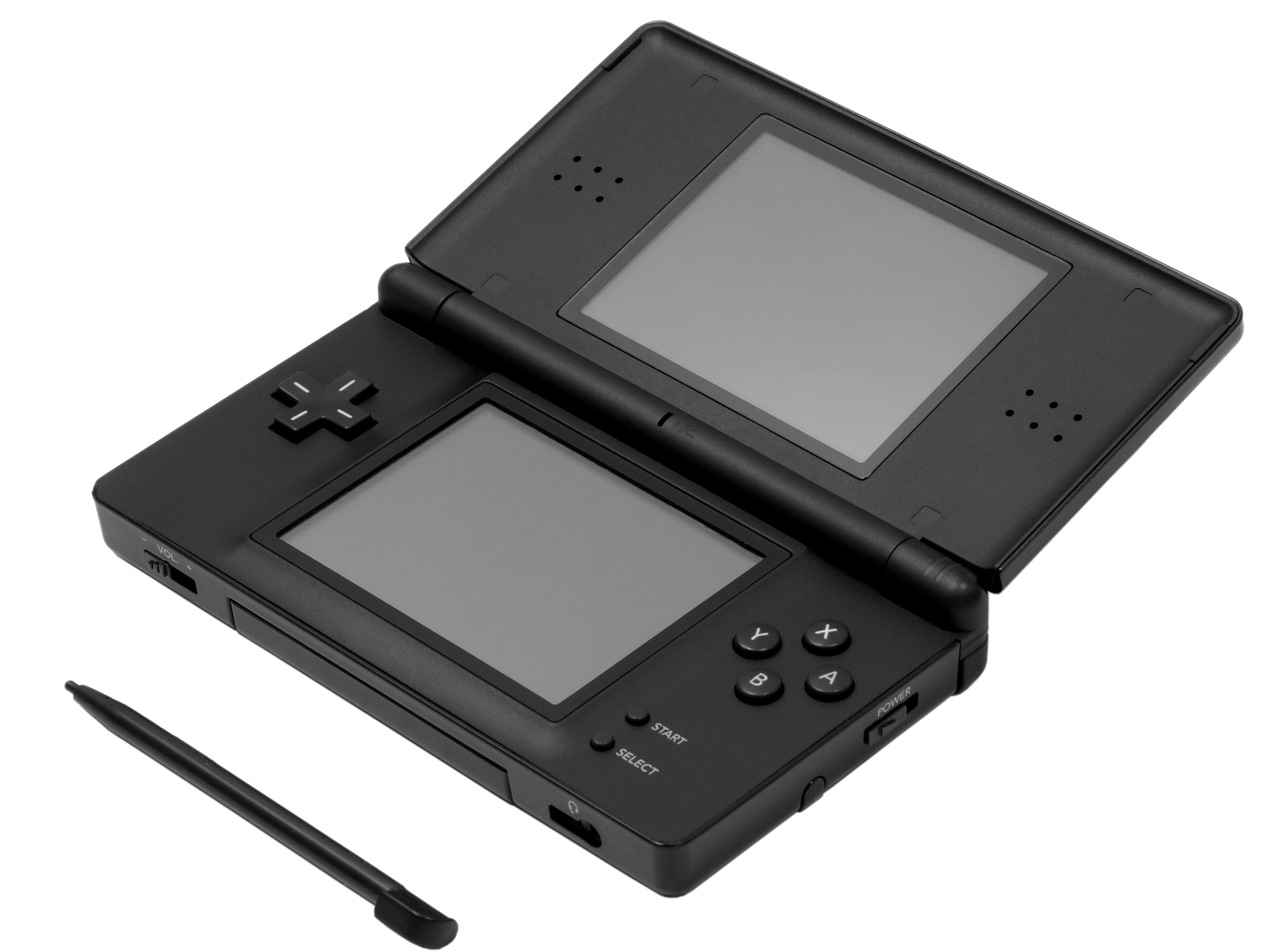
A Nintendo DS Lite with its stylus

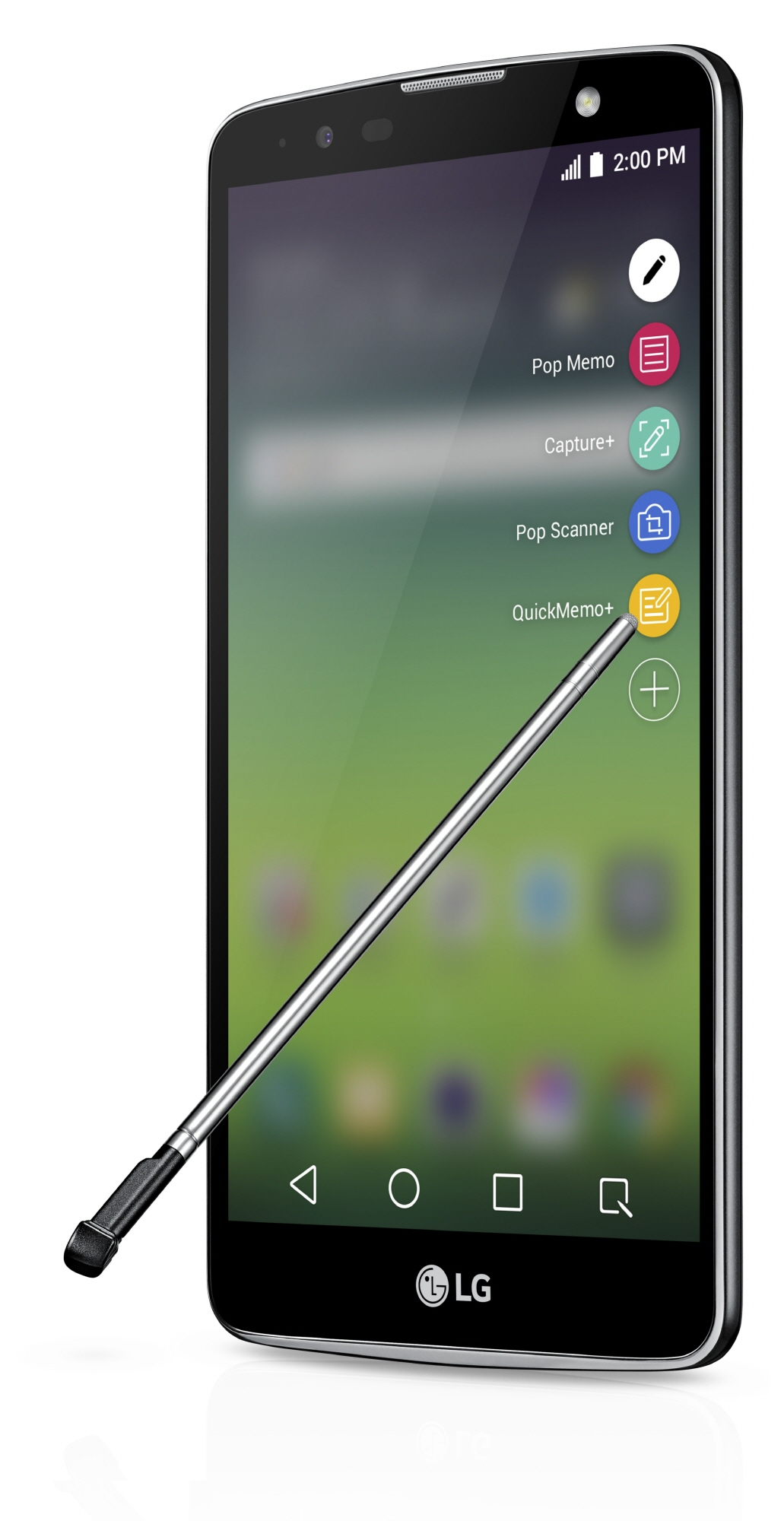
An LG Stylo 2 Plus smartphone, with its integrated stylus

== See also ==
- Active pen
- Digital pen
- Pen computing
- Handwriting recognition
