= Wacom =

Japanese company specializing in graphics tablets and related products

Wacom Co., Ltd.

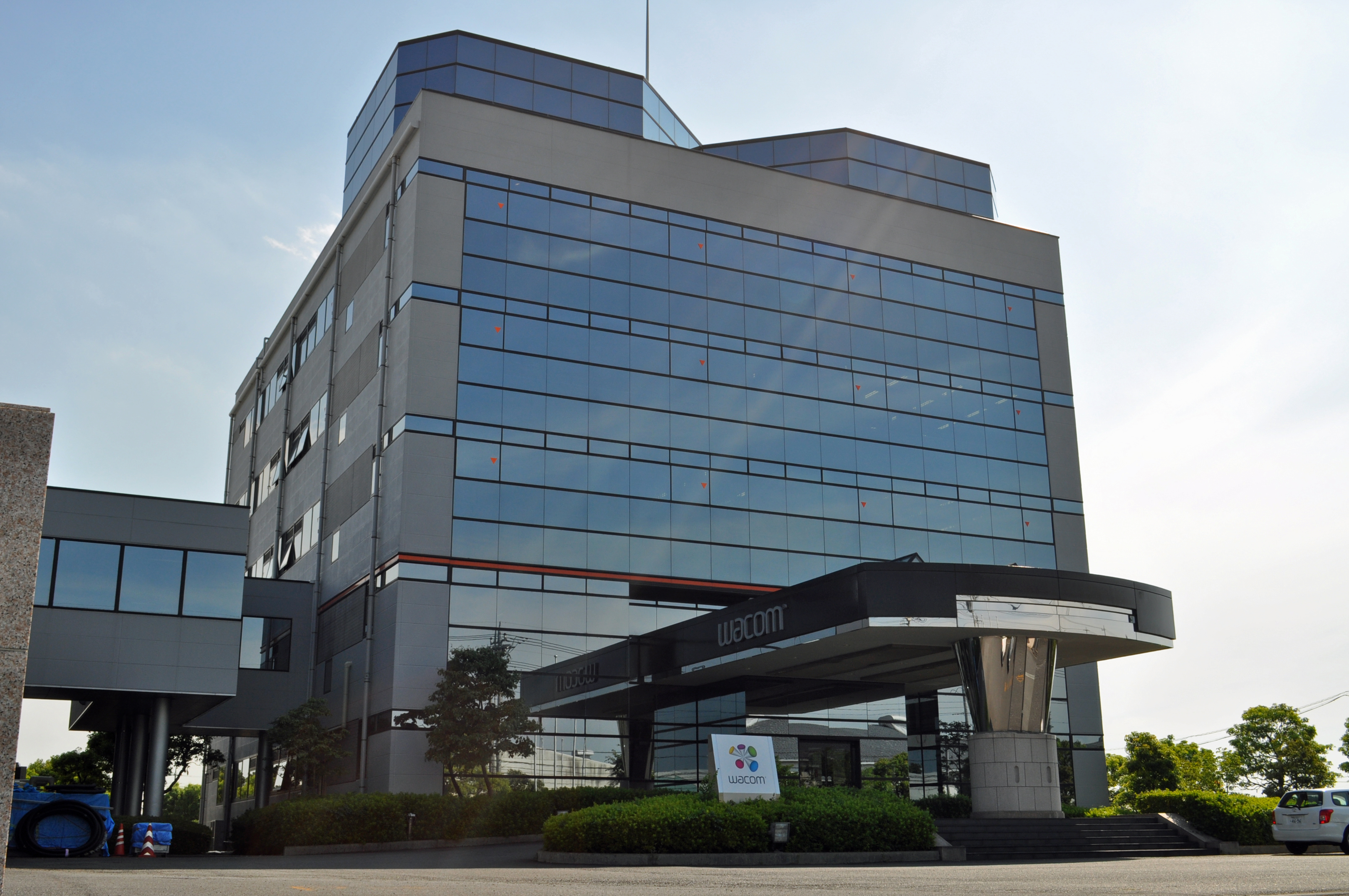
- Headquarters in Kazo, Saitama, Japan
- Native name: 株式会社ワコム
- Romanized name: Kabushiki gaisha Wakomu
- Type: Public
- Traded as: TYO: 6727
- Industry: Computer input devices and software
- Founded: 1983 in Ageo, Saitama, Japan
- Headquarters: Kazo, Saitama, Japan
- Area served: Worldwide
- Key people: Nobutaka (Nobu) Ide (president & CEO)
- Products: Bamboo, Intuos, Cintiq, MobileStudio Pro, PenPartner, Volito, Graphire
- Revenue: ▲¥109 billion (2022)
- Operating income: ▼¥13 billion (2022)
- Net income: ▲¥11 billion (2022)
- Total assets: ▲¥73 billion (2022)
- Number of employees: 1,069 (2022)
- Website: wacom.com

Wacom Co., Ltd. (株式会社ワコム, Kabushiki gaisha Wakomu; /ˈwɑːkəm/) is a Japanese company headquartered in Kazo, Saitama, Japan, that specializes in manufacturing graphics tablets and related products. As of 2012 Wacom generated sales of approximately 40.7 billion yen with 785 employees. Wacom also has major offices in Dusseldorf, Germany and Vancouver, Washington. The company's shares are listed on the Tokyo Stock Exchange.

== History ==
The company was founded in 1983 by Azuma Murakami. Dissatisfied by a corded digitizer on the photo typesetting machine he used while working at the Unification Church affiliated newspaper Sekai Nippo, Murakami fabricated a cordless digitizer on his own time and brought it to market. Murakami was later forced out of his role in July 1997 following an internal power struggle over church ties.

The name Wacom came from an abbreviated variation of World Computer (Japanese: ワールドコンピュータ, wārudo konpyūtā), with the syllable "wa" (和, Japanese for "harmony").

Wacom demonstrated a hand-drawing system at SIGGRAPH in 1987. Walt Disney Animation Studios became an early major customer, using the company's tablets on The Rescuers Down Under and Beauty and the Beast (1991).

Wacom was the first company to make pens without a cord, which it introduced in 1991; it released its first pen display the following year. Its products were initially targeted at professional artists, but by the late 1990s it aimed to expand to home users as well.

In 1996, U.S. president Bill Clinton used a Wacom pen to sign the Telecommunications Act of 1996.

In 2001, the company partnered with Sony to introduce a Vaio laptop with built-in touch functionality.

The company was listed on JASDAQ in 2003. For the fiscal year ending in 2004 it reported sales of ¥17.6 billion, about 70 percent of it from outside Japan, and employed some 450 people.

Microsoft used Wacom digitizers in the first two generations of its Surface Pro tablets but switched to the competing N-trig system with the Surface Pro 3 in 2014, and acquired N-trig the following year.

== Corporate affairs ==
=== Shareholder activism ===
The British investment manager Asset Value Investors (AVI) has been Wacom's largest shareholder since August 2021, and held about 13.7 percent of the company in May 2026. Ahead of the 2025 annual general meeting AVI submitted proposals to create a committee supervising the company's transformation plan, to appoint an outside director with capital-markets experience, and to amend the articles of incorporation in line with the METI guidelines on corporate takeovers, citing cumulative losses of more than ¥10 billion in the branded products segment. The proposals drew about 30 percent shareholder support.

In May 2026 AVI submitted a second set of proposals, seeking the dismissal of chief executive Nobutaka Ide and of the chief operating officer, and the appointment of an outside director. The fund objected to Wacom's acquisition, for about ¥1.7 billion, of a loss-making startup previously headed by the officer concerned, and alleged that office space at the company's Tokyo premises had been used by Ide's daughter to record dance videos. Wacom's board resolved on May 13 to oppose both proposals, describing the criticism as misdirected: it said the space was covered by a facility-use agreement priced with outside expert advice, and that the acquisition had been reviewed over three months by a special committee of outside directors.

Shareholders rejected the proposals at the annual general meeting on June 25, 2026. Ide's re-election was approved with 64.30 percent of votes cast, while the proposal to dismiss him received 24.61 percent.

=== Litigation ===
In 2024, Wacom filed a patent infringement suit in a United States court against Maxeye, a Chinese manufacturer of digital pens.

== Products ==
Wacom produces two categories of graphics tablets: those with a screen ('pen display') and those without ('tablet'). In addition, the company provides software for computers and software to interpret pen data. Some pens have an eraser on the rear end.

=== Cintiq ===
Wacom's professional pen displays are under the Cintiq line. They allow for drawing directly on the screen, like drawing on paper, and are more expensive than other Wacom products. The Cintiq Companion is a portable variant of the Cintiq displays.

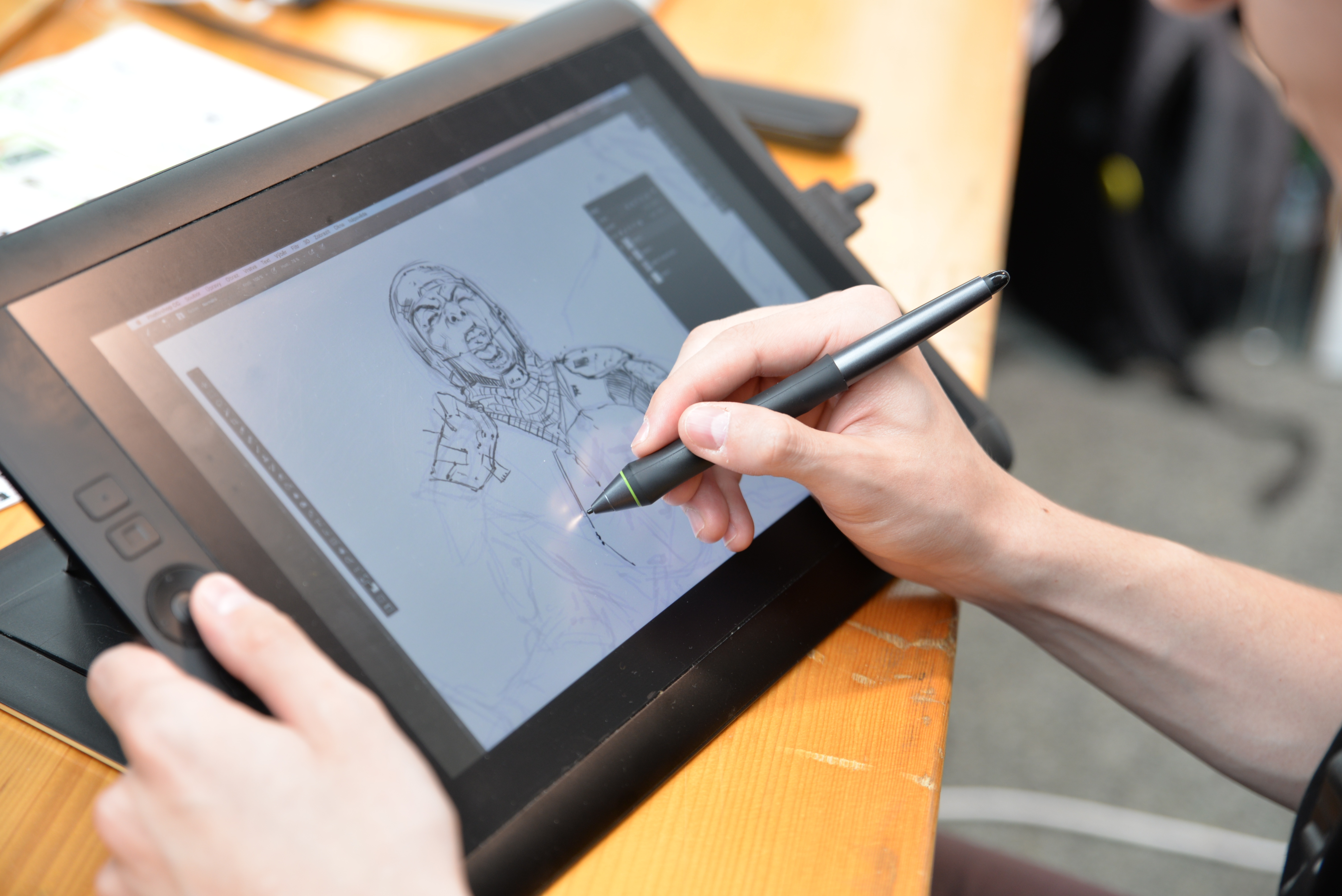
A person drawing on a Cintiq tablet

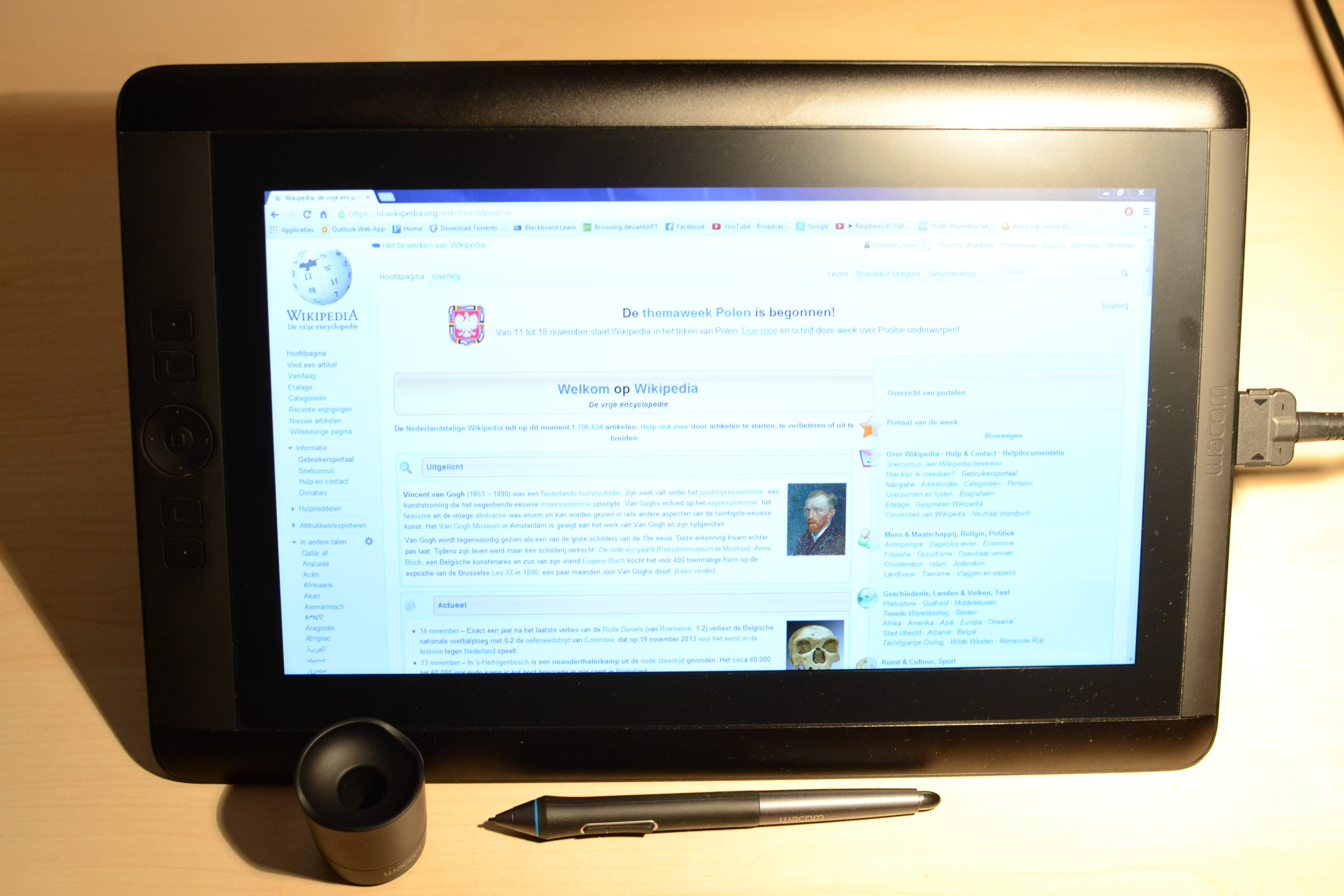
A Wacom Cintiq 13HD

=== Intuos ===
Small Intuos drawing with pen tablet from Wacom (Model: CTL4100)

Intuos graphics tablets do not have displays. The first version was introduced in 1999, replacing the earlier ArtZ line. It is available in an entry-level version and the more advanced Intuos Pro. In 2018, The Verge called the entry-level models a "great introduction to digital art". The Intuos Pro was redesigned in 2025, moving the ExpressKeys from the side of the tablet to its top edge and replacing the touch ring with dials.

=== One ===
The One series of products is targeted at beginners, and features versions both with and without screens. The One tablet, released at CES 2020, has a 13-inch, 1920x1080 display. The Verge labeled it as Wacom's "most affordable tablet to date", being priced at $400.

=== Movink ===
In April 2024 Wacom introduced the Movink 13, a 13.3-inch pen display and the company's first to use an OLED panel; at four millimetres thick it was also its thinnest and lightest pen display.

In July 2025 the line was extended with the MovinkPad 11, an 11.45-inch Android tablet that runs drawing software on its own rather than requiring a connected computer.

=== Other products ===
Wacom also makes the MobileStudio, a pen display with an inbuilt computer.

They have also made other lines of graphics tablets, such as the Bamboo and Graphire, which were both screenless. In 2011, the company released a tablet-less pen, which allowed for drawing on any piece of paper, but was criticized for being inaccurate compared to a normal photo scan. In 2018, it partnered with Magic Leap to create collaborative mixed reality design tools at CES.

== Technology ==
The tablets use electromagnetic resonance (EMR) technology, a type of faint radio signal. Magnetic waves are emitted from the tablet, which are then transmitted to the pen and stored. When the pen is released, the waves are sent back to the tablet, which uses it to determine the pen's position; this avoids the usage of separate batteries in the pen. The pen also contains a movable tip, which allows determining the pressure applied to the tablet.

== Recognition ==
At the 53rd Annie Awards in February 2026, Wacom received the Ub Iwerks Award, which recognises technical advances with a lasting effect on animation, for the adoption of its pen technology in animation production.

== Criticism ==
The company has received criticism for collection of user data, which Wacom says is "for quality assurance and development purposes", where the data is anonymized.

In early 2024, the company was criticised by artists for using AI-generated images in its advertising material. The company replied in a post on its blogs on January 9, stating that "using AI generated images in these assets was not our intent" and that the images came from a third-party vendor.
