= Surface Mini =

Unreleased tablet computer by Microsoft

- Developer: Microsoft
- Product family: Microsoft Surface
- Type: Tablet computer
- Released: Unreleased
- Operating system: Windows RT 8.1
- System on a chip: Qualcomm Snapdragon 800
- Memory: 1 GB RAM
- Storage: 32 GB flash memory
- Removable storage: microSD
- Display: 1440 × 1080 px 240 PPI 4:3 aspect ratio 7.5 in (190 mm) diagonal
- Sound: Bluetooth, speaker, microphone, headset jack
- Input: Multi-touch screen
- Camera: 2.1 MP front 5 MP rear
- Connectivity: Wi-Fi 802.11 a/b/g/n Bluetooth 4.0
- Power: Built-in rechargeable Li-Ion battery
- Online services: Windows Store, Xbox Music, Xbox Video
- Dimensions: 8 in (200 mm) (h); 5.5 in (140 mm) (w); 0.35 in (8.9 mm) (d)
- Weight: 0.8 lb (360 g)
- Related: Surface Pro 3 Surface 3

The Surface Mini is an unreleased tablet computer that Microsoft designed as the successor to the Surface 2 in the Microsoft Surface family. The device has a Qualcomm Snapdragon 800 processor and a 7.5-inch (19 cm) 4:3 aspect ratio touchscreen display that defaults to portrait mode. Like its predecessor, the Surface Mini runs Windows RT 8.1, a mobile operating system that was designed for the ARM architecture and has limitations including an inability to install Win32 applications; programs can only be installed from the Windows Store.

Rumors of the development of a seven-inch tablet computer were reported in April 2013 when Microsoft was preparing to develop a device in response to competitors' tablet computers with a similar form factor, including Apple's iPad Mini and Google's Nexus 7. The Surface Mini's release date was postponed from 2013 to 2014, and was canceled several weeks before the Surface event in 2014. The existence of the cancelled device was later revealed by Panos Panay during an October 2015 interview with Wired Magazine. Despite its cancellation, Windows Central obtained the unreleased device and published its specifications and images of the tablet.

== History ==
In April 2013, Wall Street Journal reported rumors of the development of seven-inch (18 cm) tablet computer by Microsoft, which was preparing a new lineup of Surface tablet computers that included the unnamed seven-inch tablet, in response to competitor's products in this form factor including Apple's iPad Mini and Google's Nexus 7. The upcoming Surface RT mini-tablet computer was to be equipped with a Qualcomm Snapdragon 800 processor, which replaced the Nvidia Tegra 3 processor that was used in first generation of Surface RT tablets. The inclusion of Snapdragon 800 processor added LTE connectivity, which allows the device to be equipped with mobile broadband, which Mike Angiulo, Microsoft's chief of ecosystem and planning, hinted at as a possibility of future connected devices in early 2013.

During the Build developer conference in 2013, Microsoft revealed the tools that allow development of applications designed for devices with 7-and-7.5-inch (18 and 19 cm) displays, which suggested Microsoft was expecting original equipment manufacturers (OEMs) to offer devices with these screen sizes. Despite it not being shown during Microsoft's Surface event in 2013, rumors of the Surface Mini tablet persist into September; according to these rumors, its display screen-size had increased to seven and a half inches, a screen size that PC manufacturers did not widely adopt. The rumored device's screen aspect ratio was also switched from 16:9 to 4:3 for easier to use in portrait mode.

According to Mary Jo Foley of ZDNet, Microsoft postponed the release of the Surface Mini to 2014 because it was focusing on development of the Windows 8.1 Update, which was released on April 8, 2014. When The Verge asked Microsoft's chief product officer Panos Panay about the possibility of a mini tablet computer for its Surface line, he refused to answer but hinted at the possibility of multiple form factors and screen sizes in its future Surface line.

=== Cancellation ===
While several media including The Verge and Engadget anticipated the device would be announced at the 2014 Surface event, according to Bloomberg, Microsoft had canceled the product a few weeks before the event. The Surface Mini tablet was not revealed during the 2014 Surface event; the Surface Pro 3 was shown instead.

Several signs of the Surface Mini's existence include mentions of the device in the Surface Pro 3 user manual and Microsoft's earnings reports in 2014. On October 26, 2015, during an interview with Panos Panay in Wired Magazine, Panos showed off the Surface Book and the canceled Surface Mini, saying he loved the tablet his team built but never shipped officially. He also stated the device's design felt like that of a Moleskine notebook.

Despite the cancellation of Surface Mini, Windows Central obtained the unreleased device and published several images of it in June 2017. Windows Central published its review of the Surface Mini in October 2019, and gave a favorable review, awarding it four stars out of five and saying it would be better if the Surface Mini was updated with better specs and equipped with Windows 10. Windows Central said the Surface Mini was canceled because devices running Windows RT were excluded from upgrading to Windows 10 and because Windows 10 for ARM was unavailable at that time.

== Features ==
=== Software ===
The Surface Mini shipped with Windows RT 8.1, a mobile operating system that unlike Windows 8.1, on which it is based, has several limitations. Windows RT 8.1 includes Microsoft Office 2013 RT, a desktop application that is optimized for ARM systems. Windows Store apps are the only third-party applications that can be installed on Windows RT 8.1. Despite providing the traditional Windows desktop environment, users cannot install Win32 applications or applications optimized for ARM. Windows RT 8.1 excludes Windows Media Player in favor of multimedia apps found on the Windows Store; devices are pre-loaded with the in-house Xbox Music and Xbox Video apps.

There is no upgrade path for Surface Mini to run Windows 10; hence, the device remains running Windows RT until the end of support on January 10, 2023.

=== Hardware ===
The exterior of the Surface Mini is a combination of metal, glass and polyurethane materials. The outer shell is made from polyurethane materials, which are scratch resistant. It would have been supplied with a kickstand that was limited to three positions and was also released with the Surface 3. There is a built-in pen loop would have allowed users to attach the Surface Pen stylus into the device when not in use, and could also be used to open the kickstand. Metal was used for the volume button, power button, headphone jack, Micro USB port and microSD card slot. The weight of the Surface Mini is 0.8 lb (360 g), and it measured 8x5.5x0.35 in (215.9×139.7×8.89 mm).

The Surface Mini has a Qualcomm Snapdragon 800 processor and 1 GB of random access memory. There are three physical switches: a power button, a volume control, and a Start menu button. The Surface Mini's touchscreen display measures 7.5 inches (19 cm), with a 1440-by-1080-pixel resolution, 4:3 aspect ratio, and a pixel density of 240 ppi. The default orientation for the device is portrait; the Start Menu button is placed at the bottom of the screen, although the device supports screen rotation in all four orientations. The device is equipped with 32 GB of solid-state storage for programs and data, which can be increased using a micro SD card. The device supports Wi-Fi 802.11a/b/g/n and Bluetooth 4.0, and has a front-facing 2.1 MP camera and a rear-facing 5 MP camera.
