= Windows RT =

2012 device-oriented operating system from Microsoft

- Version of the Windows NT operating system

- Screenshot of Windows RT 8.1 Update 3 running on a Surface RT, showing Start menu and system specifications
- Developer: Microsoft
- Released to manufacturing: October 26, 2012; 14 years ago
- Final release: 6.3.9600 Update 3 (Windows RT 8.1 Update 3) / January 10, 2023; 3 years ago
- Supported platforms: ARMv7
- Kernel type: Hybrid (Windows NT)
- Preceded by: Windows CE
- Succeeded by: Windows 10 S; Windows 10 (ARM64), version 1709
- Official website: windows.microsoft.com/en-us/windows/rt-welcome

Support status
- Windows RT (8.0) is unsupported as of January 12, 2016. Customers had to update to Windows RT 8.1 to continue to receive support.; Mainstream support for Windows RT 8.1 ended on January 9, 2018; Extended support for Windows RT 8.1 ended on January 10, 2023

Windows RT is a mobile operating system developed by Microsoft and released alongside Windows 8 on October 26, 2012. It is a version of Windows 8 or Windows 8.1 built for the 32-bit ARM architecture (ARMv7), designed to take advantage of the architecture's power efficiency to allow for longer battery life, to use system-on-chip (SoC) designs to allow for thinner devices and to provide a "reliable" experience over time. Unlike Windows 8, Windows RT was only available as preloaded software on devices specifically designed for the operating system by original equipment manufacturers (OEMs); Microsoft launched its own hardware running it, the Surface tablet, which was followed by Surface 2, although only five models running Windows RT were released by third-party OEMs throughout its lifetime.

In comparison to other mobile operating systems, Windows RT also supported a relatively large number of existing USB peripherals and accessories and includes a version of Microsoft Office 2013 optimized for ARM devices as pre-loaded software. Some limitations it had compared to Windows 8 were that it could only execute software digitally signed by Microsoft, lacked certain developer-oriented features, and could not run applications designed for x86 processors, which were the main platform for Windows at the time. Windows RT 8.1 was released in 2013 as a free upgrade, featuring a number of improvements.

It received mixed reviews at launch, while critics and analysts deemed it to be commercially unsuccessful. It was criticized for its poor software ecosystem, citing the early stage of Windows Store and its incompatibility with existing Windows software. Some felt Windows RT devices had advantages over other mobile platforms (such as Android, iOS, and Microsoft's Windows Phone) because of its bundled software, and the ability to use a wider variety of USB peripherals and accessories.

Improvements to Intel's mobile processors, along with a decision by Microsoft to remove OEM license fees for Windows on devices with screens smaller than 9 inches, spurred a market for low-end Wintel tablets running the full Windows 8 platform, giving battery life and functionality that met or exceeded that of Windows RT devices; these effectively cannibalized Windows RT sales, and was a reason why Microsoft suffered a US$900 million loss in July 2013. With the release of Surface 3 in 2015, the Surface line switched to Intel processors. In 2018, Microsoft would partner with Qualcomm on launching an ARM version of Windows 10; unlike Windows RT, the OS would support running x86 software via emulation.

== History ==
At the 2011 Consumer Electronics Show, it was officially announced that the next version of Windows would provide support for system-on-chip (SoC) implementations based on the ARM architecture. Steven Sinofsky, then Windows division president, demonstrated an early version of a Windows port for the architecture, codenamed Windows on ARM (WoA), running on prototypes with Qualcomm Snapdragon, Texas Instruments OMAP, and Nvidia Tegra 2 chips. The prototypes featured working versions of Internet Explorer 9 (with DirectX support via the Tegra 2's GPU), PowerPoint and Word, along with the use of class drivers to allow printing to an Epson printer. Sinofsky felt that the shift towards SoC designs were "a natural evolution of hardware that's applicable to a wide range of form factors, not just to slates", while Microsoft CEO Steve Ballmer emphasized the importance of supporting SoCs on Windows by proclaiming that the operating system would "be everywhere on every kind of device without compromise."

Initial development on WoA took place by porting code from Windows 7; Windows Mobile smartphones were used to test early builds of WoA because of lack of readily available ARM-based tablets. Later testing was performed using a custom-designed array of rack-mounted ARM-based systems. Changes to the Windows codebase were made to optimize the OS for the internal hardware of ARM devices, but a number of technical standards traditionally used by x86 systems are also used. WoA devices would use UEFI firmware and have a software-based Trusted Platform Module to support device encryption and UEFI Secure Boot. ACPI is also used to detect and control plug and play devices and provide power management outside the SoC. To enable wider hardware support, peripherals such as human interface devices, storage and other components that use USB and I²C connections use class drivers and standardized protocols. Windows Update serves as the mechanism for updating all system drivers, software, and firmware.

Microsoft showcased other aspects of the new operating system, to be known as Windows 8, during subsequent presentations. Among these changes (which also included an overhauled interface optimized for use on touch-based devices built around Metro design language) was the introduction of Windows Runtime (WinRT). Software developed using this new architecture could be processor-independent (allowing compatibility with both x86- and ARM-based systems), would emphasize the use of touch input, would run within a sandboxed environment to provide additional security, and be distributed through Windows Store—a store similar to services such as the App Store and Google Play. WinRT was also optimized to provide a more "reliable" experience on ARM-based devices; as such, backward compatibility for Win32 software otherwise compatible with older versions of Windows was intentionally excluded from Windows on ARM. Windows developers indicated that existing Windows applications were not specifically optimized for reliability and energy efficiency on the ARM architecture and that WinRT was sufficient for providing "full expressive power" for applications, "while avoiding the traps and pitfalls that can potentially reduce the overall experience for consumers." Consequentially, this lack of backward compatibility would also prevent existing malware from running on the operating system.

On April 16, 2012, Microsoft announced that Windows on ARM would be officially branded as Windows RT. Microsoft did not explicitly indicate what the "RT" in the operating system's name referred to, but it was believed to refer to the WinRT architecture. Steven Sinofsky stated that Microsoft would ensure the differences between Windows RT and 8 were adequately addressed in advertising. However, reports found that promotional web pages for the Microsoft Surface tablet had contained confusing wording alluding to the compatibility differences and that Microsoft Store representatives were providing inconsistent and sometimes incorrect information about Windows RT. In response, Microsoft stated that Microsoft Store staff members would be given an average of 15 hours of training prior to the launch of Windows 8 and Windows RT to ensure that consumers were able to make the correct choice for their needs. The first Windows RT devices were officially released alongside Windows 8 on October 26, 2012.

Windows 8.1, an upgrade for Windows 8 and RT, was released in Windows Store on October 17, 2013, containing a number of improvements to the operating system's interface and functionality. For Windows RT devices, the update also adds Outlook to the included Office RT suite. The update was temporarily recalled by Microsoft shortly after its release, following reports that some Surface users had encountered a rare bug which corrupted their device's Boot Configuration Data during installation, resulting in an error on startup. On October 21, 2013, Microsoft released recovery media and instructions which could be used to repair the device and restored access to Windows 8.1 the next day.

== Comparison to Windows 8 ==
While Windows RT functions similarly to Windows 8, there are still some notable differences, primarily involving software and hardware compatibility. Julie Larson-Green, then executive vice president of the Devices and Studios group at Microsoft, explained that Windows RT was ultimately designed to provide a "closed, turnkey" user experience, "where it doesn't have all the flexibility of Windows, but it has the power of Office and then all the new style applications. So you could give it to your kid and he's not going to load it up with a bunch of toolbars accidentally out of Internet Explorer and then come to you later and say, 'why am I getting all these pop-ups?' It just isn't capable of doing that by design."

=== Included software ===
Windows RT does not include Windows Media Player, in favor of other multimedia apps found on Windows Store; devices are pre-loaded with the in-house Xbox Music and Xbox Video apps.

All Windows RT devices include Office 2013 Home & Student RT—a version of Microsoft Office that is optimized for ARM systems. As the version of Office RT included on Windows RT devices is based on the Home & Student version, it cannot be used for "commercial, nonprofit, or revenue-generating activities" unless the organization has a volume license for Office 2013, or the user has an Office 365 subscription with commercial use rights. For compatibility and security reasons, certain advanced features, such as Visual Basic macros, are not available in Office RT.

Windows RT also includes a BitLocker-based device encryption system, which passively encrypts a user's data once they sign in with a Microsoft account.

=== Software compatibility ===
Due to the different architecture of ARM-based devices compared to x86 devices, Windows RT has software compatibility limitations. Although the operating system still provides the traditional Windows desktop environment alongside Windows 8's touch-oriented user interface, the only desktop applications officially supported by Windows RT are those that come with the operating system itself; such as File Explorer, Internet Explorer, and Office RT. Only Windows Store apps can be installed by users on Windows RT devices; they must be obtained from Windows Store or sideloaded in enterprise environments. Developers cannot port desktop applications to run on Windows RT since Microsoft developers felt that they would not be properly optimized for the platform. As a consequence, Windows RT also does not support "new-experience enabled" web browsers: a special class of app used on Windows 8 that allows web browsers to bundle variants that can run in the Windows RT "modern-style user interface" and integrate with other apps but still use Win32 code like desktop programs.

=== Hardware compatibility ===
In a presentation at Windows 8's launch event in New York City, Steven Sinofsky claimed that Windows RT would support 420 million existing hardware devices and peripherals. However, in comparison to Windows 8, full functionality will not be available for all devices, and some devices will not be supported at all. Microsoft provides a "Compatibility Center" portal where users can search for compatibility information on devices with Windows RT; on launch, the site listed just over 30,000 devices that were compatible with the operating system.

=== Networking and device management ===
While Windows RT devices can join a HomeGroup and access files stored within shared folders and libraries on other devices within the group, files cannot be shared from the Windows RT device itself. Windows RT does not support connecting to a domain for network logins, nor does it support using Group Policy for device management. However, Exchange ActiveSync, the Windows Intune service, or System Center Configuration Manager 2012 SP1 can be used to provide some control over Windows RT devices in enterprise environments, such as the ability to apply security policies and provide a portal which can be used to sideload apps from outside Windows Store.

=== User interface ===
After installation of the KB3033055 update for Windows RT 8.1, a desktop Start menu becomes available as an alternative to the Start screen. It is divided into two columns, with one devoted to recent and pinned applications, and one devoted to live tiles. It is similar to, but not identical to, Windows 10's version.

=== Support lifecycle ===
Windows RT follows the lifecycle policy of Windows 8 and Windows 8.1. The original Surface tablet fell under Microsoft's support policies for consumer hardware and received mainstream support until April 11, 2017.

Mainstream support for Windows RT (8.0) ended on January 12, 2016. Users must have updated to Windows RT 8.1 which continued receiving support until the dates mentioned below.

Mainstream support for Windows RT 8.1 ended on January 9, 2018, and extended support for Windows RT 8.1 ended on January 10, 2023.

== Devices ==
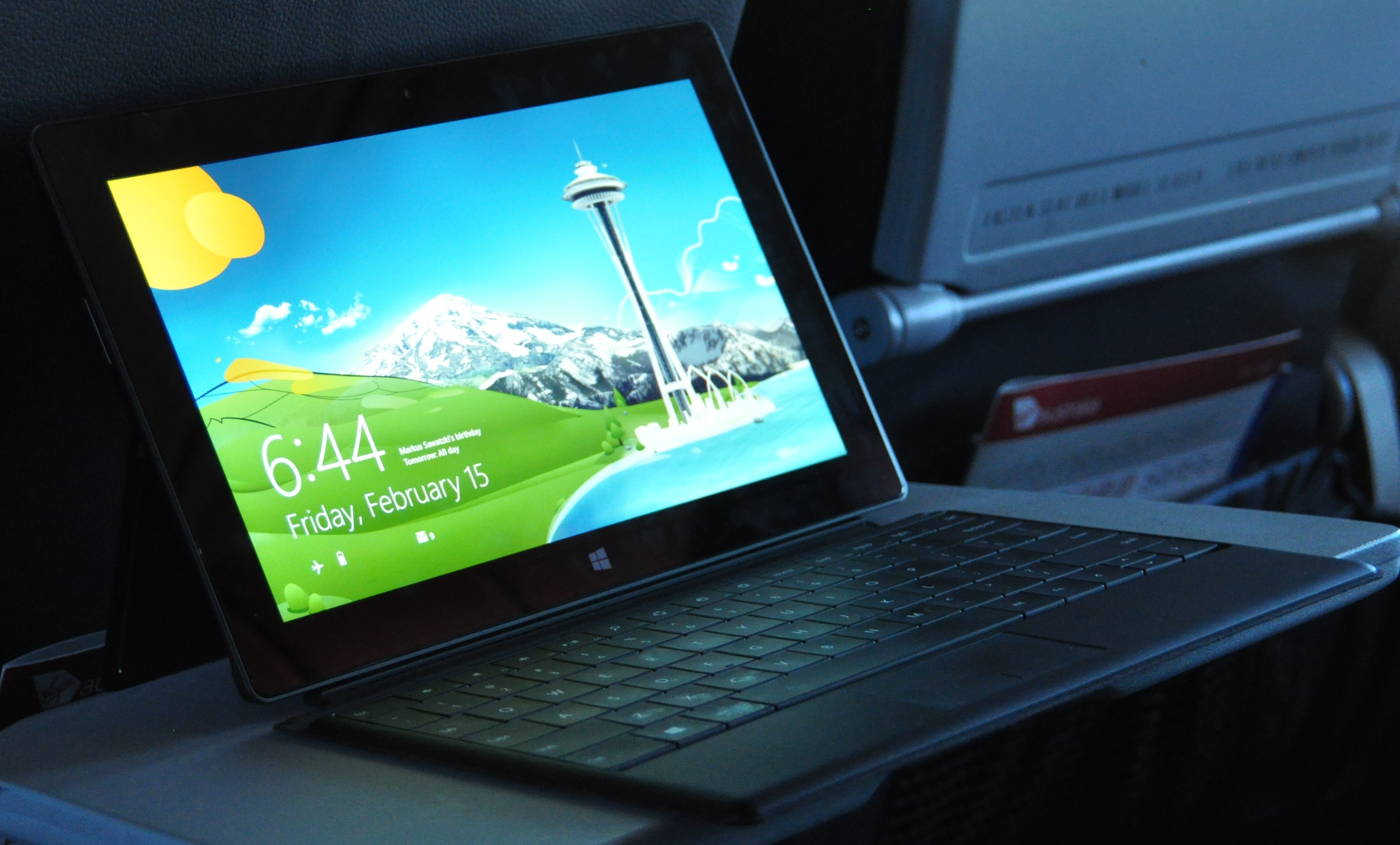
Microsoft Surface was created as a first-party device for Windows RT.

Microsoft imposed tight control on the development and production of Windows RT devices: they were designed in cooperation with the company, and built to strict design and hardware specifications, including requirements to only use "approved" models of certain components. To ensure hardware quality and control the number of devices released upon launch, the three participating ARM chip makers were only allowed to partner with up to two PC manufacturers to develop the first "wave" of Windows RT devices in Microsoft's development program. Qualcomm partnered with Samsung and HP, Nvidia with Asus and Lenovo, and Texas Instruments with Toshiba. Additionally, Microsoft partnered with Nvidia to produce Surface (retroactively renamed "Surface RT") – the first Windows-based computing device to be manufactured and marketed directly by Microsoft. Windows RT was designed to support chips meeting the ARMv7 architecture, a 32-bit processor platform. Shortly after the original release of Windows RT, ARM Holdings disclosed that it was working with Microsoft and other software partners on supporting 64-bit AArch64.

Multiple hardware partners pulled out of the program during the development of Windows RT, the first being Toshiba and Texas Instruments. TI later announced that it was pulling out of the consumer market for ARM system-on-chips to focus on embedded systems. HP also pulled out of the program, believing that Intel-based tablets were more appropriate for business use than ARM. HP was replaced by Dell as an alternate Qualcomm partner. Acer also intended to release a Windows RT device alongside its Windows 8-based products, but initially decided to delay it until the second quarter of 2013 in response to the mixed reaction to Surface. The unveiling of the Microsoft-developed tablet caught Acer by surprise, leading to concerns that Surface could leave "a huge negative impact for the Windows ecosystem and other brands."

=== First-generation devices ===
The first wave of Windows RT devices included:

- Microsoft Surface (released October 26, 2012, concurrently with general availability of Windows 8)
- Asus VivoTab RT (released October 26, 2012)
- Dell XPS 10 (released December 2012; discontinued on September 25, 2013)
- Lenovo IdeaPad Yoga 11 (released December 2012)
- Samsung Ativ Tab (Released in United Kingdom on December 14, 2012; American and German releases cancelled)

After having planned to produce a Windows RT device close to its launch, Acer's president Jim Wong later indicated that there was "no value" in the current version of the operating system, and would reconsider its plans for future Windows RT products when the Windows 8.1 update was released. On August 9, 2013, Asus announced that it would no longer produce any Windows RT products; chairman Johnny Shih expressed displeasure at the market performance of Windows RT, considering it to be "not very promising". During the introduction of its Android and Windows 8-based Venue tablets in October 2013, Dell's vice president Neil Hand stated that the company had no plans to produce an updated version of the XPS 10.

=== Second-generation devices ===
In September 2013, Nvidia CEO Jen-Hsun Huang stated that the company was "working really hard" with Microsoft on developing a second revision of Surface. The Microsoft Surface 2 tablet, which is powered by Nvidia's quad-core Tegra 4 platform and features the same full HD display as the Surface Pro 2, was officially unveiled on September 23, 2013, and released on October 22, 2013, following Windows 8.1 general availability the previous week. On the same day as the Surface 2's release, Nokia (the acquisition of their mobile business by Microsoft had just been announced, but not yet been completed) unveiled the Lumia 2520, a Windows RT tablet with a Qualcomm Snapdragon 800 processor, 4G LTE, and a design similar to its line of Windows Phone products. An LTE-capable version of the Surface 2 was made available the following year.

In January 2015, after its stock sold out on Microsoft Store online, Microsoft confirmed that it had discontinued further production of the Surface 2 to focus on Surface Pro products. Microsoft ended production of the Lumia 2520 the following month, ending active production of Windows RT devices after just over two years of general availability. With the end of production for both Surface 2 and Lumia 2520, Microsoft and its subsidiaries no longer manufacture any Windows RT devices.

=== Cancelled devices ===
Microsoft originally developed a "mini" version of its Surface tablet later known as Surface Mini and had planned to unveil it alongside the Surface Pro 3 in May 2014; it was reportedly cancelled at the last minute. Images of the product were leaked in June 2017, revealing specifications such as a Qualcomm Snapdragon 800, an 8-inch display, and support for the Surface Pen instead of a keyboard attachment.

In July 2016, an image depicting a number of cancelled Nokia-branded Lumia devices was released, depicting a prototype for a second Nokia tablet known as the Lumia 2020. Details revealed in September 2017 showed the product to have an 8.3-inch display and the same Snapdragon 800 chip as that of the Surface "mini" tablet.

== Reception ==
Windows RT's launch devices received mixed reviews upon their release. In a review of the Asus VivoTab RT by PC Advisor, Windows RT was praised for being a mobile operating system that still offered some PC amenities such as a full-featured file manager, but noted its lack of compatibility with existing Windows software, and that it had no proper media player aside from a "shameless, in-your-face conduit to Xbox Music." AnandTech believed Windows RT was the first "legitimately useful" mobile operating system, owing in part to its multitasking system, bundled Office programs, smooth interface performance, and "decent" support for a wider variety of USB devices in comparison to other operating systems on the ARM architecture. However, the OS was panned for its slow application launch times in comparison to a recent iPad, and spotty driver support for printers. The small number of "quality" apps available on launch was also noted—but considered to be a non-issue, assuming that the app ecosystem would "expand significantly unless somehow everyone stops buying Windows-based systems on October 26th."

Reception of the preview release of RT 8.1 was mixed; both ExtremeTech and TechRadar praised the improvements to the operating system's tablet-oriented interface, along with the addition of Outlook; TechRadar's Dan Grabham believed that the inclusion of Outlook was important because "nobody in their right mind would try and handle work email inside the standard Mail app—it's just not up to the task." However, both experienced performance issues running the beta on the Tegra 3-based Surface; ExtremeTech concluded that "as it stands, we’re still not sure why you would ever opt to buy a Windows RT tablet when there are similarly priced Atom-powered x86 devices that run the full version of Windows 8."

=== Market relevance and response ===
The need to market an ARM-compatible version of Windows was questioned by analysts because of recent developments in the PC industry; both Intel and AMD introduced x86-based system-on-chip designs for Windows 8, Atom "Clover Trail" and "Temash" respectively, in response to the growing competition from ARM licensees. In particular, Intel claimed that Clover Trail-based tablets could provide battery life rivaling that of ARM devices; in a test by PC World, Samsung's Clover Trail-based Ativ Smart PC was shown to have battery life exceeding that of the ARM-based Surface. Peter Bright of Ars Technica argued that Windows RT had no clear purpose, since the power advantage of ARM-based devices was "nowhere near as clear-cut as it was two years ago", and that users would be better off purchasing Office 2013 themselves because of the removed features and licensing restrictions of Office RT.

Windows RT was also met with lukewarm reaction from manufacturers; in June 2012, Hewlett-Packard canceled its plans to release a Windows RT tablet, stating that its customers felt Intel-based tablets were more appropriate for use in business environments. In January 2013, Samsung cancelled the American release of its Windows RT tablet, the Ativ Tab, citing the unclear positioning of the operating system, "modest" demand for Windows RT devices, plus the effort and investment required to educate consumers on the differences between Windows 8 and RT as reasons for the move. Mike Abary, senior vice president of Samsung's U.S. PC and tablet businesses, also stated that the company was unable to build the Ativ Tab to meet its target price point—considering that lower cost was intended to be a selling point for Windows RT devices. Nvidia CEO Jen-Hsun Huang expressed disappointment over the market performance of Windows RT, but called on Microsoft to continue increasing its concentration on the ARM platform. Huang also commented on the exclusion of Outlook from the Office 2013 suite included on the device and suggested that Microsoft port the software for RT as well (in response to public demand, Microsoft announced the inclusion of Outlook with future versions of Windows RT in June 2013). In May 2013, reports surfaced that HTC had scrapped plans to produce a 12-inch Windows RT tablet as it would cost too much to produce, and that there would be greater demand for smaller devices.

The poor demand resulted in price cuts for various Windows RT products; in April 2013 the price of Dell's XPS 10 fell from US$450 US to $300, and Microsoft began offering free covers for its Surface tablet in some territories as a limited-time promotion—itself a US$130 value for the Type Cover alone. Microsoft also reportedly reduced the cost of Windows RT licenses for devices with smaller screens, hoping that this could spur interest in the platform. In July 2013, Microsoft cut the price of the first-generation Surface worldwide by 30%, with its U.S. price falling to $350. Concurrently, Microsoft reported a loss of US$900 million due to the lackluster sales of the device. In August 2013, Dell silently pulled the option to purchase the XPS 10 from its online store without a keyboard dock (raising its price back up to US$479), and pulled the device entirely in September 2013. Microsoft's "fire sale" of the Surface RT did result in a slight increase of market share; in late-August 2013, usage data from the advertising network AdDuplex (which provides advertising services within Windows Store apps) revealed that Surface usage had increased from 6.2 to 9.8%.

=== Restrictions and compatibility limitations ===
In contrast to Windows 8 (where the feature had to be enabled by default on OEM devices, but remain user-configurable), Microsoft requires all Windows RT devices to have UEFI Secure Boot permanently enabled, preventing the ability to run alternative operating systems on them. Tom Warren of The Verge stated that he would have preferred Microsoft to "keep a consistent approach across ARM and x86, though, not least because of the number of users who'd love to run Android alongside Windows 8 on their future tablets", but noted that the decision to impose such restrictions was in line with similar measures imposed by other mobile operating systems, including recent Android devices and Microsoft's own Windows Phone mobile platform.

The requirement to obtain most software on Windows RT through Windows Store was considered to be similar in nature to the application stores on other "closed" mobile platforms; where only software certified under guidelines issued by the vendor (i.e. Microsoft) can be distributed in the store. Microsoft was also criticized by the developers of the Firefox web browser for effectively preventing the development of third-party web browsers for Windows RT (and thus forcing use of its own Internet Explorer browser) by restricting the development of desktop applications and by not providing the same APIs and exceptions available on Windows 8 to code web browsers that can run as apps. However, the European Union, in response to a complaint about the restrictions in relation to an antitrust case involving Microsoft, ruled that "so far, there are no grounds to pursue further investigation on this particular issue." As mandated by the EU, the BrowserChoice.eu service is still included in Windows 8.

==== "Jailbreak" exploit ====
In January 2013, a privilege escalation exploit was discovered in the Windows kernel that can allow unsigned code to run under Windows RT; the exploit involved the use of a remote debugging tool (provided by Microsoft to debug WinRT apps on Windows RT devices) to execute code which changes the signing level stored in RAM to allow unsigned code to execute (by default, it is set to a level that only allows code signed by Microsoft to execute). Alongside his explanation of the exploit, the developer also included a personal appeal to Microsoft urging them to remove the restrictions on Windows RT devices, contending that their decision was not for technical reasons, and that the devices would be more valuable if this functionality were available. In a statement, a Microsoft spokesperson applauded the effort, indicating that the exploit does not pose a security threat because it requires administrative access to the device, advanced techniques, and would still require programs to be re-compiled for ARM. However, Microsoft has still indicated that the exploit would be patched in a future update.

A batch file-based tool soon surfaced on XDA Developers to assist users in the process of performing the exploit, and a variety of ported desktop applications began to emerge, such as the emulator Bochs, PuTTY and TightVNC. Afterwards, an emulator known as "Win86emu" surfaced, allowing users to run x86 software on a jailbroken Windows RT device. However, it does not support all Windows APIs, and runs programs slower than they would on a native system.

== Demise ==
In November 2013, speaking about Windows RT at the UBS Global Technology Conference, Julie Larson-Green made comments discussing the future of Microsoft's mobile strategy surrounding the Windows platform. Larson-Green stated that in the future (accounting for Windows, Windows RT, and Windows Phone), Microsoft was "[not] going to have three [mobile operating systems]." The fate of Windows RT was left unclear by her remarks; industry analysts interpreted them as signs that Microsoft was preparing to discontinue Windows RT due to its poor adoption, while others suggested that Microsoft was planning to unify Windows with Windows Phone. Microsoft ultimately announced its "Universal Windows Apps" platform at Build 2014, which would allow developers to create WinRT apps for Windows, Windows Phone, and Xbox One that share common codebases. These initiatives were compounded by a goal for Windows 10 to unify the core Windows operating system across all devices.

Critics interpreted Microsoft's move to cancel the launch of a smaller Surface model in May 2014 as a further sign that Microsoft, under new CEO Satya Nadella, and new device head Stephen Elop (who joined Microsoft upon the purchase of Nokia's mobile phone business in September 2013, only to depart the company the following year), was planning to further downplay Windows RT, given that the company had shifted its attention towards a higher-end, productivity-oriented market with the Pro 3—one which would be inappropriate for Windows RT given its positioning and limitations. Analysts believed that Microsoft was planning to leverage its acquisition of Nokia's device business for future Windows RT devices, possibly under the Lumia brand;

On January 21, 2015, Microsoft unveiled Windows 10 Mobile, an edition of Windows 10 for smartphones and sub-8-inch tablets running on ARM architecture; unlike RT, which was based upon the user experience of the PC version, Windows 10 on these devices is a continuation of the Windows Phone user experience that emphasizes the ability for developers to create "universal" Windows apps that can run across PCs, tablets, and phones, and only supports the modern-style interface and Windows apps (although on compatible devices, a limited desktop experience will be available when connected to an external display). Following the event, a Microsoft spokesperson stated that the company was working on a Windows RT update that would provide "some of the functionality of Windows 10", and the company ended production of both the Surface 2 and Lumia 2520.

Microsoft's purchase of Nokia ultimately turned out to be a failure, and Microsoft would eventually leave the consumer mobile phone market, selling its assets to Foxconn and HMD Global in May 2016.

Newer Intel processors for mobile devices were more competitive in comparison to ARM equivalents in regards to performance and battery life; this factor and other changes made by Microsoft, such as the removal of Windows OEM license fees on devices with screens less than 9 inches in size, spurred the creation of a market for lower-end tablets running the full Windows 8 operating system on Intel-compatible platforms, leaving further uncertainty over Microsoft's support of ARM outside of smartphones—where they remain ubiquitous. Such a device came in March 2015, when Microsoft unveiled a new low-end Surface model, the Intel Atom-based Surface 3; unlike previous low-end Surface models, Surface 3 did not use ARM and Windows RT. It was succeeded in 2018 by the Pentium Gold Surface Go.

Windows 8.1 RT Update 3 (KB3033055) was released on September 16, 2015; it adds a version of the updated Start menu seen in early preview versions of Windows 10 (which combines an application list with a sidebar of tiles), but otherwise does not contain any other significant changes to the operating system or its functionality, nor any support for Windows 10's application ecosystem. The Verge characterized this update as being similar to Windows Phone 7.8—which similarly backported user interface changes from Windows Phone 8 (which switched from a Windows Mobile-derived platform to one derived from the NT kernel), without making any other significant upgrades to the platform.

== Impact on future Windows versions ==
=== ARM support ===
On December 7, 2016, Microsoft announced that as part of a partnership with Qualcomm, it planned to launch an ARM version of Windows 10 for Snapdragon-based devices, initially focusing on laptops. Unlike Windows RT, the ARM version of Windows 10 supports using an emulation layer to run software compiled for 32-bit x86 architectures. The following year, Microsoft announced the Always Connected PC brand, covering Windows 10 devices with cellular connectivity; the launch featured two Snapdragon 835-powered 2-in-1 laptops from Asus and HP, and an integration of Qualcomm's Snapdragon X16 gigabit LTE modem with AMD's Ryzen Mobile platform.Windows 11 would additionally add support for 64-bit x86 emulation.

=== Windows 10 S ===
On May 2, 2017, Microsoft unveiled Windows 10 S, an edition of Windows 10 designed primarily for low-end mobile devices targeting the education market (competing primarily with Google's Linux-based ChromeOS). Similarly to Windows RT, it restricted software installation to applications obtained via Windows Store. Windows 10 S was replaced by S Mode, a mode in which manufacturers can ship Windows 10 computers with the same restrictions, but they can be turned off by the user.
