= Reller =

Reller is a surname. Notable people with the surname include:

- Elizabeth Reller (1913–1974), American actress
- Paul Reller, American composer
- Tami Reller (born 1963/64), American businesswoman

== See also ==
- Keller (surname)
- Teller (surname)
