= Sinofsky =

Sinofsky is a surname. Notable people with the surname include:

- Bruce Sinofsky (1956–2015), American documentary film director
- Steven Sinofsky (born 1965), American business executive
