= Surface Pro 3 =

Tablet computer by Microsoft

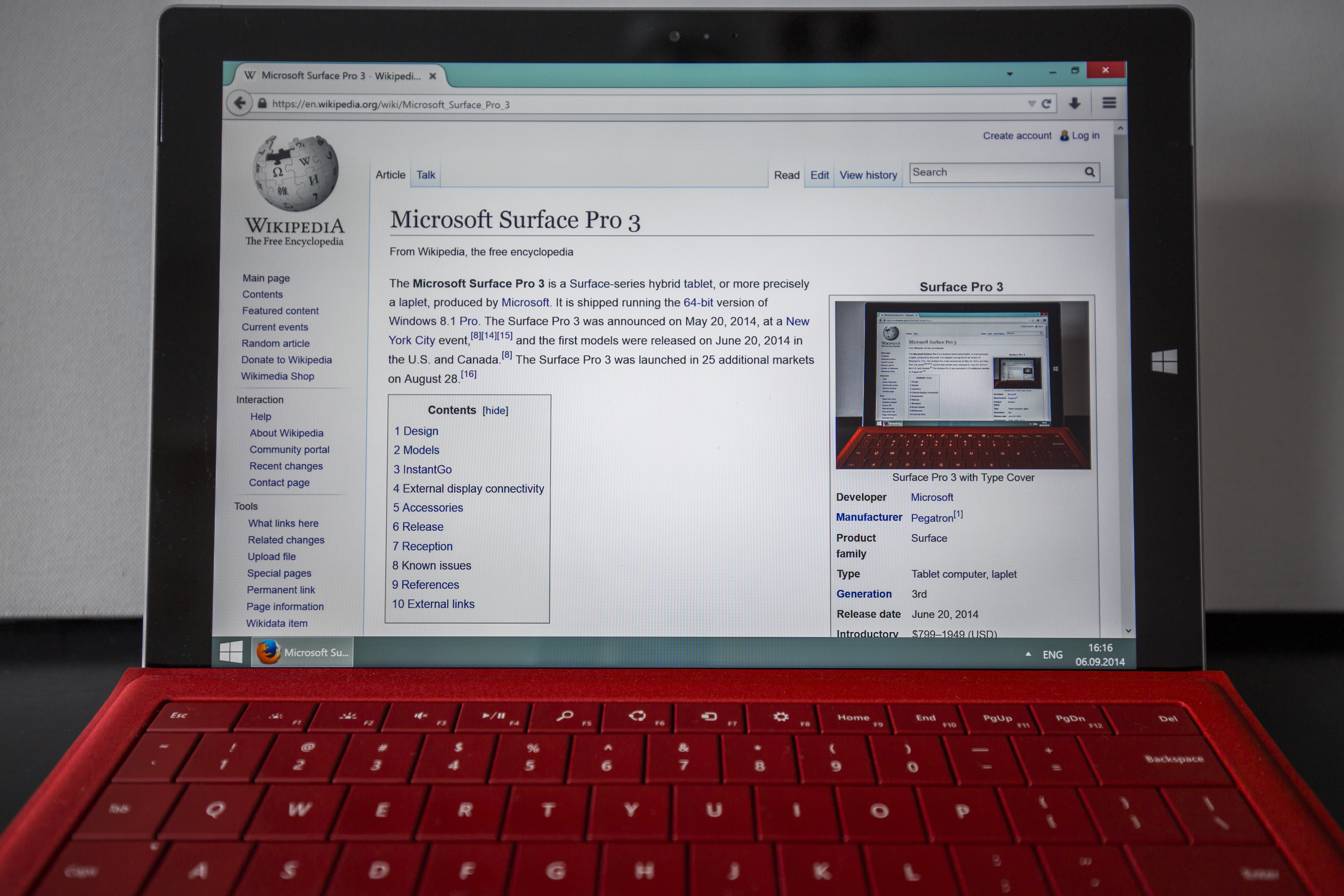
- Surface Pro 3 with red Type Cover
- Developer: Microsoft
- Manufacturer: Pegatron
- Product family: Surface
- Type: 2-in-1 detachable
- Generation: 3rd
- Released: June 20, 2014
- Introductory price: US$799–1949
- Discontinued: November 1, 2016
- Operating system: Windows 8.1 Pro; Windows 10 Pro
- CPU: Intel Core i3-4020Y; Intel Core i5-4300U; Intel Core i7-4650U
- Memory: 4 or 8 GB LPDDR3 1600 MHz RAM
- Storage: 64, 128, 256 or 512 GB
- Removable storage: microSDHC
- Display: 12.0 inches (30 cm) 2160x1440 (216 ppi) eDP ClearType HD screen with 3:2 aspect ratio
- Graphics: Intel integrated HD Graphics; HD 4200 in i3 CPU; HD 4400 in i5 CPU; HD 5000 in i7 CPU
- Sound: Front-facing stereo speakers
- Input: Built in: touchscreen, ambient light sensor, accelerometer, gyroscope, magnetometer Sold Separately: type cover, mouse, stylus pen
- Camera: Front: 5 MP; Rear: 5 MP
- Touchpad: On the Surface Pro Type Cover (sold separately)
- Connectivity: Wi-Fi 5, Bluetooth 4.0, USB 3.0, Mini DisplayPort, 3.5 mm audio socket, Cover port, Charging port
- Power: Built-in rechargeable 42 W⋅h (150 kJ) lithium-ion battery 36 W proprietary external power supply with integrated USB charging port
- Online services: Windows Store, OneDrive, Xbox Music, Xbox Games, Xbox Video
- Dimensions: 11.5 in × 7.93 in × 0.36 in (29.21 cm × 20.14 cm × 0.91 cm)
- Weight: 1.76 pounds (800 g)
- Predecessor: Surface Pro 2
- Successor: Surface Pro 4
- Related: Surface 3
- Website: www.microsoft.com/surface

The Surface Pro 3 is the third-generation Surface-series 2-in-1 detachable, designed, developed, marketed, and produced by Microsoft. It originally ran the Windows 8.1 Pro operating system (OS), but the optional upgrade to Windows 10 Pro (OS) operating system was later added.

== History ==
The older, original Surface and Surface 2, with their ARM-based processors and Windows RT operating system, are pitched against the iPad and other tablets. The Surface Pro 3 (like the preceding Surface Pro and Surface Pro 2), with its x64 Intel CPU and Windows 8 OS, is a full-fledged PC that competes against Ultrabooks (particularly those convertible laptops with touchscreens for a tablet functionality, flexible hinges, detachable keyboards, or sliders) and other high-end sub notebooks such as the MacBook Air.

The Surface Pro 3 was announced on May 20, 2014, at a New York City event, pre-orders were opened on May 21, 2014, and the first models were released on June 20, 2014 in the U.S. and Canada, with the Intel Core i3 and Intel Core i7 models released on August 1, 2014. The Surface Pro 3 was launched in 25 additional markets on August 28.

On October 6, 2015, Microsoft released its successor, the Surface Pro 4 with a bigger screen with a higher resolution and reduced bezels, faster CPU options, a thinner body and improved cooling system.

== Features ==
=== Hardware ===
The Surface Pro 3 has a body made of magnesium alloy giving a gray matted finish to the back of the device. The charging port is magnetized and connects securely to the charger.

It comes with an improved kickstand, allowing the device to be set at any angle between 22 and 150 degrees. The kickstand has a high resistance which provides firmness and prevents accidental sliding.

The Surface Pro 3 features a larger 12 inches (30 cm) (screen display area 25.4 cm x 16.9 cm) display over its predecessor. The screen has a 3:2 aspect ratio which Microsoft claims allow the device to be used more comfortably in the portrait orientation. Because the touch screen digitizer and the pen digitizer are combined into a single layer, the screen is physically thinner than that of its predecessors, which improves viewing angle.

Although the Surface Pro 3 has a larger screen than its predecessor, it is both thinner and lighter, weighing 100 grams (0.22 lb) less. Microsoft claims the Surface Pro 3 is capable of up to 9 hours of web browsing.

The Surface Pro 3 is built on the 4th generation Intel Core processor with TPM chip for enterprise security. It includes a USB 3.0 port and a Mini DisplayPort on the right, an audio jack on the left, and a hot swap microSD slot on the back of the device. The microSD slot supports memory cards up to 200 GB. The internal solid-state drive and system memory are not user upgradeable.

Surface Pro 3 external display connectivity
CPU model	Display 1	Display 2	Display 3
i3	eDP/DisplayPort (2560x1600, 60 Hz)	DisplayPort (2560x1600, 60 Hz)	DisplayPort (2560x1600, 60 Hz)
i3	eDP/DisplayPort (2560x1600, 60 Hz)	DVI (2560x1600, 60 Hz)	DVI (2560x1600, 60 Hz)
i3	eDP/DisplayPort (2560x1600, 60 Hz)	VGA (1920x1200, 60 Hz)	VGA (1920x1200, 60 Hz)
i3	eDP/DisplayPort (2560x1600, 60 Hz)	HDMI (4096x2304, 24 Hz)	WiDi (1920x1080, 60 Hz)
i5/i7	eDP/DisplayPort (3200x2000, 60 Hz)	DisplayPort (3200x2000, 60 Hz)	DisplayPort (3200x2000, 60 Hz)
i5/i7	eDP/DisplayPort (3200x2000, 60 Hz)	DVI (2560x1600, 60 Hz)	DVI (2560x1600, 60 Hz)
i5/i7	eDP/DisplayPort (3200x2000, 60 Hz)	VGA (1920x1200, 60 Hz)	VGA (1920x1200, 60 Hz)
i5/i7	eDP/DisplayPort (3200x2000, 60 Hz)	HDMI (4096x2304, 24 Hz)	WiDi (1920x1080, 60 Hz)
(maximum resolution and refresh rate shown in parentheses)

Surface Pro 3 configuration options
Price tier (USD)	CPU	Integrated GPU	RAM	Internal storage
$799	Intel Core i3-4020Y (1.5 GHz)	HD 4200	4 GB	64 GB
$999	Intel Core i5-4300U (1.9 to 2.9 GHz)	HD 4400	4 GB	128 GB
$1,299	Intel Core i5-4300U (1.9 to 2.9 GHz)	HD 4400	8 GB	256 GB
$1,299	Intel Core i7-4650U (1.7 to 3.3 GHz)	HD 5000	8 GB	128 GB
$1,549	Intel Core i7-4650U (1.7 to 3.3 GHz)	HD 5000	8 GB	256 GB
$1,949	Intel Core i7-4650U (1.7 to 3.3 GHz)	HD 5000	8 GB	512 GB

==== External display connectivity ====
Like its predecessor, the Surface Pro 3 is capable of connecting up to three external displays. To connect a third display the 2-in-1's own screen should be turned off.

The device itself has a single Mini DisplayPort output and in order to connect two external displays one can additionally use a secondary Mini DisplayPort on a docking station accessory (sold separately). To attach three (or fewer) displays, an aftermarket DisplayPort Multi-Stream Transport hub can be used or a daisy chaining feature of compatible displays. One of external displays can be attached over-the-air utilizing Intel Wireless Display (WiDi) technology.

In a single external display mode over DisplayPort, the i5 and i7-based models also support a resolution of 3840x2160 at 60 Hz, known as 4K Ultra HD.

=== Software ===
The Surface Pro 3 initially shipped with Windows 8.1 Pro, but since the Windows 10 release on July 29, 2015, new devices come with the updated OS pre-installed, eliminating the need to upgrade as is the case on existing devices. The Windows 10 upgrade, among other features, brings a Tablet mode, which can be useful when device is used as a tablet, that is without a keyboard attached.

==== InstantGo ====
The Surface Pro 3 is one of the first 64-bit Windows devices that features InstantGo (formerly Connected Standby), allowing for smartphone-type power management capabilities. This allows for Windows Store apps to update info (such as email) while the device appears off, and for the operating system to run automatic maintenance when connected to AC. The Surface will enter hibernation state after four hours of no activity, to further conserve battery power.

With InstantGo active there is only one power plan available with a limited options. InstantGo is currently not supported when Hyper-V is enabled, instead the device will enter hibernation each time it is put into sleep mode.

=== Accessories ===
The Surface-series devices feature a Type Cover accessory, an attachable protective keyboard, which is sold separately, yet has continually appeared in every Surface ad since the launch of the original Surface. The Type Cover for Surface Pro 3 features backlit keys, is thinner and has an improved touchpad over its predecessors. It also has a magnetic strip which binds to the front bezel of the display for additional stability. The magnetic strip can also be used to elevate the position of the keyboard, which can help to comfortably use a Type Cover on a lap.

The Surface Pro 3 is the first Surface device to feature an improved version of the Surface Pen, which is included with each device. In contrast to that from the earlier devices of the Pro line, which was based on Wacom technology, the Surface Pen of the Surface Pro 3 features N-trig DuoSense technology with 256 levels of pressure sensitivity.

Microsoft also offers a docking station, which adds five USB ports (including three USB 3.0), a Gigabit Ethernet port, an additional Mini DisplayPort (which can be used simultaneously with the port on the Surface Pro 3) and a 3.5 mm audio socket for audio input/output.

Some of Microsoft's wireless touch mice were restyled to match the Surface-series devices design, added where applicable a Bluetooth connectivity and relaunched as Surface Edition series mice: Arc Touch Mouse Surface Edition and Wedge Touch Mouse Surface Edition.

== Reception ==
The Surface Pro 3 has received positive reviews. David Pogue suggested "The upshot is that, with hardly any thickness or weight penalty, the kickstand and the Type Cover let you transform your 1.8-pound tablet into an actual, fast, luxury laptop". Pogue said that the Surface Pro 3's form factor works well as a tablet, in contrast to the Surface Pro 2, whose bulk and weight limited its appeal as a tablet. Pogue also stated that the new multi-stage kickstand, 3:2 screen aspect ratio, and new Type Cover 3 detachable keyboard made it a competent laptop.

It has been suggested that the Surface Pro 3 comes closest to the Microsoft Tablet PC concept that company founder Bill Gates announced in 2001, being the first Surface to become a credible laptop replacement. Time magazine included Microsoft Surface Pro 3 in the list of the 25 best inventions of 2014.

The Surface Pro 3 received a repairability score of 1/10 from iFixit because of the use of a strong adhesive material throughout and the difficulty in removing the display.

== Timeline ==
Timeline of Surface devices
Sources: Microsoft Devices Blog Microsoft Surface Store Microsoft Surface for Business store

Preceded by Surface Pro 2	Surface Pro; 3rd generation	Succeeded by Surface Pro 4
