= Marco Iansiti =

Italian-American business professor

- Born: Rome
- Education: Harvard College
- Employer: Harvard Business School
- Title: David Sarnoff Professor of Business Administration
- Board member of: Keystone Strategy, Inc.; iMatchative; PDF Solutions

Marco Iansiti is a professor at the Harvard Business School, whose primary research interest is technology and operations strategy and the management of innovation. He is the David Sarnoff Professor of Business Administration, heads the Technology and Operations Management Unit, and chairs the Digital Initiative. He is also the Chairman of the Board of Keystone Strategy, a consultancy focused on strategy, data sciences and economics for technology clients.

== Education ==
Iansiti graduated summa cum laude from Harvard University in 1983, with an A.B. in Physics. He subsequently went on to perform his Ph.D. in Physics at Harvard University Iansiti's Ph.D. thesis focused on experimental low temperature electronics and semiconductor microfabrication techniques. He won the Robbins Physics Prize in 1986, and was awarded his Ph.D. in September 1988. He was awarded an IBM post-doctoral fellowship for 1988–1989, and performed research on the design and fabrication of next-generation microelectronic devices at Harvard University.

== Selected publications ==
- One Strategy: Organization, Planning, and Decision Making (Wiley, 2009).

Iansiti writes with Steven Sinofsky of Microsoft Corporation on the gap that often develops between top-down, directed strategy and bottom-up, emergent behavior within an organization. Iansiti and Sinofsky discuss the approach Sinofsky took within the Windows and Windows Live Group at Microsoft to bridge this gap during the development of the Windows 7 operating system.

- The Keystone Advantage: What the New Dynamics of Business Ecosystems Mean for Strategy, Innovation, and Sustainability (Harvard Business School Press, 2004)

Iansiti writes with Roy Levien about the concept of the business ecosystem, whereby complex business networks can be thought of as interdependent ecosystems. Within this context, Iansiti discusses the role of Keystones, firms that create a platform that sustains and enhances the health and performance of the business ecosystem.

- Technology Integration: Making Critical Choices in a Turbulent World (Harvard Business School Press, 1997)

Iansiti writes about the choices faced by high-tech firms regarding the adoption and integration of new technologies into the firm's offerings. Iansiti assesses the performance of technology integration projects and makes suggestions for organizational best practices.
