= Surface 3 =

2-in-1 detachable by Microsoft

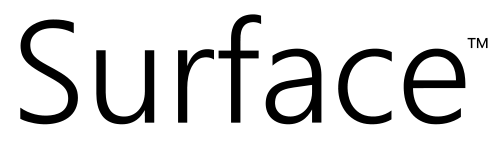

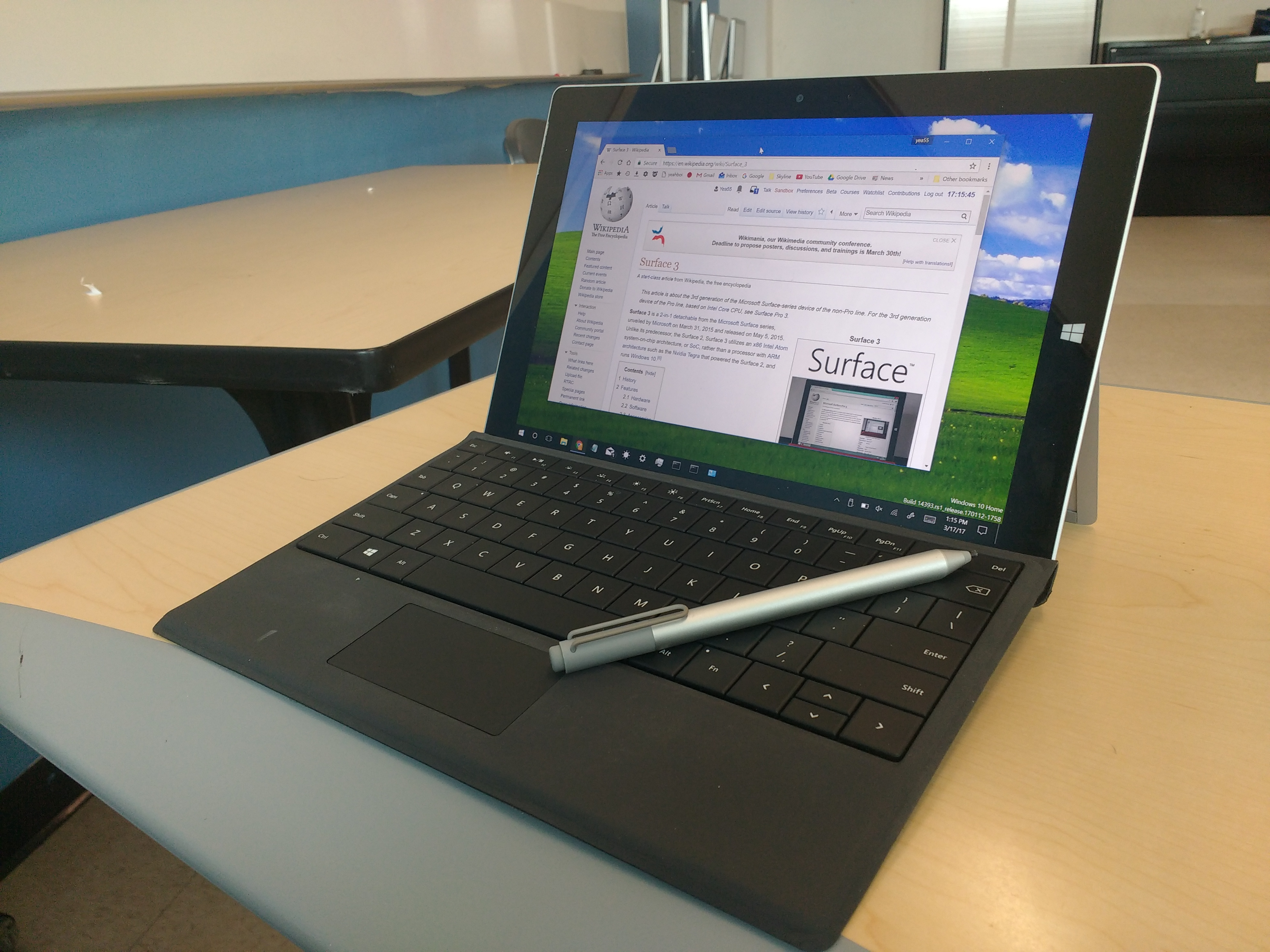
- Surface 3 with Type Cover and Surface Pen running Windows 10
- Developer: Microsoft
- Manufacturer: Pegatron
- Product family: Surface
- Type: 2-in-1 detachable
- Generation: 3rd
- Released: 5 May 2015
- Introductory price: $499–599 (USD)
- Discontinued: late 2016
- Operating system: Windows 8.1; Windows 10
- System on a chip: Intel Atom system-on-chip quad-core x7-Z8700; 1.6 up to 2.40 GHz, 2 MB cache, 2 W
- Memory: 2 or 4 GB LPDDR3 1600 MHz
- Storage: 64 or 128 GB (37 and 93 GB respectively are user-available)
- Removable storage: microSD
- Display: 10.8 inches (27 cm): (9 inches (23 cm) by 6 inches (15 cm)) 1920x1280 (214 ppi) ClearType screen with 3:2 aspect ratio
- Graphics: Intel HD Graphics
- Sound: Dual front facing speakers
- Input: Multi-touch touchscreen Bluetooth active pen, with underlying N-trig DuoSense technology (sold separately); Type Cover detachable keyboard with touchpad (sold separately)
- Camera: Front: 3.5 MP, 1080p HD; Rear: 8 MP, 1080p HD
- Touchpad: On the Surface Type Cover (sold separately)
- Connectivity: Wireless: 802.11 a/b/g/n/ac Wi-Fi; Bluetooth 4.0 LE; Ports: Full size USB 3.0; Mini DisplayPort; 3.5 mm audio socket Cover port (proprietary); Charging/Docking port (Micro-USB); 4G LTE (with cellular model)
- Power: Battery; 3.78V 27.5Wh/7270mAh charger 5.2V 2.5A (13W)
- Online services: Windows Store, OneDrive, Xbox Music, Xbox Games, Xbox Video
- Dimensions: 10.51 inches (267 mm) (width); 7.36 inches (187 mm) (height); 0.34 inches (8.6 mm) (depth)
- Weight: 1.37 pounds (620 g); 0.58 pounds (265 g) (add for Type Cover)
- Predecessor: Surface 2
- Successor: Discontinued, replaced by Surface Go
- Related: Surface
- Website: www.microsoft.com/surface

Surface 3 is a 2-in-1 detachable from the Microsoft Surface series, introduced by Microsoft in 2015. Unlike its predecessor, the Surface 2, Surface 3 utilizes an x86 Intel Atom system-on-chip architecture, or SoC, rather than a processor with ARM architecture such as the Nvidia Tegra that powered the Surface 2, and runs standard versions of Windows 8.1 or Windows 10.

== History ==
The older, original Surface (also known as Surface RT) and Surface 2, with their ARM-based processors and Windows RT operating system, were designed to compete with the iPad and other tablets. The first Surface was criticized for performance issues, which were reduced in the succeeding Surface 2. Due to the differing processors, these devices were incompatible with the vast number of Windows programs written for x86-based computers, running only those written and compiled for Windows RT, loaded from Microsoft's application store.

Released prior to Surface 3, the Surface Pro 3 – featuring a more powerful Intel Core processor, and running the standard version of Windows 8 – became a profitable product for Microsoft in late 2014. It had a starting price of $799, featuring a larger display, and competed with high-end ultraportable laptops.

With the introduction of the Surface 3, Microsoft aimed to make a product more affordable than the Surface Pro 3, at the expense of screen size and performance, while retaining the broad software compatibility.

The Surface Pro 3 was replaced by the Surface Pro 4, but the Surface 3 was discontinued after a year and a half, with no similar successor. Another year and a half later, the Surface Go – with similar characteristics, but improved performance – was introduced, followed by successor models.

== Features ==
=== Hardware ===
The Surface 3 share a similar design to the Surface Pro 3 with a body made of magnesium alloy giving a matte gray finish to the back of the device. It features a kickstand that can be set to three different angles: 22, 44, and 60 degrees. The Surface 3 does not have a fan, therefore lacking the ventilation holes seen on Surface Pro line. The Surface 3 weighs 620 grams features a 10.8 inches (27 cm) diagonal multi-touch display with a 3:2 aspect ratio. For a charger Surface 3 uses a standard Micro-USB, giving users a wider variety of charging options, including charging the device with a mobile phone charger.

Surface 3 has the 14 nm quad-core Intel Atom x7-Z8700 SoC. The Surface 3's has a resolution of 1920x1280, and it can drive an external display over Mini DisplayPort. The device ships with either a 64 or 128 GB solid-state drive and 2 or 4 GB of system memory. The device's storage capacity can be increased by installing a microSD memory card of up to 1 TB.

Technical Specifications
		Surface 3	Surface 3 LTE
System-on-chip		Intel Atom x7-Z8700 x86-64 SoC; 4x cores @ 1.60 GHz (2.40 GHz burst frequency); 2 or 4 GB LPDDR3 1600; 2 MB cache	
Internal Storage		64 or 128 GB storage	
Display	Size	10.8" display	
Display	Aspect Ratio	3:2	
Display	Resolution	1920x1280 px	
Display	Touch	10-point multi-touch screen	
Exterior	Height	7.36 in (18.7 cm)	
Exterior	Width	10.52 in (26.7 cm)	
Exterior	Depth	0.34 in (0.86 cm)	
Exterior	Weight	1.37 lb (0.62 kg)	
Cameras	Front	3.5 MP 1080p	
Cameras	Rear	8 MP 1080p	
Audio	Speaker	2x Dolby audio speakers	
Audio	Microphone	1x microphone	
Sensors		Ambient light sensor; Proximity; Accelerometer; Gyroscope; Magnetometer	
Ports		1x USB-A 3.0 port; Mini DisplayPort 1.1; microSD card slot; Micro USB charging port; 3.5 mm headset jack; Cover Connector	
Ports		-	Nano SIM card slot
Wireless	Wi-fi	802.11 a/b/g/n/ac	
Wireless	Bluetooth	4.0	
Battery		27.5 Wh	

=== Software ===
Unlike its predecessors, the Surface 3 is the first device in the non-Pro line to feature the full Windows desktop OS as opposed to Windows RT. This therefore puts the device into the category of 2-in-1 PC, which cannot be said for its predecessors, the original Surface and Surface 2, due to their use of ARM processors.

Surface 3s purchased before 29 July 2015 come with Windows 8.1 but were upgradeable to Windows 10 for free. After the Windows 10 release, consumer models of the Surface 3 shipped with Windows 10 Home, unlike the devices of the Surface Pro line, which shipped with Windows 10 Pro. Business models of the Surface 3 shipped with Windows 10 Pro.

=== Accessories ===
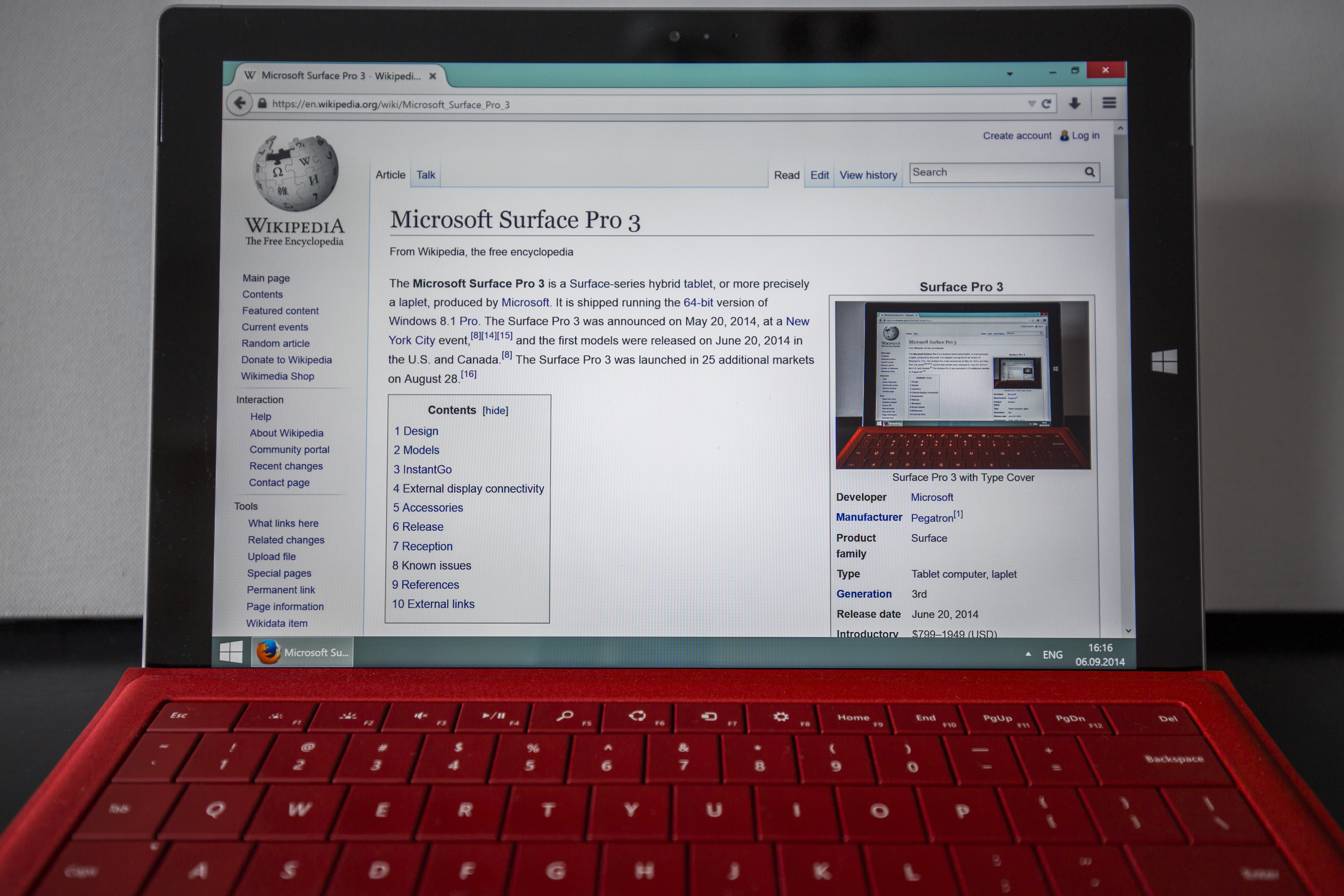
Surface Pro 3 with red Type Cover

The Surface 3, as with its predecessors and Surface devices of a Pro line, features an optional Type Cover accessory—an attachable keyboard, which is also a protective cover for the screen, with an announced price of 129 USD.

The Surface 3 is the first non-Pro Surface to support the Surface Pen. Unlike Surface Pro 3, however, it is not included with purchase, but is available for purchase separately.

Various aftermarket USB or Bluetooth peripheral devices, such as keyboards and mice can be connected to the Surface 3.

== Configurations ==
Surface 3 Configurations
Price Tier (USD)	SoC	RAM	Internal Storage	LTE
$449	Intel Atom x7-Z8700	2 GB	64 GB	No
$599	Intel Atom x7-Z8700	2 GB	64 GB	Yes
$599	Intel Atom x7-Z8700	4 GB	128 GB	No
$699	Intel Atom x7-Z8700	4 GB	128 GB	Yes

== Reception ==
Surface 3 received generally positive reviews from computer critics. They praised Microsoft's shift from ARM architecture toward x86, and therefore from Windows RT to a regular Windows OS. Most noted a well designed chassis and accessories produced of quality materials, and overall premium feeling of use. While less powerful, the Surface 3 was a lighter and cheaper alternative to the Surface Pro 3. More importantly, the Surface 3 could compete at the high-end of Android and iPad tablets, with the advantage of being a device running a full desktop OS instead of a mobile OS for a similar price. Reviewers also note that 37 GB of the total storage space in the low-end Surface 3 is available to the user, while its close competitor, the low-end iPad Air 2, has only 12.5 GB of user-available storage space for the same price.

The most common downsides are relatively low battery life, slower performance compared to devices with Intel Core processors and a high price since accessories like Surface Pen and Type Cover are not included.

== Timeline ==
Timeline of Surface devices
Sources: Microsoft Devices Blog Microsoft Surface Store Microsoft Surface for Business store

Preceded by Surface 2	Surface; 3rd generation	Succeeded by Surface Go
