= Tami Reller =

American businesswoman (born c. 1963)

- Born: 1963 or 1964 (age 62–63); Grand Forks, North Dakota
- Education: Minnesota State University Moorhead, Saint Mary's College of California
- Employer: Microsoft Corporation (2001-2014)
- Title: Executive vice president, marketing

Tami L. Reller (born 1963 or 1964) is an American businesswoman.

== Early life and education ==
Reller was born in Grand Forks, North Dakota. She earned a bachelor's degree in mathematics from Minnesota State University Moorhead and a master's degree in business administration from Saint Mary's College of California.

== Career ==
In 1984, while still attending college, Reller began her career at Great Plains Software. She joined Microsoft Corporation in 2001 as part of Microsoft's acquisition of Great Plains Software, where she had served as a chief financial officer (CFO). After serving as a corporate vice president within the Microsoft Business Solutions Group, she joined the Windows division in 2007 and in 2009 added marketing responsibilities while retaining her role as chief financial officer. In 2012, after the departure of Steven Sinofsky, she assumed responsibility for the Windows business in addition to serving as chief financial officer and chief marketing officer of the company's Windows division. In July 2013, she was promoted to executive vice president of marketing at Microsoft Corporation.

In March 2014, Reller left Microsoft.
