= Surface 2 =

Hybrid tablet computer by Microsoft

- Developer: Microsoft
- Type: Hybrid tablet
- Released: October 22, 2013
- Discontinued: January 27, 2015
- Operating system: Windows RT 8.1
- System on a chip: Nvidia Tegra 4
- CPU: 1.7 GHz ARM Cortex-A15 quad core with power saving 5th core
- Memory: 2 GB
- Storage: 32 GB (18 GB available) or 64 GB (47 GB available) internal storage and a microSD card reader (Cards up to 64GB)
- Display: 10.6 inches (27 cm) 1920×1080 px(208 ppi) ClearType HD screen with 16:9 aspect ratio
- Graphics: 72 GeForce graphics cores (24 vertex shaders + 48 pixel shaders)
- Sound: Dolby Digital Plus stereo speakers
- Input: 5-point multi-touch screen, dual microphones for noise cancellation, 3-axis accelerometer, 3-axis gyroscope, compass, ambient light sensor, GPS (with cellular model)
- Camera: Front: 3.5 MP, 1080p HD; Rear: 5 MP, 1080p HD
- Connectivity: 2×2 MIMO Wi-Fi (802.11 a/b/g/n), Bluetooth 4.0, full-size USB 3.0, HD Video Out (micro HDMI), 4G LTE (with cellular model)
- Online services: Windows Store, OneDrive, Xbox Music, Xbox Games, Xbox Video
- Dimensions: 10.81 inches (27.5 cm) (width); 6.81 inches (17.3 cm) (height); 0.35 inches (8.9 mm) (depth)
- Weight: 1.49 pounds (680 g)
- Predecessor: Surface
- Successor: Surface 3

Surface 2 is a Surface-series Windows RT hybrid tablet computer created by Microsoft. It was unveiled on September 23, 2013, and released on October 22, 2013 and is the successor to the original Surface. As of January 2015, Microsoft no longer manufactures Surface 2, and provided security updates for the device until January 2023. Microsoft's next attempt at a Windows-on-ARM tablet would be the Surface Pro X, released in 2019, six years after the Surface 2.

== History ==
Pre-orders for the Surface 2 were opened on September 24, 2013, and the device was released on October 22, 2013. As value-added services, the Surface 2 includes 200 GB of additional OneDrive storage for 2 years, 1 year of free Skype calls to landlines, and access to Skype WiFi hotspots.

In January 2015, after its stock sold out on Microsoft Store online, Microsoft confirmed that it had discontinued further production of Surface 2. After Surface 2, the Nokia Lumia 2520 was the only remaining Windows RT device on the market, before that being discontinued as well just a week later.

== Features ==
=== Hardware ===
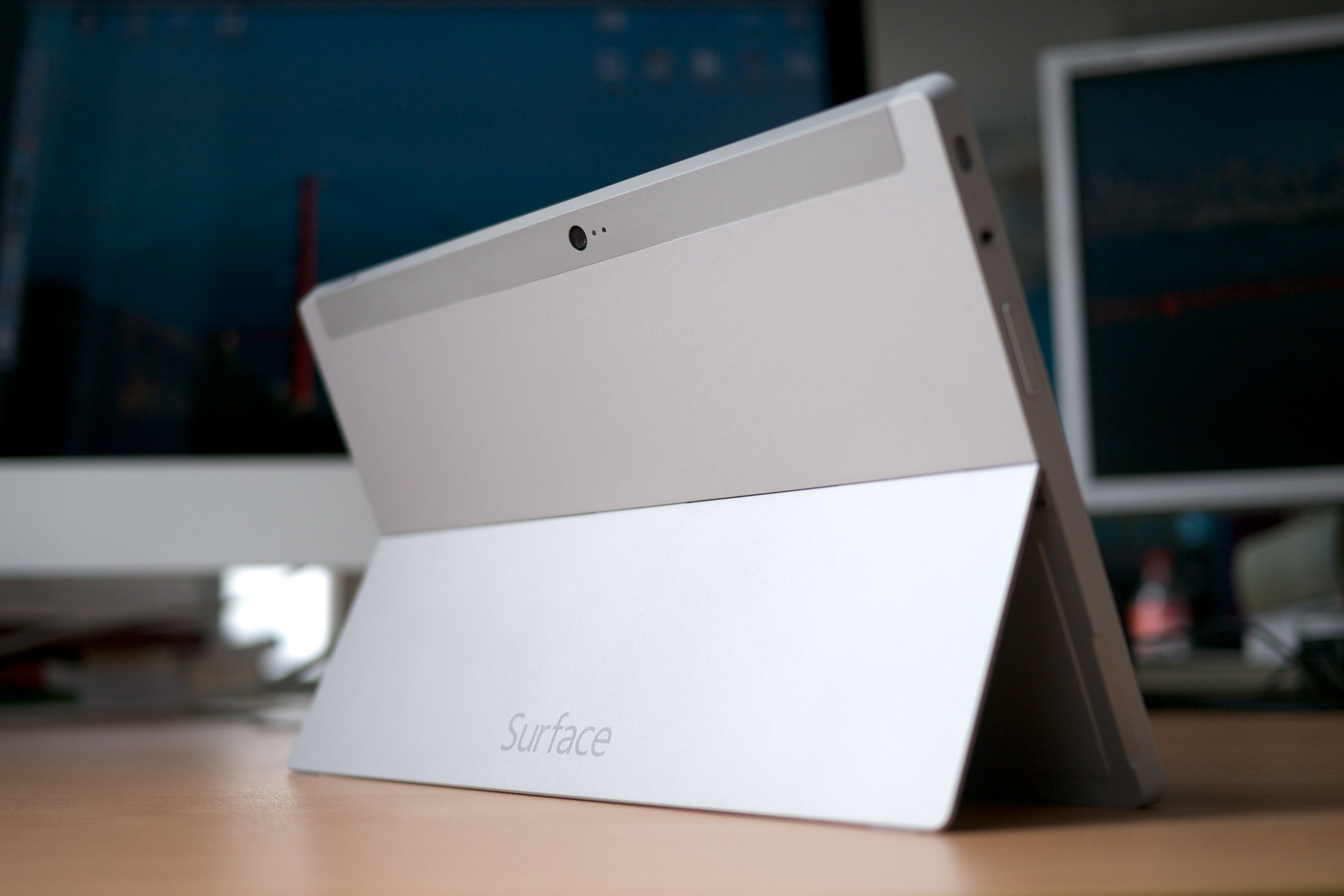
Back of the Surface 2 showing the kick stand.

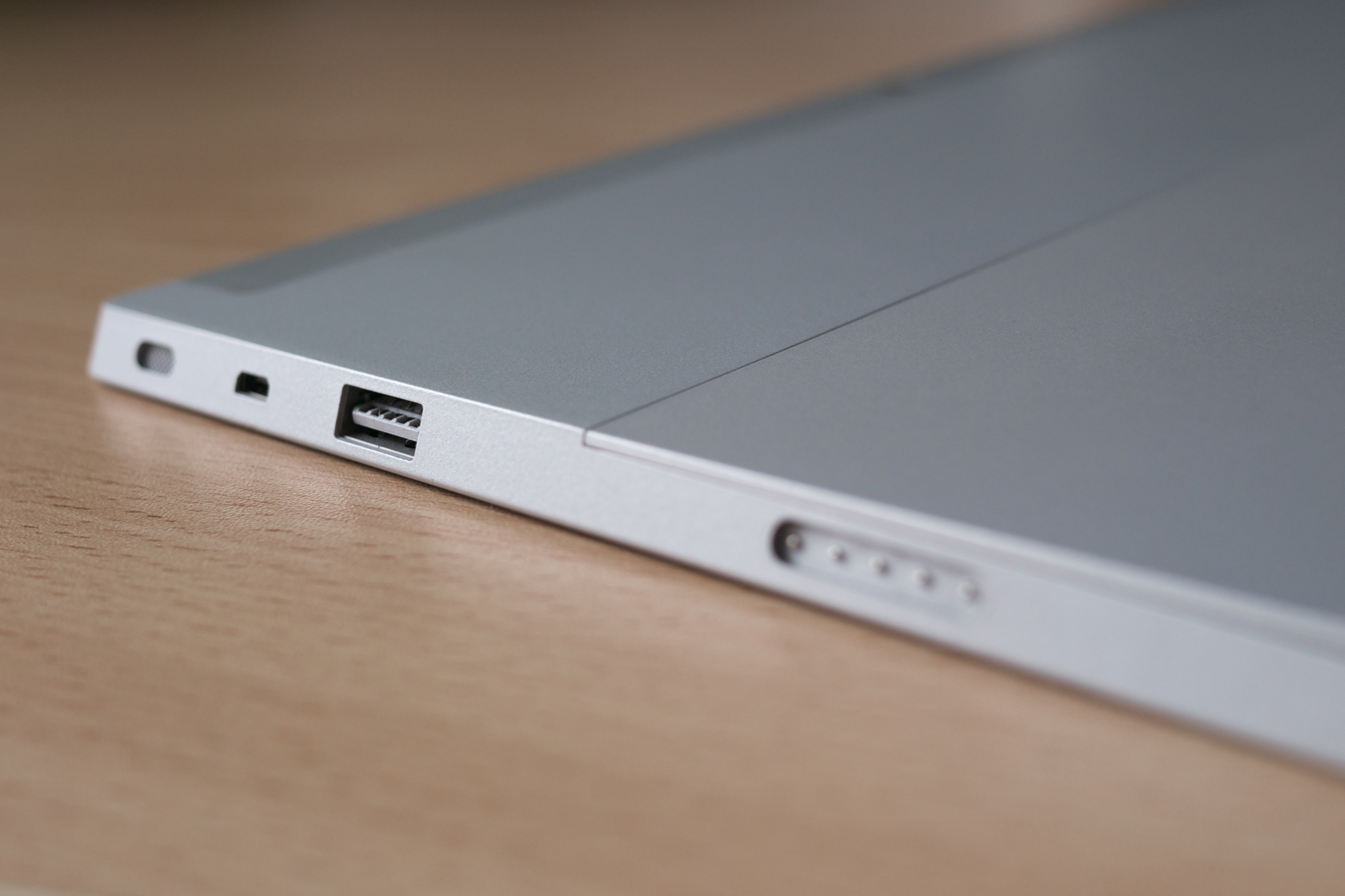
Ports provided by the Surface 2 on the right side.

Made of magnesium alloy and toughened glass, the outer shell of Surface 2 maintains a similar design to its predecessor, but in a "bare metal" silver color scheme with a black bezel. Surface 2 is also slightly thinner and lighter than the previous model. Surface 2 uses a 1.7 GHz quad-core Nvidia Tegra 4 chipset with 2 GB of RAM; Microsoft claimed that the new chipset and other improvements to its internal hardware made the Surface 2 three to four times faster than the original Surface, and that it had 10 hours of battery life playing videos. Unlike the original Surface (which used a 1366 x 768 display), the Surface 2 uses a 1080p display, the same as in Surface Pro 2. This display is claimed to have almost 50% better color than the previous version, as well as the lowest reflectivity among competing tablets. The device also includes a full-size USB 3.0 port, 32 or 64 GB of internal storage, and a MicroSD slot. The Surface 2 ships with Windows RT 8.1.

The 4G LTE model of Surface 2 was launched on March 18, 2014, and comes as a 64 GB model only. AT&T is the Microsoft cellular partner and Surface 2 4G LTE comes with AT&T "All Access" app pre-installed but the device actually ships unlocked. The 4G models also come with GPS, Assisted GPS, and GLONASS. The Surface 2 includes what Microsoft calls a silver-magnesium color that is more scratch resistant compared to the original Surface.

Technical Specifications
		Surface 2	Surface 2 with LTE
Processor		Nvidia Tegra 4 T40	
Graphics		Geforce ULP	
RAM		2 GB	
Internal storage		32/64 GB	64 GB
Display	Size	10.6in ClearType Full HD Display	
Display	Aspect Ratio	16:9	
Display	Resolution	1920 x 1080	
Display	Touch	5-point Multi-touch	
Exterior	Height	6.79in	
Exterior	Width	10.81in	
Exterior	Depth	0.35in	
Exterior	Weight	1.49lbs	
Exterior	Casing	VaporMg	
Exterior	Color	Magnesium	
Cameras	Front	3.5 MP	
Cameras	Rear	5.0 MP	
Audio	Speaker	Stereo with Dolby Sound	
Audio	Microphone	2	
Sensors		Ambient light Accelerometer; Gyroscope; Magnetometer; Proximity; Digital Compass	
Ports		USB-A 3.0 microSD card slot 3.5mm audio socket MicroHDMI; Cover port	
Ports		-	MicroSIM card slot
Wireless	Wi-fi	802.11a/b/g/n	
Wireless	Bluetooth	4.0	
Battery		31.5Wh	
Location		-	GPS; Assisted GPS; GLONASS
Network		-	2G GSM; 3G UMTS; 4G LTE

=== Software ===
The Surface 2 ships with Windows RT 8.1 and Office 2013 RT, unlike the original Surface which launched with Office 2013 RT Beta (but which later received the final release version). Other bundled apps include Mail, Calendar, People (contacts), Bing apps including Food and Drink, Health and Fitness, Weather, Travel, Stocks, and Sports. These apps were later renamed to be MSN apps. Just like its predecessor, desktop apps other than those already bundled with the OS are forbidden to run on the Surface 2, so the device, unlike its successor, Surface 3, cannot be classified as a 2-in-1 PC.

A notable change from the Surface to the Surface 2 is the hiding of the desktop tile from the Start Screen.

=== Accessories ===
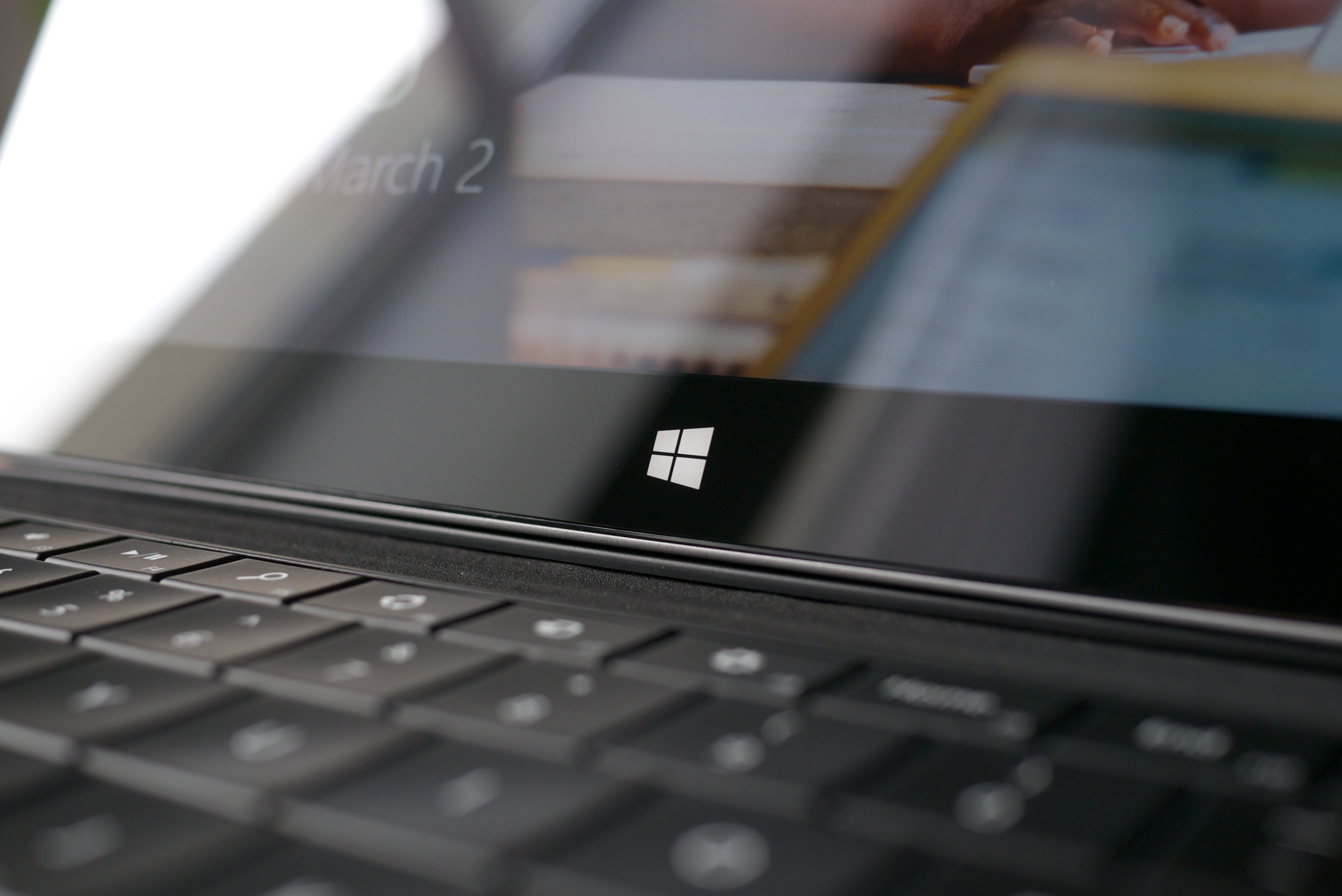
Detail of the front of the device with the Type Cover accessory attached.

Updated versions of the Surface's cover accessories are available for the Surface 2; the Touch Cover 2 and Type Cover 2 are slightly thinner than the previous versions and now include a "dynamic" backlight system. The Touch Cover 2 has over 1,092 sensors on it compared to just 80 on the original Touch Cover. The keyswitch length of the Type Cover 2 have been reduced from 2.5 mm to 1.5 mm. A new Power Cover accessory was also available to add 30 Wh additional battery capacity to the device. Accompanying the Touch Cover 2 and Type Cover 2 was a wireless adapter that allows them to be connected up to 30 feet away via Bluetooth. An updated kickstand can now be tilted at a 55-degree angle alongside the original 22-degree angle. During its unveiling, Microsoft also showcased the Music Cover; a variation of the Touch Cover that serves as a DJ mixer with playback controls, a 16-button sampler, and three sliders. While mainstream public release has been announced, it will be distributed to musicians through the Surface Remix Project campaign.

== Configurations ==
Surface 2 Configurations
Price Tier (USD)	CPU	Integrated GPU	RAM	Internal storage	LTE
$449	Nvidia Tegra 4	Geforce ULP	2 GB	32 GB	No
$549	Nvidia Tegra 4	Geforce ULP	2 GB	64 GB	No
$679	Nvidia Tegra 4	Geforce ULP	2 GB	64 GB	Yes

== Reception ==
Initial reviews of the Surface 2 have been mixed. Reviewers have generally been positive about the device's hardware and improvements when compared to the original Surface. However, the Surface 2 was often criticized for a lack of support for traditional Windows desktop programs and the low number of high quality apps available from the Windows Store.

In a financial report from Microsoft in second quarter 2014, revenue more than doubled from $400 million in the first quarter, to $893 million. However, Microsoft still lost $39 million since the development costs had equaled to around $932 million. But skeptics acknowledged that the growth was there despite still losing money on the Surface brand.

=== Overheating issue ===
The Surface 2 has been reported to have some overheating issues. Microsoft delivered an update to try to fix the issue.

== Timeline ==
Timeline of Surface devices
Sources: Microsoft Devices Blog Microsoft Surface Store Microsoft Surface for Business store

Preceded by Surface	Surface; 2nd generation	Succeeded by Surface 3
