= Steven Sinofsky =

American businessman and software engineer

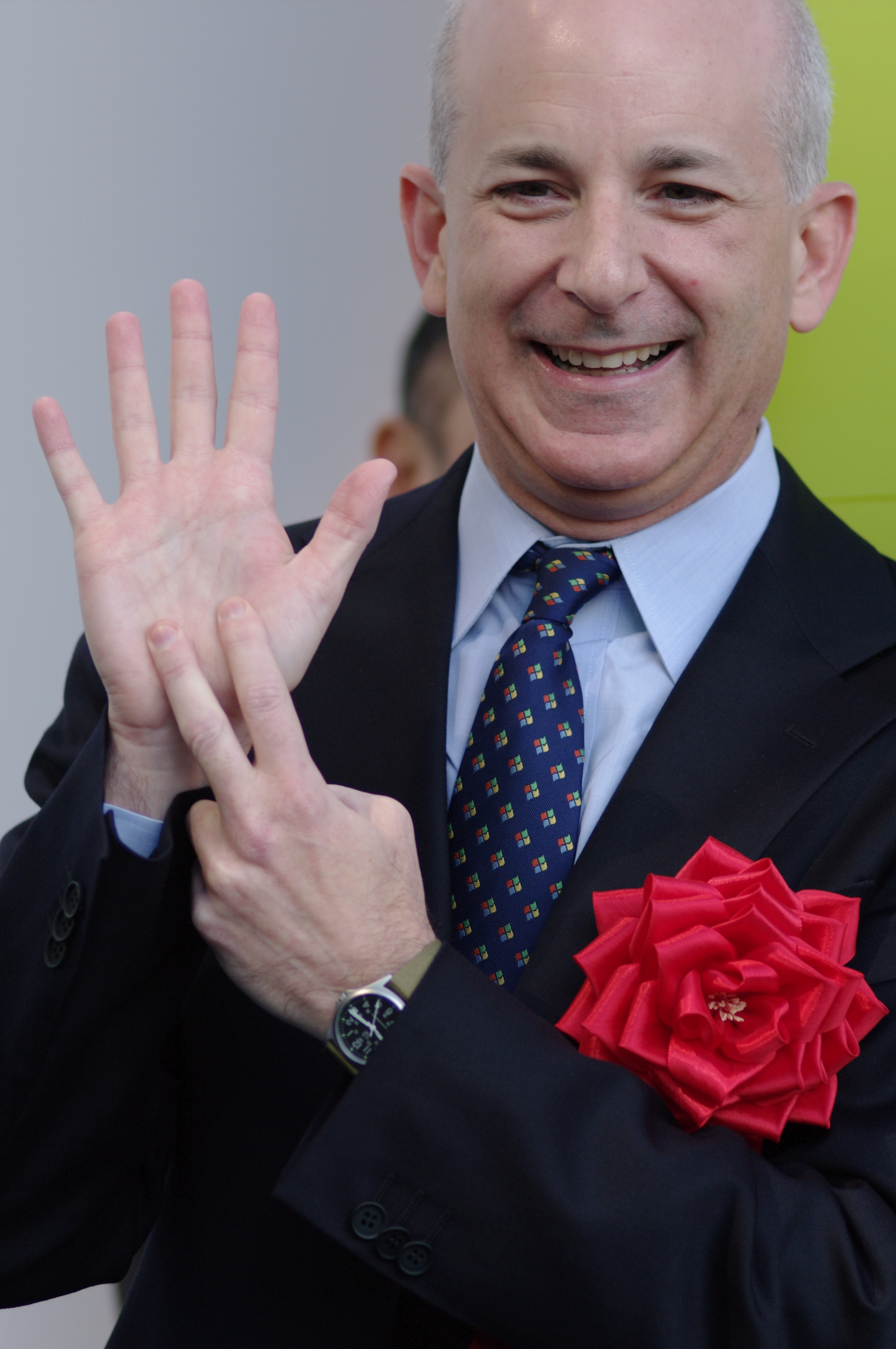
- Sinofsky making a "7" hand gesture at the announcement of Windows 7
- Born: Steven Jay Sinofsky; 1965 (age 60–61); New York City, New York, U.S.
- Education: Cornell University (BA); University of Massachusetts, Amherst (MS)
- Partner: Melanie Walker

Steven Jay Sinofsky (born 1965) is an American businessman, investor and software engineer. He was president of the Windows Division at Microsoft from July 2009 until his resignation in November 2012.

In 1998 and in 2013, Sinofsky was a visiting scholar at Harvard Business School where he worked with students enrolled in a second year class on technology product development taught by Marco Iansiti and Stefan Thomke.

As of 2012, Sinofsky is a board partner at Andreessen Horowitz, where he is on boards of investments.

== Early life ==
Steven Sinofsky was born in New York City in 1965 to parents Marsha and David Sinofsky. His parents worked in the fashion industry, and Sinofsky has described his childhood as "a very classic first generation American Jewish kind of upbringing."

In his youth, the family moved to Orlando, Florida, where they opened a business in sporting goods. Sinofsky's entry into computing was writing an accounting system for the family business on an Osborne 1.

Sinofsky attended Lake Brantley High School in Altamonte Springs, Florida.

== Education and early career ==
Sinofsky attained his Bachelor of Arts from Cornell University, after graduating cum laude in 1987, with a dual major in chemistry and computer science. He pursued his postgraduate education at the University of Massachusetts Amherst, where he studied under J. Eliot B. Moss in the area of object-oriented languages and databases, and acquired a Masters of Science in computer science in 1989. He also spent 3 semesters learning Russian while he was in college.

In the summer of 1984 and 1985, Sinofsky interned at Martin Marietta Data Systems (now Lockheed Martin) in Orlando, Florida. He deployed some of the first IBM PC XT/3720 computers and taught the C programming language to full time engineers.

== Career ==
In July 1989, Sinofsky joined Microsoft as a software design engineer where he was the project lead on the first versions of the Microsoft Foundation Classes C++ for Microsoft Windows and Microsoft Visual C++.

He later served as a technical assistant to Bill Gates. Sinofsky was actively involved in recruiting for Microsoft and improving employee retention. As part of this, he took regular trips to university campuses to interview and recruit students. Sinofsky has blogged in detail about his efforts at Steven Sinofsky's Microsoft TechTalk. The blog also covered topics like what it is like to be a Microsoft employee and what new hires needed to know about Microsoft, Bill Gates, Steve Ballmer, and Windows.

After becoming stuck by a snowstorm in Ithaca during a recruiting visit to his alma mater Cornell University in 1994, Sinofsky noticed that both faculty and students at the university were widely using the newly adopted internet to communicate and study. This was a dramatic change from his time at Cornell that relied on the mainframe program CUInfo for information access. He summarized his excitement in an email and memo, "Cornell Is Wired!" which he distributed, encouraging Gates to take the emerging World Wide Web seriously. This led to led to Gates' "Internet Tidal Wave" memo and the creation of Internet Explorer which began "the internet consumer revolution".

In 1994, when the Office Product Unit was formed, Sinofsky joined the team as group program manager, to oversee the development of Microsoft Office. The charter of the team was to create a suite of products with consistent design and engineering. During this time, the suite transitioned from being end user-focused to being an enterprise product. He also oversaw the last release of 16-bit Office, Office 95, Office 97, Office 2000, Office XP and Office 2003. Under Sinofsky, features like the ribbon UI and Clippy were added. The product expanded to include Outlook, Visio, OneNote, and SharePoint. In 1998, Sinofsky was promoted to vice president of Office and then to senior vice president in 2000.

=== Windows division ===
Sinofsky moved to the Windows division in 2006, where he led the Windows Experience Team, which included Windows user experience and online services such as HotMail and Messenger. He was described as being "charged with nothing short of remaking the very image of Windows" and improving the efficiency and punctuality of releases.

He became the president of the Windows division in July 2009. Sinofsky and Jon DeVaan led the development of Windows 7, the next major version of Windows to come after Windows Vista. Windows 7 proved to be a major success, with a rapidly growing user-base of over 450 million, and its launch contributed to record-breaking revenue earnings for Microsoft in 2010. Sinofsky and DeVaan blogged about the development process on the Engineering Windows 7 blog.

While at Windows, Sinofsky blogged extensively about the project's goals and the development process as a way to communicate with the over 4,000 person team and the rest of Microsoft, ultimately publishing over 1,000 pages of blogs.

Sinofsky's philosophy on Windows 7 was to not make any promises about the product or even discuss anything about the product until Microsoft was sure that it felt like a quality product. This was a radical departure from Microsoft's typical way of handling in-development versions of Windows, which was to publicly share all plans and details about it early in the development cycle. Sinofsky also refrained from labeling versions of Windows "major" or "minor", and instead just called them releases. Sinofsky's leadership style influenced many other Microsoft divisions to follow his principles and practices on product development.

Sinofsky subsequently worked on - Windows 8, Windows Phone 8 and Windows Server 2012, which was intended to modernize Windows. Many of its design changes were meant to allow it to scale across PC and mobile interfaces in response to the rising popularity of touchscreen devices over PCs. Among the most notable changes was the reinvention of Windows for the ARM processors then in use in the iPhone and later the iPad. This was widely viewed as both innovating and a challenge to the Microsoft-Intel partnership. During development, he regularly blogged about the feature set and the process of developing the new OS in his blog, Building Windows 8.

A key element of the effort on ARM processors was the development of a Microsoft ARM-based computer to prove the potential. Sinofsky quietly created an internal team to develop the Surface computers, initially two models Surface RT and Surface Pro, for Nvidia ARM processor and Intel respectively.

Windows 8 launched to mixed reviews, and was deemed a failure by commentators, including Sinofsky himself. However, he also expressed his belief that Windows 8 was simply "too much, too soon," and noting that "being early is the same as being wrong." Some aspects of Windows 8, including live tile menu interfaces and screen edge swiping, became standard components of mobile operating systems.

Sinofsky left Microsoft on December 31, 2012, after the failed launch and the critics of Windows 8 and Windows Phone 8. His departure was described by both parties as a mutual decision, but some news outlets speculated that it was the result of friction between himself and CEO Steve Ballmer. Technology websites Ars Technica and ZDNET drew attention to the sense of staffing changes that occurred after the Windows 8 rollout, and the abrupt manner of his departure. Sinofsky was succeeded by Julie Larson-Green and Tami Reller. Microsoft disclosed in an SEC filing that Sinofsky would have a one-year non-compete contract in exchange for an estimated $14 million of stock.

=== After Microsoft ===
In 2012, Sinofsky joined the venture capital firm Andreessen Horowitz as a board partner. He is an angel investor, and has invested in Tanium, Product Hunt, Everlaw, and Box.

== Writing ==
Sinofsky is known for writing about the technology and startups on various online platforms. In 2013, he started the blog "Learning by Shipping", which focuses on topics like business management and technology innovation.

=== One Strategy ===
Sinofsky co-authored the book One Strategy: Organization, Planning, and Decision Making with Marco Iansiti of Harvard Business School. It was published by John Wiley & Sons in November 2009.

The book discusses Sinofsky's struggle with refocusing the Windows Division after the Vista debacle, and the planning and development of the next major version of Windows that would come after Vista. Sinofsky talks about the focus of making a desirable high-quality product, while making no promises to the public, and shipping and delivering that product on time. The book was built around selected blog posts written by Sinofsky to communicate with the rest of the Microsoft team during the development of Windows 7. Sinofsky's personal insights and experiences recorded through the blog are interspersed with Iansiti's academic commentary on the challenges facing the team.

It was well received by critics. Lisa Oliva wrote that it "provided a great balance between theoretical and practical explanations" in a review for the Journal of Applied Management and Entrepreneurship.

=== Hardcore Software ===
In 2020, it was announced that Sinofsky was writing Hardcore Software: Inside the Rise and Fall of the PC Revolution, a first-person account of the PC told through the projects Sinofsky worked on and the competitive and technology landscape at the time. It focuses on the company's history between the 1980s and the 2010s, as it transitioned from the early home computer era to the PC revolution and finally the smartphone era. The work details the emotions of creating "hardcore software" a reference to the 1988 recruiting slogan that brought Sinofsky to Microsoft. Hardcore Software was first published online in a serial format beginning in 2021.

== Personal life ==
Sinofsky is in a relationship with neurosurgeon Melanie S. Walker, who was mentored by and a "science advisor" to Jeffrey Epstein in the 1990s. They reside in Seattle, Washington. In 2006, Walker joined the Bill & Melinda Gates Foundation as senior program officer. Sinofsky met with Epstein several times to negotiate his exit from Microsoft.
