= AdDuplex =

Cross-promotion network app

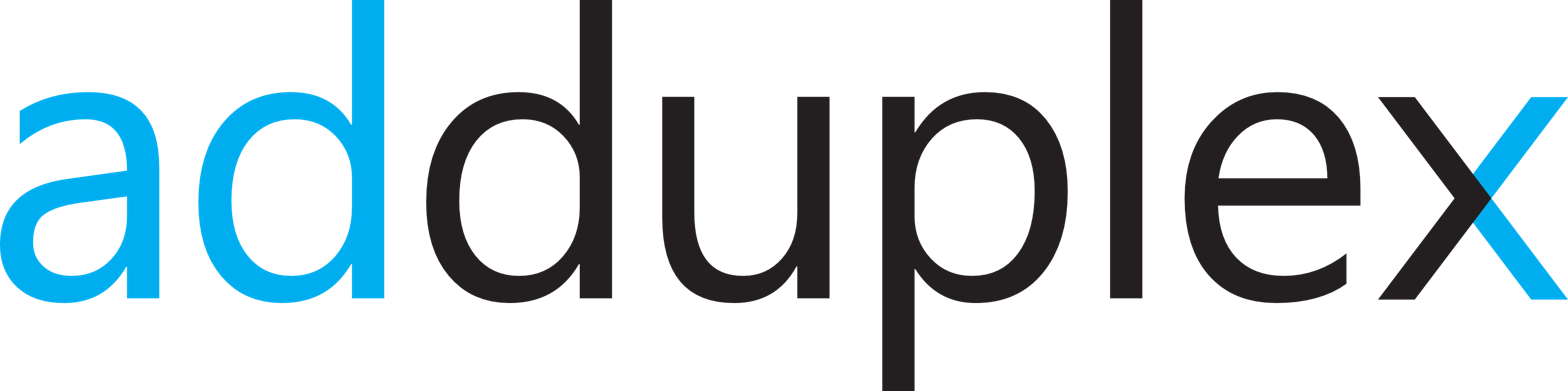
- Industry: Cross-promotion, Advertising, Windows Store apps
- Founded: 2011
- Founder: Alan Mendelevich
- Defunct: 2023
- Website: adduplex.com

AdDuplex was a cross-promotion network for Windows Store apps and games. According to the AdDuplex website, more than 10,000 active apps and games used the network, serving more than 30 million ad impressions per day.

== History ==
AdDuplex was founded by Alan Mendelevich (CEO) in 2011 and is based in Vilnius, Lithuania. In 2012, AdDuplex participated in Startup Sauna accelerator and in 2013 received $500,000 investment from Practica Capital.

In July 2015, AdDuplex released Windows 10 ad SDK for Universal Windows Platform apps.

In August 2015, AdDuplex launched the HERO APP program, which provides free tools and resources to help developers grow their Windows Store apps and games.

== User acquisition ==
=== Cross-promotion ===
The AdDuplex cross-promotion platform allows developers to gain more exposure by helping each other. For each 10 ads one shows in a developer's app, their own ad will be displayed 8 times in other apps on the network. The platform supported different formats, including text, image banners and full-screen (interstitial) ads.

=== Advertising campaigns ===
AdDuplex was used by developers to run targeted paid advertising campaigns to acquire new users. The self-service client area allowed users to control their spending, performance and other metrics of the campaign.

=== Direct campaigns ===
AdDuplex Direct provided a list of high-performing Windows Store apps and games.

== Fill rate ==
AdDuplex was often set up as a fallback to other advertising networks. Generally, whenever the ad space is not being monetized by other ad networks, the app receives free promotion on AdDuplex.

== Founder ==
Alan Mendelevich has been developing software for a living for more than 15 years. He has been an active member of Windows Phone developer community since its inception. Alan has delivered talks on Windows Phone development, marketing and monetization at multiple events in US, UK, Baltics, Finland and Russia. In 2015, Alan was rewarded as Microsoft MVP for Windows Platform Development.
