= Surface (2012 tablet) =

Hybrid tablet computer developed and manufactured by Microsoft

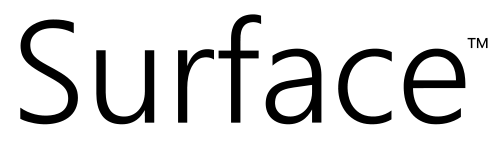

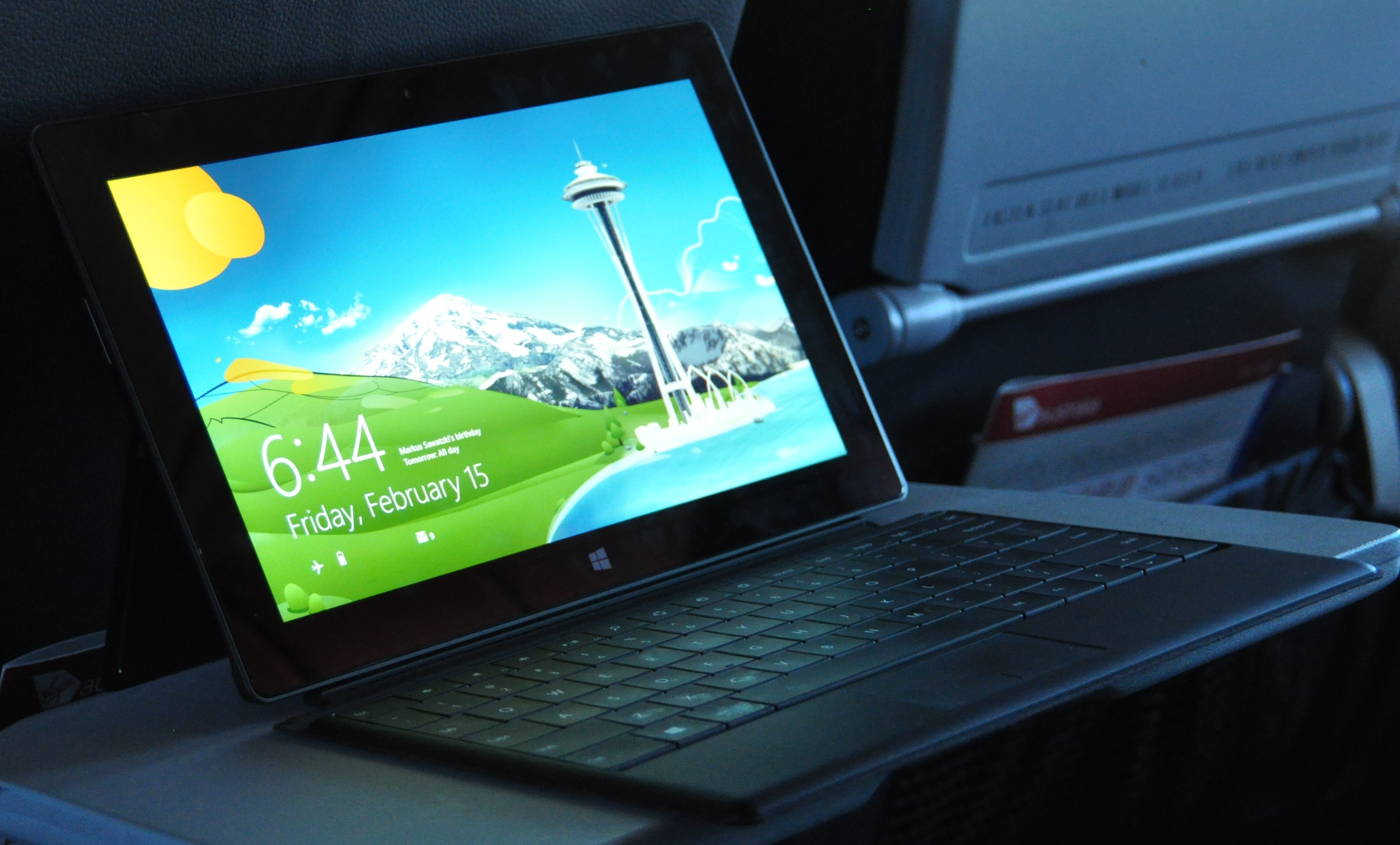
- The original Surface RT with Type Cover attached
- Developer: Microsoft
- Product family: Microsoft Surface
- Type: Hybrid tablet
- Released: October 26, 2012
- Discontinued: July 18, 2013
- Operating system: Windows RT, upgradable to Windows RT 8.1
- System on a chip: 1.3 GHz Nvidia Tegra 3
- Memory: 2 GB DDR3 SDRAM
- Storage: 32/64 GB eMMC microSDXC card slot
- Display: 1366 × 768 (16:9) px 10.6" LCD
- Sound: Stereo speakers, 3.5mm headphone jack
- Input: 5-point multi-touch digitizer; Accelerometer; Ambient light sensor; Gyroscope; Magnetometer
- Connectivity: Wi-Fi (802.11 a/b/g/n); Bluetooth 4.0; USB 2.0; HD video out (Micro-HDMI)
- Power: Built-in rechargeable Li-Po 31.5 Wh; 24 W power supply
- Online services: Microsoft account services: Windows Store; OneDrive; Outlook.com; Xbox Music; Xbox Video; Xbox Live
- Dimensions: W: 10.81 inches (27.5 cm), H: 6.77 inches (17.2 cm), D: 0.37 inches (9.4 mm)
- Weight: 1.5 pounds (680 g)
- Successor: Surface 2

The first-generation Surface (launched as Surface with Windows RT, later marketed as Surface RT) is a hybrid tablet computer developed and manufactured by Microsoft. Announced in June 2012, it was released in October 2012, and was the first personal computer designed in-house by Microsoft.

Positioned as a competitor to Apple's iPad line, Surface included several distinctive features, including a folding kickstand which allowed the tablet to stand at an angle, and the availability of optional attachable protective covers incorporating a keyboard. Surface served as the launch device for Windows RT, a limited version of Windows 8 designed for devices based on ARM architecture, with the ability to run only Metro-style Windows applications developed for it and distributed through the Windows Store.

Surface was met with mixed reviews. Although praised for its hardware design, accessories, and aspects of its operating system, criticism was directed towards the performance of the device, as well as the limitations of the Windows RT operating system and its application ecosystem. Sales of the Surface were poor, with Microsoft cutting its price worldwide and taking a US$990 million loss in July 2013 as a result. It was succeeded by the Surface 2 in 2013, with the newer Windows RT 8.1, which was also made available for the original Surface. Support for the OS ended on January 10, 2023.

== History ==
The device was announced at a press-only event in Los Angeles and was the first PC which Microsoft had designed and manufactured in-house. The Surface only supports WiFi for wireless connectivity, with no cellular variant. The tablet went on sale in eight countries - Australia, Canada, China, France, Germany, Hong Kong, the United Kingdom, and the United States. The Surface Pro was launched later.

== Features ==
=== Hardware ===
The Surface tablet has a display of 1366×768 pixels on a five-point multi-touch touchscreen. The device measures 10.81 by 6.77 by 0.37 inches (27.46 cm × 17.20 cm × 0.94 cm) and is made from magnesium. The kickstand, USB port, and a magnetic keyboard interface give the Surface ability to add a wireless mouse, external keyboard, or a thumb drive. There is also a slot for a microSD card to add up to 200 GB.

Technical specifications
System-on-chip		Nvidia Tegra 3 ARM SoC; 4× ARM Cortex-A9 cores @ 1.30 GHz clock; 2 GB DDR3 SDRAM
Storage		32 or 64 GB eMMC internal storage offerings; Expandable microSDXC card storage
Display	Size	10.6" LCD
Display	Aspect ratio	16:9
Display	Screen resolution	1366×768 px (96 pixels per inch)
Display	Touch	5-point touch digitizer
Exterior	Height	6.7 inches (17.02 cm)
Exterior	Width	10.8 inches (27.43 cm)
Exterior	Depth	0.37 inches (9.40 mm)
Exterior	Weight	1.5 pounds (0.68 kg)
Exterior	Casing	VaporMg
Exterior	Color	Dark Titanium
Cameras	Front	1280×720p (0.9 MP) camera
Cameras	Rear	1280×720p (0.9 MP) camera
Audio	Speaker	2× stereo speakers
Audio	Microphone	2× microphone
Sensors		Ambient light sensor; Accelerometer; Gyroscope; Magnetometer
Ports		1× USB-A 2.0 port; microSDXC card slot; 3.5mm headphone jack; MicroHDMI port; Proprietary touch/type cover attachment
Wireless	Wi-Fi	802.11a/b/g/n
Wireless	Bluetooth	4.0
Battery		31.5 Wh

=== Software ===
Surface runs Windows RT, which is preloaded with Windows Mail, Calendar, Contacts, Sports, News, Travel, Finance, Camera, Weather, Reader, SkyDrive, Store, Photos, Skype (no longer supported), Maps, Games, Messaging, Bing, Desktop, and Xbox Music and Xbox Video Windows Store applications, and supports Microsoft Office Home and Student 2013 RT, which includes Word, PowerPoint, Excel, and OneNote within the Desktop application. Windows RT only allows installing Windows Store applications. Windows RT is compiled entirely for the ARM instruction set architecture.

A major update to Windows RT was launched on October 17, 2013, called Windows RT 8.1. This update brought many improvements to the Surface, such as an overhauled Mail app, more Bing apps like Reading List, and OneDrive (updated from SkyDrive). It also brought support for larger tiles, a help and tips app, Internet Explorer 11, Outlook 2013 RT, changes to PC Settings, lock screen photo slideshow, infinitely re-sizable apps, a Start button, and speed improvements. Later, an update to Windows RT 8.1, dubbed Windows RT 8.1 Update added a search button to the Start Screen, as well as the taskbar on the Modern UI, and a title bar for Modern UI apps.

=== Accessories ===
Surface launched with two accessories, the Type Cover and the Touch Cover. The Touch Cover came in white, black, magenta, red, and cyan, while the Type Cover came in black. Limited edition Touch Covers were released featuring laser-etched artwork on the back. The Touch and Type Covers double as keyboards and magnetically attach to the Surface's "accessory spine".

Later, adapters for micro-HDMI to HDMI and VGA were released.

== Configurations ==
Surface RT Configurations
Price Tier (USD)	SoC	RAM	Internal Storage	Accessories
$499	Nvidia Tegra 3	2 GB	32 GB	-
$599	Nvidia Tegra 3	2 GB	32 GB	Black Touch Cover
$699	Nvidia Tegra 3	2 GB	64 GB	Black Touch Cover

== Reception ==
CNET praised the design of Surface, noting that it "looked practical without being cold, and just feels like a high-quality device that Microsoft cut few corners to make." The kickstand was also praised for its feel and quality, while both the kickstand and the keyboard cover accessories were also noted for having a "satisfying" clicking sound when engaged or attached. The covers were deemed "essential to getting the complete Surface experience", with the touch cover praised for having a more "spacious" typing area than other tablet keyboard attachments, and for being usable after getting used to its soft feel. The Type Cover was recommended over the Touch Cover due to its higher quality and more conventional key design. Surface's display was praised for its larger size and widescreen aspect ratio over the iPad line but panned for having "muted" color reproduction. While the touchscreen-oriented aspects of the Windows 8 interface were praised for being "elegant", albeit harder to learn than Android or iOS, the Windows RT operating system was criticized for still requiring the use of the mouse-oriented desktop interface to access some applications and settings not accessible from within the "Metro" shell, and for its poor application ecosystem, with Windows Store's state on-launch compared to "a ghost town after the apocalypse." The poor performance of the Surface, especially in comparison to other Tegra 3-based tablets, also led to disapproval. In conclusion, it was felt that "paired with a keyboard cover, the Surface is an excellent Office productivity tool (the best in tablet form) and if your entertainment needs don't go far beyond movies, TV shows, music, and the occasional simple game, you're covered there as well", but that assuming Windows Store would eventually improve its application selection, "both it and the Surface's wonky performance keep a useful productivity device from reaching true tablet greatness."

Sales of the Surface and other Windows RT devices were poor; in July 2013, Microsoft reported a loss of US$900 million due to lackluster sales of the Surface, and cut its price by 30% worldwide. Microsoft's price cut did result in a slight increase of market share for the device; by late-August 2013, usage data from the advertising network AdDuplex (which provides advertising services within Windows Store apps) revealed that Surface's share had increased from 6.2 to 9.8%.

== Timeline ==
Timeline of Surface devices
Sources: Microsoft Devices Blog Microsoft Surface Store Microsoft Surface for Business store

Preceded by –	Surface; 1st generation	Succeeded by Surface 2
