= History of tablet computers =

The history of tablet computers and the associated special operating software is an example of pen computing technology, and thus the development of tablets has deep historical roots. The first patent for a system that recognized handwritten characters by analyzing the handwriting motion was granted in 1914. The first publicly demonstrated system using a tablet and handwriting recognition instead of a keyboard for working with a modern digital computer dates to 1956.

== Early tablets ==
The tablet computer and the associated special operating software is an example of pen computing technology, and the development of tablets has deep historical roots.

In addition to a number of academic and research systems, there were several companies with commercial products in the 1980s: Pencept and Communications Intelligence Corporation were among the best known of a crowded field.

=== Fictional and prototype tablets ===
Tablet computers appeared in a number of works of science fiction in the second half of the 20th century, with the depiction of Arthur C. Clarke's NewsPad appearing in Stanley Kubrick's 1968 film 2001: A Space Odyssey, the description of the Calculator Pad in the 1951 novel Foundation by Isaac Asimov, the Opton in the 1961 novel Return from the Stars, by Stanislaw Lem, and The Hitchhiker's Guide to the Galaxy in Douglas Adams 1978 comedy of the same name, all helping to promote and disseminate the concept to a wider audience. Star Trek: The Next Generation also featured extensive use of tablet computers.

In 1968, Alan Kay envisioned a KiddiComp; while a PhD candidate he developed and described the concept as a Dynabook in his 1972 proposal: A personal computer for children of all ages, the paper outlines the requirements for a conceptual portable educational device that would offer functionality similar to that supplied via a laptop computer or (in some of its other incarnations) a tablet or slate computer with the exception of the requirement for any Dynabook device offering near eternal battery life. Adults could also use a Dynabook, but the target audience was children.

Steve Jobs of Apple envisioned in a 1983 speech an "incredibly great computer in a book that you can carry around with you and learn how to use in 20 minutes". In 1985, as the home-computer market significantly declined after several years of strong growth, Dan Bricklin said that a successful home computer needed to be the size of and as convenient to carry as a spiral notebook. He and others urged the industry to research the Dynabook concept. In 1988, Apple, as part of the "Design the Personal Computer of the Year 2000" contest, awarded a project named TABLET, inspired by the Dynabook. This tablet included all the features found in "modern" smartphones: camera, video recorder, microphone, speaker, cellular communication, GPS, and more.

In 1986, Hindsight, a startup in Enfield CT, developed the Letterbug, an 8086-based tablet computer for the educational market. Prototypes were shown at trade shows in New England in 1987, but no production models ever came out.

=== Early devices ===
In 1987 Linus Technologies released the Write-Top, the first tablet computer with pen input and handwriting recognition. It weighed 9 pounds and was based on MS-DOS with an electroluminescent backlit CGA display and a "resistive type touch screen in which a voltage is applied to the screen edges, and a stylus detects the voltage at the touched location." The handwriting had to be individually trained for each user. Around 1500 units were sold.

1988, Hermann Hauser, co-founder of Acorn Computers, with Olivetti, would establish the Active Book Company Ltd, to develop an ARM based pen computer, with GSM connectivity, and utilising a Smalltalk based touch OS. The company would be bought by AT&T, and some technology borrowed for its 1991 EO Personal Communicator.

In 1989, Grid Systems released the GridPad 1900, the first commercially successful tablet computer. It weighed 4.5 pounds and had a tethered pen resistive screen like the Write-Top. The handwriting recognition was created by Jeff Hawkins who led the GridPad development and later created the PalmPilot. Its GRiDPen software ran on MS-DOS and was later licensed as PenRight.

The 1991, Atari ST-PAD Stylus was demonstrated but did not enter production.

In 1991, AT&T released their first EO Personal Communicator, this was one of the first commercially available tablets and ran the GO Corporation's PenPoint OS on AT&T's own hardware, including their own AT&T Hobbit CPU.

In 1992, Samsung introduced the PenMaster. It was based around the Intel i386SL CPU. As the OS, it used the newly released Windows for Pen Computing from Microsoft. The touchscreen relied on a chipset by Wacom and it used a battery powered pen. GRID Systems licensed the design from Samsung and was also sold as the better known GRiDPad SL.

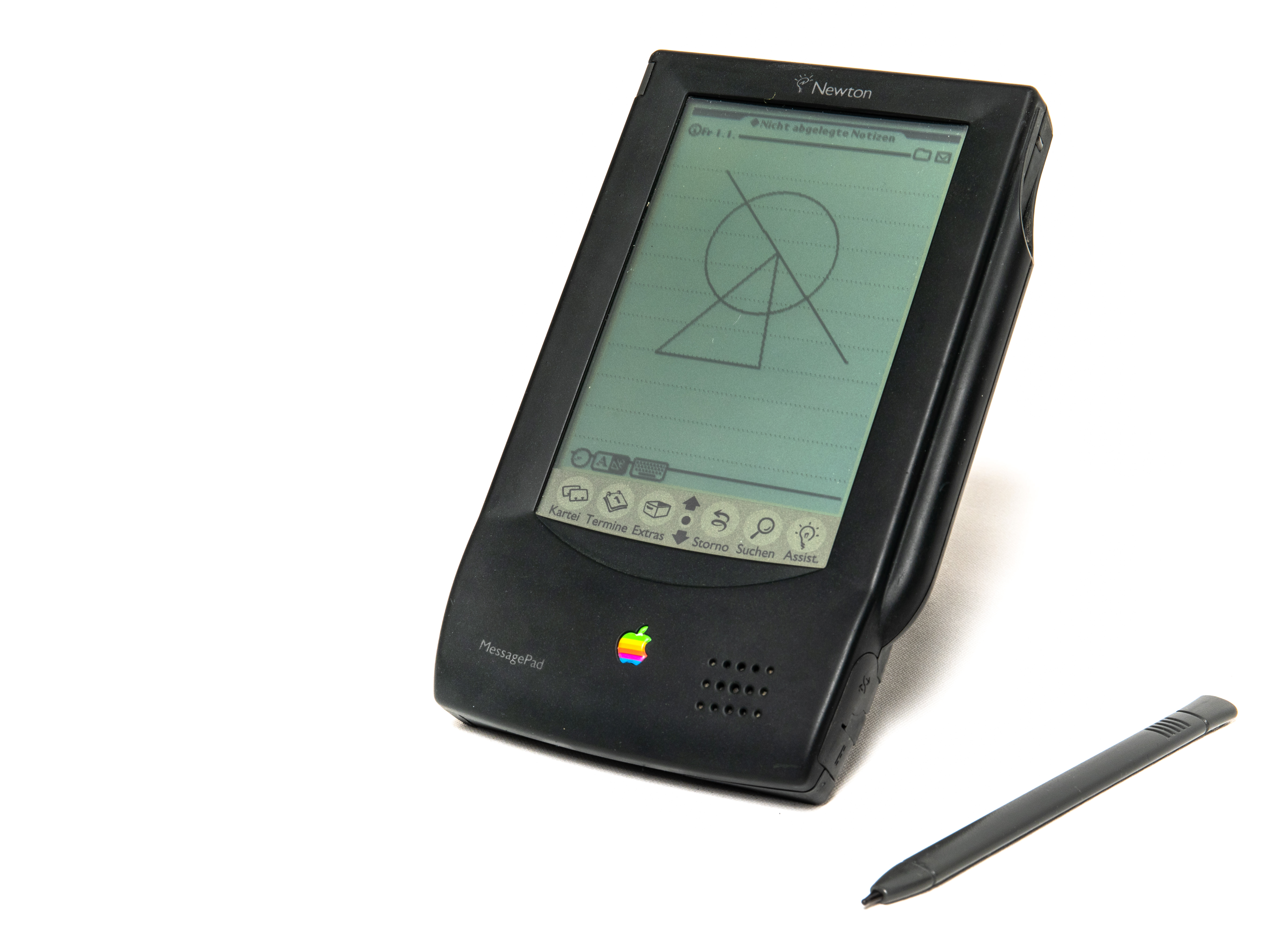
Apple Newton – MessagePad

In 1993, Apple Computer released the Apple Newton, with a 6-inch screen and 800 grams weight). It utilized Apple's own new Newton OS, initially running on hardware manufactured by Motorola and incorporating an ARM CPU, that Apple had specifically co-developed with Acorn Computers. The operating system and platform design were later licensed to Sharp and Digital Ocean, who went on to manufacture their own variants.

The Compaq Concerto was released in 1993 with a Compaq-modified version of MS-DOS 6.2 and Windows 3.1, a.k.a. Windows for PEN, with pen-entry and Wacom compatibility. Functionally the Concerto was a full featured laptop that could operate in pen-mode when the keyboard was removed.

In 1994 media company Knight Ridder made a concept video of a tablet device with a color display and a focus on media consumption. The company didn't create it as a commercial product because of deficiencies of weight and energy consumption in display technology.

In 1994, the European Union initiated the 'OMI-NewsPAD' project (EP9252), requiring a consumer device be developed for the receipt and consumption of electronically delivered news / newspapers and associated multi-media. The NewsPad name and project goals were borrowed from and inspired by Arthur C. Clarke's 1965 screen play and Stanley Kubrick's 1968 film: 2001: A Space Odyssey. Acorn Computers developed and delivered an ARM based touch screen tablet computer for this program, branded the NewsPad. The device was supplied for the duration of the Barcelona-based trial, which ended in 1997.

In 1996, The Webbook Company announced the first Internet-based tablet, then referred to as a Web Surfboard, that would run Java and utilize a RISC processor. However, it never went into production.

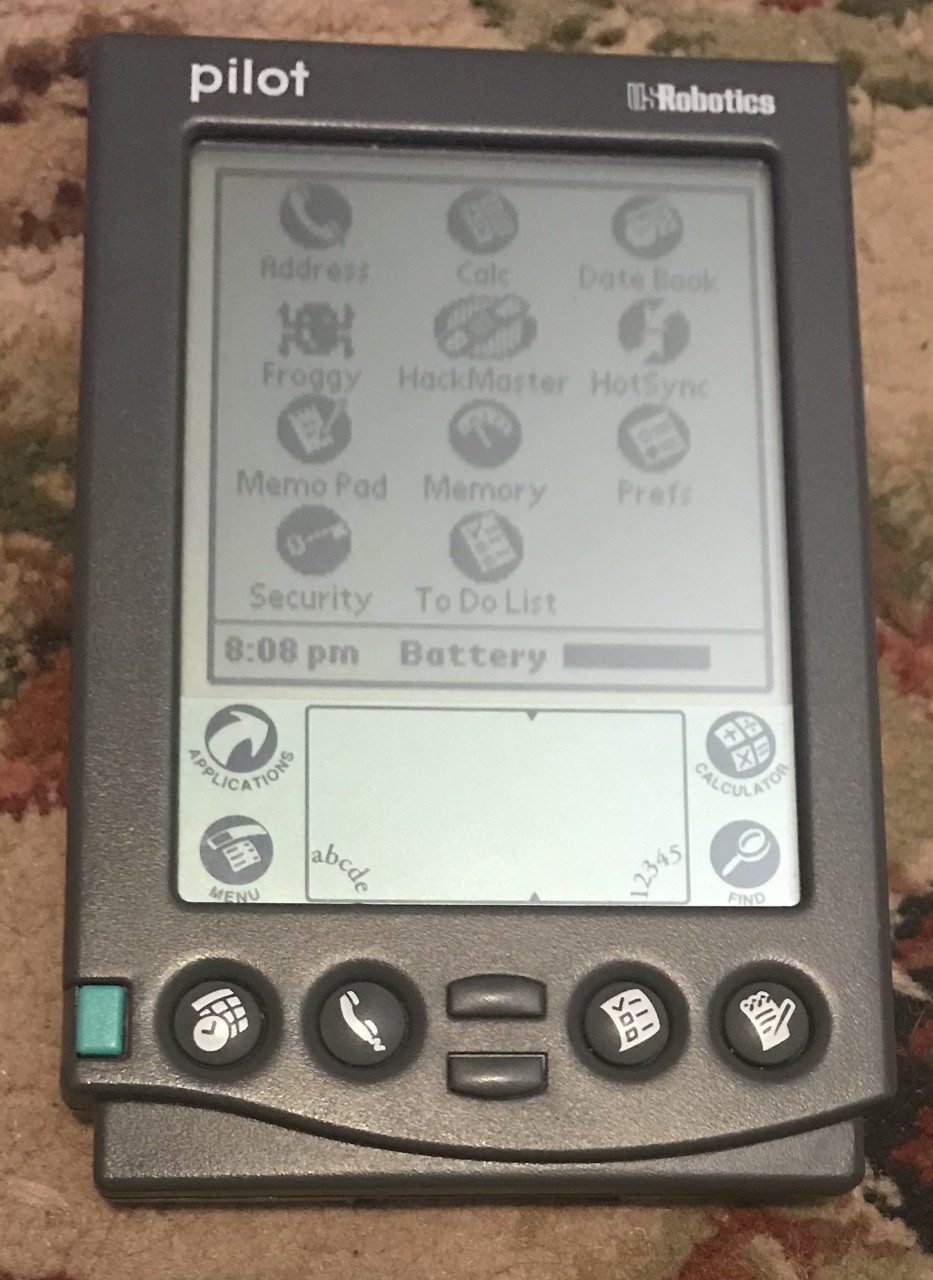
Palm Pilot 1000

Also in 1996, Palm, Inc. released the first of the Palm OS based PalmPilot touch and stylus based PDA, the touch based devices initially incorporating a Motorola Dragonball (68000) CPU.

Again in 1996, Fujitsu released the Stylistic 1000 tablet format PC, running Microsoft Windows 95, on a 100 MHz AMD486 DX4 CPU, with 8 MB RAM offering stylus input, with the option of connecting a conventional Keyboard and mouse.

In 1999, Intel announced a StrongARM based touch screen tablet computer under the name WebPAD, the tablet was later re-branded as the "Intel Web Tablet".

In April 2000, Microsoft launched the Pocket PC 2000, utilising their touch capable Windows CE 3.0 operating system. The devices were manufactured by several manufacturers, based on a mix of: x86, MIPS, ARM, and SuperH hardware.

One early implementation of a Linux tablet was the ProGear by FrontPath. The ProGear used a Transmeta chip and a resistive digitizer. The ProGear initially came with a version of Slackware Linux, but could later be bought with Windows 98.

=== Microsoft Tablet PC ===
In 1999, Microsoft attempted to re-institute the then decades old tablet concept by assigning two well-known experts in the field, from Xerox Palo Alto Research Center, to the project.

In 2000, Microsoft coined the term "Microsoft Tablet PC" for tablet computers built to Microsoft's specification, and running a licensed specific tablet enhanced version of its Microsoft Windows OS, popularizing the term tablet PC for this class of devices. Microsoft Tablet PCs were targeted to address business needs mainly as note-taking devices, and as rugged devices for field work. In the health care sector, tablet computers were intended for data capture – such as registering feedback on the patient experience at the bedside as well and supporting data collection through digital survey instruments.

In 2002, original equipment manufacturers released the first tablet PCs designed to the Microsoft Tablet PC specification. This generation of Microsoft Tablet PCs were designed to run Windows XP Tablet PC Edition, the Tablet PC version of Windows XP. This version of Microsoft Windows superseded Microsoft's earlier pen computing operating environment, Windows for Pen Computing 2.0. After releasing Windows XP Tablet PC Edition, Microsoft designed the successive desktop computer versions of Windows, Windows Vista and Windows 7, to support pen computing intrinsically.

Tablet PCs failed to gain popularity in the consumer space because of unresolved problems. The existing devices were too heavy to be held with one hand for extended periods, the specific software features designed to support usage as a tablet (such as finger and virtual keyboard support) were not present in all contexts, and there were not enough applications specific to the platform – legacy applications created for desktop interfaces made them not well adapted to the slate format.

=== Linux ===
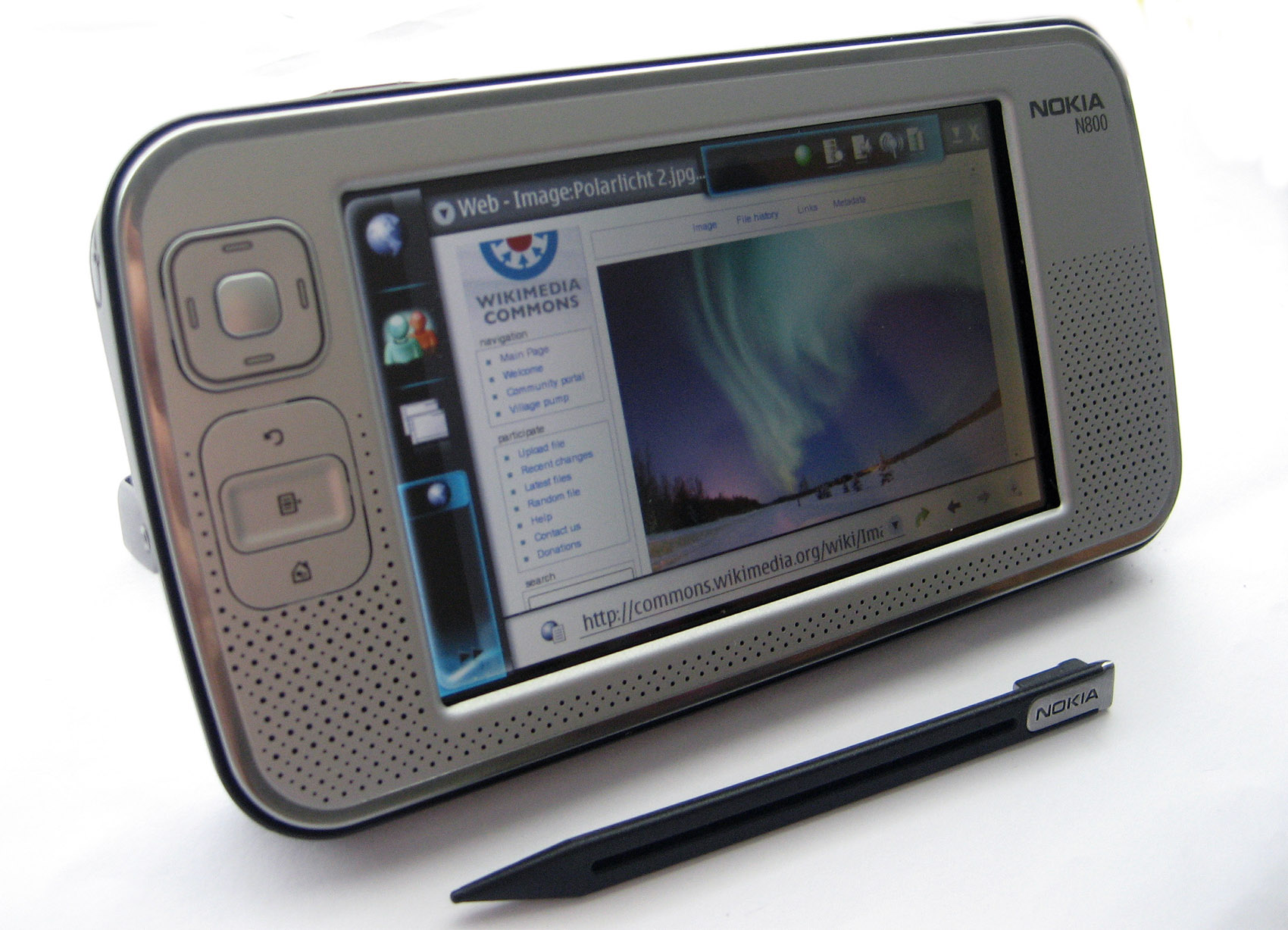
The Nokia N800

One early implementation of a Linux tablet was the ProGear by FrontPath, which used a Transmeta chip and a resistive digitizer. The ProGear initially came with a version of Slackware Linux, but could later be bought with Windows 98. Because these computers are general purpose IBM PC compatible machines, they can run a number of different operating systems. However, the device is discontinued and FrontPath ceased operations. Many touch screen sub-notebook computers can run any of several Linux distributions with little customizing.

X.org supports screen rotation and tablet input through Wacom drivers, and handwriting recognition software from both the Qt-based Qtopia and GTK+-based Internet Tablet OS provide promising free and open-source software systems for future development.

Open source note taking software in Linux includes applications such as Xournal (which supports PDF file annotation), Gournal (a Gnome-based note taking application), and the Java-based Jarnal (which supports handwriting recognition as a built-in function). Before the advent of the aforementioned software, a number of users had to rely on on-screen keyboards and alternative text input methods like Dasher. There is a stand-alone handwriting recognition program available, CellWriter, in which users must write letters separately in a grid.

Several Linux-based OS projects are dedicated to tablet PCs. All are open source, so they are freely available and can be run or ported to devices that conform to the tablet PC design. In 2003, Hitachi introduced the VisionPlate rugged tablet that was used as a point of sale device. Maemo (rebranded MeeGo in 2010), a Debian Linux based graphical user environment, was developed for the Nokia Internet Tablet devices (770, N800, N810 & N900). The Ubuntu Netbook Remix edition, and the Intel sponsored Moblin project, both with touchscreen support integrated into their user interfaces (UIs). Canonical Ltd began a program to better support tablets with the Unity UI for Ubuntu 10.10.

TabletKiosk offered a hybrid digitizer and touch device running openSUSE.

==== webOS ====
Initially developed by Palm, Inc. in January 2009, as the Palm OS, webOS was purchased by HP to be their proprietary operating system running on the Linux kernel. Versions 1.0 to 2.1 of webOS uses the patched Linux 2.6.24 kernel. HP has continued to develop the webOS platform for use in multiple products, including smartphones, tablet PCs, and printers. HP announced plans in March 2011, for a version of webOS by the end of 2011, to run within the Microsoft Windows operating system to be used in HP desktop and notebook computers in 2012.

HP TouchPad, the first addition to HP's tablet family, was shipped out with version 3.0.2. Version 3.0.2 gives the tablet support for multitasking, applications, and HP Synergy. HP have also claimed in its webcatalog to support over 200 apps with its release.

On 18 August 2011, HP announced that it would discontinue production of all webOS devices.

==== MeeGo ====
Nokia entered the tablet space with the Nokia 770 running Maemo, a Debian-based Linux distribution custom-made for their Nokia Internet Tablet line. The product line continued with the N900 which is the first to add phone capabilities. Intel, following the launch of the UMPC, started the Mobile Internet Device initiative, which took the same hardware and combined it with a Linux operating system custom-built for portable tablets. Intel co-developed the lightweight Moblin operating system following the successful launch of the Atom CPU series on netbooks.

MeeGo is an operating system developed by Intel and Nokia to support Netbooks, Smartphones and tablet PCs. In 2010, Nokia and Intel combined the Maemo and Moblin projects to form MeeGo. The first MeeGo powered tablet PC is the Neofonie WeTab. The WeTab uses an extended version of the MeeGo operating system called WeTab OS. WeTab OS adds runtimes for Android and Adobe AIR and provides a proprietary user interface optimized for the WeTab device.

=== Mac OS X Modbook ===
Apple has never sold a tablet PC computer running Mac OS X, although OS X does have support for handwriting recognition via Inkwell. However, Apple sells the iOS-based iPad Tablet computer, introduced in 2010.

Before the introduction of the iPad, Axiotron introduced the Modbook, a heavily modified Apple MacBook, Mac OS X-based tablet computer at Macworld in 2007. The Modbook used Apple's Inkwell handwriting and gesture recognition, and used digitization hardware from Wacom. To support the digitizer on the integrated tablet, the Modbook was supplied with a third-party driver called TabletMagic. Wacom does not provide drivers for this device.

== Apple's iPad ==
The tablet computer market was reinvigorated by Apple through the introduction of the iPad device in 2010. While the iPad places restrictions on the owner to install software thus deviating it from the PC tradition, its attention to detail for the touch interface is considered a milestone in the history of the development of the tablet computer that defined the tablet computer as a new class of portable device, different from a laptop PC or netbook. A WiFi-only model of the tablet was released in April 2010, and a WiFi+3G model was introduced about a month later, using a no-contract data plan from AT&T. Since then, the iPad 2 has launched, bringing 3G support from both AT&T and Verizon Wireless. The iPad has been characterized by some as a tablet computer that mainly focuses on media consumption such as web browsing, email, photos, videos, and e-reading, even though full-featured, Microsoft Office-compatible software for word processing (Pages), spreadsheets (Numbers), and presentations (Keynote) were released alongside the initial model. One month after the iPad's release Apple subsidiary FileMaker Inc. released a version of the Bento database software for it. With the introduction of the iPad 2 Apple also released full-featured first party software for multi-track music composition (GarageBand) and video editing (iMovie). As of the release of iOS 5 in October 2011, iPads no longer require being plugged into a separate personal computer for initial activation and backups, eliminating one of the drawbacks of using a non-PC architecture-based tablet computer.

On 20 May 2010, IDC published a press release defining the term media tablet as personal devices with screens from 7 to 12 inches, lightweight operating systems "currently based on ARM processors" which "provide a broad range of applications and connectivity, differentiating them from primarily single-function devices such as ereaders". IDC also predicted a market growth for tablets from 7.6 million units in 2010, to more than 46 million units in 2014. More recent reports show predictions from various analysts in the range from 26 to 64 million units in 2013. On 2 March 2011, Apple announced that 15 million iPads had been sold in three fiscal quarters of 2010, double the number that IDC then predicted.

== Other post-PC tablet computers ==
Early competitors to Apple's iPad in the market for tablet computers not based on the traditional PC architecture were the 5 inch Dell Streak, released in June 2010, the original 7 inch Samsung Galaxy Tab, released in September 2010. and the Fusion5 X220 Tablet PC, also released in September 2010.

At the Consumer Electronics Show in January 2011, over 80 new tablets were announced to compete with the iPad. Companies who announced tablets included: Dell with the Streak Tablet, Acer with the new Acer Tab, Motorola with its Xoom tablet (Android 3.0), Samsung with a new Samsung Galaxy Tab (Android 2.2), Research in Motion demonstrating their BlackBerry Playbook, Vizio with the Via Tablet, Toshiba with the Android 3.0 – run Toshiba Thrive, and others including Asus, and the startup company Notion Ink. Anumber of these tablets were designed to run Android 3.0 Honeycomb, Google's mobile operating system for tablets, while others run older versions of Android like 2.3, or a completely different OS such as the BlackBerry Playbook's QNX. Other than the Motorola Xoom, by the time most competitors released devices of comparable size and price to the original iPad, Apple in March 2011, had already released their second generation iPad 2.

Hewlett-Packard announced its TouchPad based on the WebOS system in June 2011. HP released it a month later in July, only to discontinue it after less than 49 days of sales, becoming the first casualty in the post-PC tablet computer market. The fire sale on TouchPad tablets when its price was dropped from US$499 to as low as $99 after it was discontinued resulted in a surge of interest. This dramatic increase in its popularity potentially raised its market share above all other non-Apple tablets, at least temporarily.

In September 2011, Amazon.com announced the Kindle Fire, a 7-inch tablet deeply tied into their Kindle ebook service, Amazon Appstore, and other Amazon services for digital music, video, and other content. The Kindle Fire runs on Amazon's custom fork of v2.3 of the Android operating system. Using Amazon's cloud services for accelerated web browsing and remote storage, Amazon has set it up to have very little other connection back to Google, aside from supporting Gmail as one of the several webmail services it can access. At a cost of only US$199 for the Kindle Fire it has been suggested that Amazon's business strategy is to make their money on selling content through it, as well as the device acting as a storefront for physical goods sold through Amazon. Besides the Kindle Fire's low price, reviewers have also noted that it is polished on its initial release, in comparison to other tablets that often needed software updates.

Despite the large number of competing tablets released in 2011, none of them had managed to gain considerable traction as the market continued to be dominated by the iPad and iPad 2. Several manufacturers had to resort to deep discounts to move excess inventory, as what happened with the HP TouchPad (after its announced discontinuation) and the BlackBerry Playbook. It has been suggested that multiple companies, in their rush to jump on the "tablet bandwagon", had released products that might have had decent hardware but lacked refinement and came with software bugs that needed updates.

== Post-PC tablet market share ==
According to IDC, Android have 63% of all "media tablet" sales in 2013 and rising and Windows is also rising in market share. Apple's iPad had 83% of all "media tablet" sales in 2010 and 28% of market share in 2013. At the unveiling of the iPad 2 in March 2011, Steve Jobs claimed that the iPad held more than 90% market share, but the difference between the figures could be explained by the difference between the amount of hardware shipped into the channel versus the number that have been actually sold.

Quarterly Market Shares by IDC
| Tablet OS | Percent |
| Apple iOS Q1 2011 | 65.7% |
| Apple iOS Q2 2011 | 68.3% |
| Google Android Q1 2011 | 34.0% |
| Google Android Q2 2011 | 26.8% |
| RIM QNX Q1 2011 | N/A |
| RIM QNX Q2 2011 | 4.9% |

In August 2011, the iPad and iPad 2 dominated sales, outselling Android and other rival OS tablets by a ratio of eight to one. Apple's iPad held 66 percent of the global tablet market in Q1 of 2011, but the share is predicted to drop to 58 percent by the end of the year due to the influx of new products, mostly Android tablets. Technology experts suggest that Apple is getting court injunctions to stop the slide, although these injunctions are only preliminary measures as Apple has to provide more substantial evidence in subsequent court proceedings that the design of competing products infringed its patents or copied their designs in order to make any bans permanent. These cases take months or even years to come to court, unless there is no settlement, and if Apple loses it will be liable for the business lost by a competitor due to the injunction. Although risky, experts say that this kind of strategy gives time for Apple to hold off rivals and grab even greater market share with their iPad, since it is a market that is developing fast where Apple leads, regardless of the damages that they have to pay if they lose the case. Google's David Drummond complained "They (Apple) want to make it harder for manufacturers to sell Android devices. Instead of competing by building new features or devices, they are fighting through litigation."

On 14 September 2011, IDC announced that in the second calendar quarter of 2011, the market share of the iPad increased to 68.3% from 65.7% in the previous quarter, while market share for Android-based tablets decreased from 34.0% the previous quarter down to 26.8% in the second quarter. Besides being affected by the introduction of the iPad 2 in March 2011, this can also be partially attributed to the introduction of RIM's PlayBook tablet, which took 4.9% share of the market in the quarter.

On 22 September 2011, Gartner lowered their forecast for sales of tablet computers based on the Android OS by 28 percent from the previous quarter's projection, explaining that "Android’s appeal in the tablet market has been constrained by high prices, weak user interface and limited tablet applications." Further, they state that they expect the iPad to have a "free run" through the 2011 holiday season and that Apple will "maintain a market share lead throughout our forecast period by commanding more than 50 percent of the market until 2014." Gartner revised their projection of Apple's worldwide tablet market share at the end of 2011, up to 73.4% after their previous projection of 68.7% for the year.

In October 2011, at the Launch Pad conference Ryan Block from gadget site gdgt showed slides identifying the makeup of the site's users who bought tablets in 2011 consisting of 76% iPad (39% iPad 2, 37% original iPad), 6% HP TouchPad, and no other tablet at over 4%. He noted that the numbers did not include previous purchases of the iPad or other tablets in 2010. In a breakdown by platform he showed a chart indicating Apple's iOS at 76%, Google's Android at 17%, HP's webOS at 6%, and RIM's PlayBook OS at 2%.

A report by Strategy Analytic showed that the share of Android tablet computers had risen sharply at the expense of Apple's iOS in the fourth quarter of 2011. According to Strategy Analytic, Android accounted for 39% of the global tablet market in the final three months of 2011, up from 29% a year earlier. Apple's share fell to 58% from 68%. A total of 26.8 million tablet computers were sold in the quarter, up from 10.7 million a year ago, the report said.

In China, according to an AlphaWise survey of 1,553 Chinese consumers across 16 cities over the summer of 2011, Apple's iPad currently holds a 65% share of that nation's tablet market. When asked about future purchases, 68% of those surveyed indicated an intent to buy an iPad, versus other brands' shares of 10% for Asus, 8% for Lenovo, 6% for Samsung, and 3% or less for any other brand.

According to eMarketer & Forbes, advertisers will spend nearly $1.23 billion on mobile advertising in 2011 in the US, up from $743 million last year. By 2015, the US mobile advertising market is set to reach almost $4.4 billion. This includes spending on display ads (such as banners, rich media and video), search and messaging-based advertising, and covers ads viewed on both mobile phones and tablets.

== Timeline ==
=== Before 1950 ===
- 1888: U.S. Patent granted to Elisha Gray on electrical stylus device for capturing handwriting.
- 1914: U.S. Patent on handwriting recognition user interface with a stylus.
- 1942: U.S. Patent on touchscreen for handwriting input.
- 1945: Vannevar Bush proposes the Memex, a data archiving device including handwriting input, in an essay As We May Think.

=== 1950s ===
- Tom Dimond demonstrates the Stylator electronic tablet with pen for computer input and software for recognition of handwritten text in real-time.

=== 1960s ===
Wireless tablet device portrayed in the film 2001: A Space Odyssey (1968)

- Early 1960s
  - RAND Tablet invented. The RAND Tablet is better known than the Styalator, but was invented later.
- 1961
  - Stanislaw Lem describes an Opton, a portable device with a screen "linked directly, through electronic catalogs, to templates of every book on earth" in the 1961 novel "Return from the Stars".
- 1966
  - In the science fiction television series Star Trek, crew members carry large, wedge-shaped electronic clipboards, operated through the use of a stylus.
- 1968
  - Filmmaker Stanley Kubrick portrays a flatscreen tablet device wirelessly playing a video broadcast in the film 2001: A Space Odyssey.

=== 1970s ===
- 1971
  - Touchscreen interface developed at SLAC.
- 1972
  - Alan Kay of Xerox PARC publishes: "A personal computer for children of all ages" describing and detailing possible uses for his Dynabook concept. However, the device was never built.
- 1978
  - The Hitchhiker's Guide to the Galaxy is broadcast as a radio comedy on BBC Radio 4. The series was named after a fictional touch screen electronic tablet used in the play.

=== 1980s ===
- 1982
  - Pencept of Waltham, Massachusetts markets a general-purpose computer terminal using a tablet and handwriting recognition instead of a keyboard and mouse.
  - Cadre System markets the Inforite point-of-sale terminal using handwriting recognition and a small electronic tablet and pen.
- 1985
  - Pencept and CIC both offer PC computers for the consumer market using a tablet with handwriting recognition instead of a keyboard and mouse. Operating system is MS-DOS.
- 1986
  - Hindsight develops and tests the Letterbug, an educational tablet computer before making the trade show tour in 1987.
- 1987
  - The Knowledge Navigator concept piece by Apple Computer.
  - Linus Technologies releases the Linus Write-Top
- 1989
  - The first commercially successful tablet-type portable MS-DOS computer was the GridPad from Grid Systems.
  - Wang Laboratories introduces Freestyle, an application that captured a screen from a MS-DOS application, and let users add voice and handwriting annotations. It was a sophisticated predecessor to later note-taking applications for systems like tablet computers.

=== 1990s ===
- 1991
  - The Momenta Pentop was released.
  - GO Corporation announced a dedicated operating system, called PenPoint OS, with control of the operating system desktop via handwritten gesture shapes.
  - NCR released model 3125 pen computer running MS-DOS, Penpoint OS or Pen Windows.
  - The Apple Newton entered development; although it ultimately became a PDA, its original concept (which called for a larger screen and greater sketching abilities) resembled the hardware of a tablet computer.
- 1992
  - GO Corporation shipped the PenPoint OS for general availability and IBM announced IBM 2125 pen computer (the first IBM model named "ThinkPad") in April.
  - Microsoft releases Windows for Pen Computing as a response to the PenPoint OS by GO Corporation.
  - Samsung introduced the PenMaster which used Windows for Pen Computing from Microsoft
- 1993
  - Apple announces the Newton PDA, also known as the Apple MessagePad, which includes handwriting recognition with a stylus.
  - IBM releases the ThinkPad, IBM's first commercialized portable tablet computer product available to the consumer market, as the IBM ThinkPad 750P and 360P.
  - BellSouth released the IBM Simon Personal Communicator, an analog cellphone using a touchscreen and display. It did not include handwriting recognition, but did permit users to write messages and send them as faxes on the analog cellphone network, and included PDA and email features.
  - AT&T introduced the EO Personal Communicator combining PenPoint with wireless communications.
- 1994
  - Knight Ridder concept video of a tablet device with focus on media consumption.
  - Sony introduces Magic Link PDA based on Magic Cap operating system.
- 1995
  - Hewlett Packard releases the MS-DOS and PEN/GEOS based OmniGo 100 and OmniGo 120 handheld organizers with flip-around clamshell display with pen support and Graffiti handwriting recognition.
- 1996
  - The Digital Equipment Corporation releases the DEC Lectrice.
  - Acorn Computers supply ARM-based touch screen tablets for the NewsPad pilot in Barcelona, Spain.
- 1997
  - The first Palm Pilot introduced.
- 1998
  - Cyrix-NatSemi announce and demonstrate the WebPad touch screen tablet computer at COMDEX.
- 1999
  - The "QBE" pen computer created by Aqcess Technologies wins COMDEX Best of Show.
  - Intel announces a StrongARM-based, wireless touch screen tablet computer called the WebPad, the device was later renamed the "Intel Web Tablet".

=== 2000s ===
- 2000
  - PaceBlade develops the first device that meets the Microsoft's Tablet PC standard and received the "Best Hardware" award at VAR Vision 2000.
  - The "QBE Vivo" pen computer created by Aqcess Technologies ties for COMDEX Best of Show.
  - Bill Gates of Microsoft demonstrates the first public prototype of a Tablet PC (defined by Microsoft as a pen-enabled computer conforming to hardware specifications devised by Microsoft and running a licensed copy of the "Windows XP Tablet PC Edition" operating system) at COMDEX.
- 2002
  - Microsoft releases the Microsoft Tablet PC, designed and built by HP.
  - Motion Computing releases their 1st slate Tablet PC the M1200.
- 2003
  - PaceBlade receives the "Innovation des Jahres 2002/2003" award for the PaceBook Tablet PC from PC Professional Magazine at the CeBIT.
  - Fingerworks develops the touch technology and touch gestures later used in the Apple iPhone.
  - Motion Computing releases their 2nd slate Tablet PC the M1300.
- 2005
  - Nokia launches the Nokia 770 Internet Tablet.
  - Motion Computing releases the LE1600 and paperback sized LS800 Tablet PC.
- 2006
  - Windows Vista released for general availability. Vista included the functionality of the special Tablet PC edition of Windows XP.
  - On Disney Channel Original Movie, Read It and Weep, Jamie uses a Tablet PC for her journal.
  - MTVs "Pimp My Ride" features multiple Motion Computing tablets PCs in customized automobiles
- 2007
  - Axiotron launches the Modbook, the first (and also only) tablet PC series based on Mac hardware and Mac OS X at Macworld.
  - Archos launches Archos 605 WiFi, a PMP with WiFi. Virtually a tablet PC.
  - Apple launches iPod Touch, an MP3 player with WiFi. It took Apple two years to turn this concept into a tablet PC.
- 2008
  - In April 2008, as part of a larger federal court case, the gesture features of the Windows/Tablet PC operating system and hardware were found to infringe on a patent by GO Corp. concerning user interfaces for pen computer operating systems. Microsoft's acquisition of the technology is the subject of a separate lawsuit.
  - HP releases the second multi-touch capable tablet: the HP TouchSmart tx2 series.
- 2009
  - Asus announces a tablet netbook, the Eee PC T91 and T91MT, the latter with a multi-touch screen.
  - Always Innovating announced a new tablet netbook with an ARM CPU.
  - Motion Computing launched the J3400.

=== 2010s ===
- 2010
  - Apple unveils the iPad, running iOS in March.
  - Fusion Garage releases the JooJoo, running Linux.
  - Samsung unveils the Galaxy Tab, running Android.
  - Fusion5 releases A1CS X220 Android 2.1 Tablet PC.
  - Neofonie releases the WeTab, a MeeGo-based slate tablet PC, featuring an 11.6 inch multi-touch screen at 1366×768 pixels resolution.
  - Dixons Retail unveils the Advent Vega, a 10-inch tablet PC running Android 2.2, having a micro SD card slot, a USB port and a 16h battery life for audio playback and 6.5h for 1080p video.
  - HP releases the Slate 500, running a full-version of Windows 7.
- 2011
  - Motorola releases Xoom, a 10-inch tablet running Android 3.0 (Honeycomb).
  - BlackBerry releases BlackBerry Playbook running BlackBerry Tablet OS, based on QNX Neutrino.
  - Asus releases the Asus Eee Pad Transformer TF101, one of the first 2-in-1 detachable tablets
  - Dell showcases the Streak 7 tablet at CES 2011 in January.
  - ZTE announces the ZTE V11 and the Z-pad that both run Android 3.0 (Honeycomb).
  - Apple released the iPad 2.
  - Toshiba announces the Toshiba Tablet, a 10-inch tablet powered by a Tegra 2 process and Android 3.0 (Honeycomb)
  - HP releases the HP TouchPad with webOS & withdraws it in August 2011 (a month later).
  - Amazon announced an Android-based tablet, the Kindle Fire, in September.
  - Barnes & Noble introduces Nook Tablet in November.
- 2012
  - Apple releases the iPad 3, and then later in the year iPad 4 and the iPad Mini.
  - Google unveiled the Nexus 7, a 7-inch tablet developed by Asus and the Nexus 10, a 10-inch tablet developed by Samsung.
  - Samsung releases Samsung Galaxy Note 10.1, with stylus apps, running Android 4.0 (Ice Cream Sandwich) with 1.4 GHz quad-core CPU.
  - Microsoft releases the Surface RT with an ARM microprocessor and kickstand.
- 2013
  - Sony releases the Sony Xperia Tablet Z as well as having Ingress Protection Ratings of IP55 and IP57, making it dust-resistant, water-jet resistant, and waterproof.
  - Apple releases the iPad Air and the iPad Mini 2 in November (first 64-bit tablets with iPhone 5S smartphone being the first 64-bit mobile device the month before)
  - Microsoft releases the Surface 2 with an ARM microprocessor and two step Kickstand. Alongside the Surface Pro 2 was released with an Intel core I5 processor.
- 2014
  - Samsung releases a 2014 version of the Samsung Galaxy Note 10.1
  - Microsoft releases the Surface Pro 3
  - Nvidia releases the Shield Tablet, an Android tablet focused on gaming
  - Google releases the Nexus 9 (first 64-bit Android tablet)
  - Apple releases the iPad Air 2.
  - HP ships first 64-bit Windows 8.1 tablets with Intel Atom
- 2015
  - Android and Windows tablets (and smartphones) are up to 4 GB RAM, using 64-bit processors.
  - Microsoft released fourth generation of the Surface Pro, the Surface Pro 4 and 2-in-1 convertible tablet that could be folded like a laptop called the Surface Book, both came with the sixth generation Skylake Intel processors.
  - Apple released the iPad Pro, being one of the largest tablet devices ever made. It features a 12.9-inch display. It also released accessories at the same time such as its first tablet point device, the Apple Pencil.
- 2016
  - Apple released the iPad Pro in a 9.7-inch display that had a 256 GB option, the largest amount of storage available on a consumer tablet.
- 2017
  - Apple released the fifth generation iPad, its lowest cost 9.7-inch tablet. One reviewer said the tablet is "perfect for first-time tablet buyers".

== See also ==
- Comparison of tablet computers
- Graphics tablet
- Pen computing
- Personal digital assistant
- Smartbook
- Tablet computer
- Ultra-mobile PC
- Microsoft Tablet PC
