= Jerry Kaplan =

American computer scientist

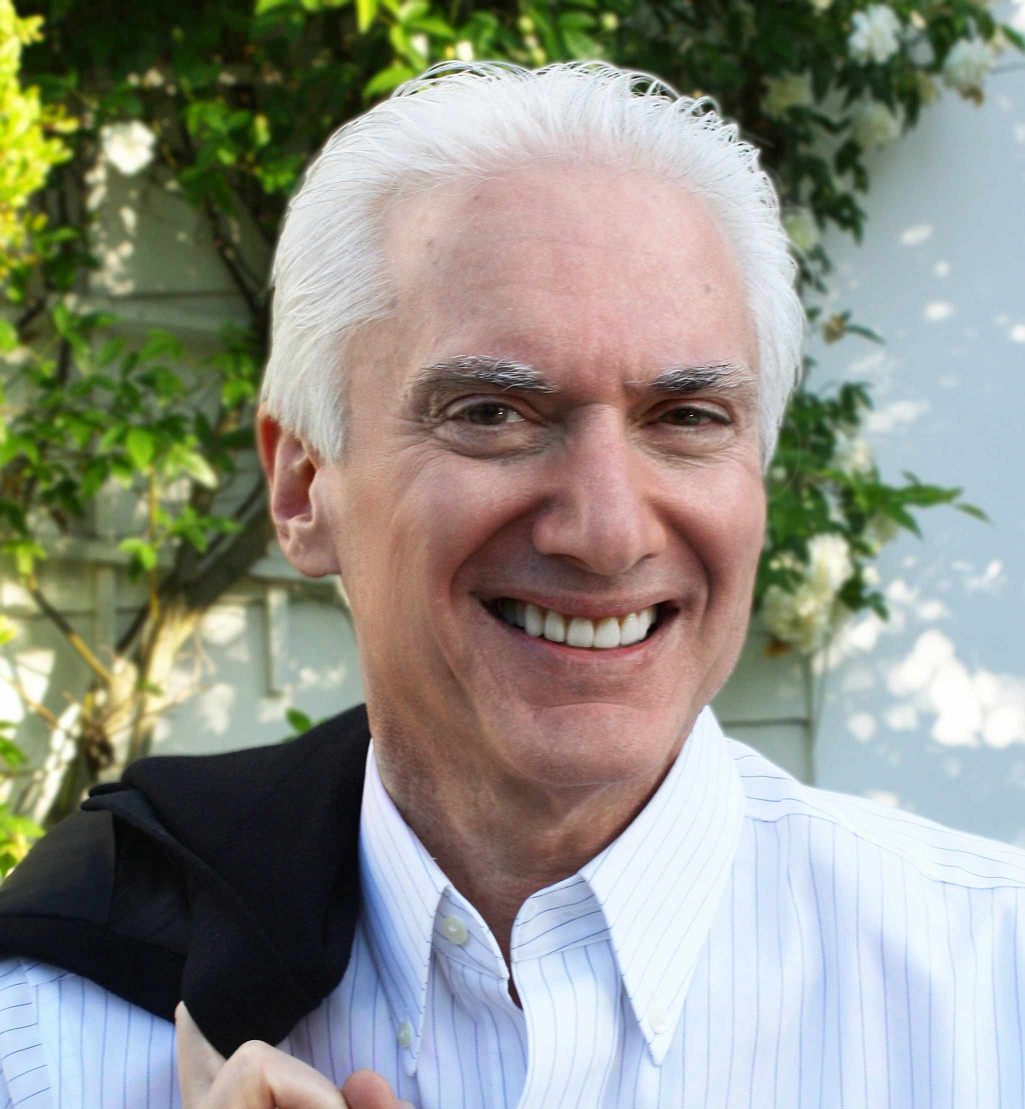
- Born: Samuel Jerrold Kaplan; March 25, 1952 (age 74); White Plains, New York
- Education: Doctorate in Computer and Information Science
- Alma mater: University of Pennsylvania; University of Chicago
- Occupations: Entrepreneur, author, Futurist
- Known for: Founder of GO Corporation; Author of "Startup: A Silicon Valley Adventure”
- Board member of: GO Corporation; Onsale, Inc. Winster, Inc.

Samuel Jerrold "Jerry" Kaplan (born March 25, 1952) is an American computer scientist, author, futurist, and entrepreneur. He is best known for his work on pen computing and tablet computers. He is the founder of numerous companies, including GO Corporation, whose technology was used to develop the first smartphone and tablet PC. Kaplan is the co-founder of OnSale, the first B2C online auction site launched in 1994, five months prior to eBay. He is a recipient of the 1998 Ernst & Young Emerging Entrepreneur of the Year Award and author of the book Startup: A Silicon Valley Adventure. Kaplan is also the author of the 2015 book Humans Need Not Apply: A Guide to Wealth and Work in the Age of Artificial Intelligence. Additional companies he has co-founded include artificial intelligence company Teknowledge, Inc. and social game website Winster.com. Kaplan was briefly a Fellow at the Stanford Center for Legal Informatics.

== Early life and education ==
Kaplan attended the University of Chicago where he received a bachelor's degree in history and philosophy of science in 1972. He then studied computer science at the University of Pennsylvania where he graduated in 1979 with a Doctorate in computer and information science.

== Career ==
While at the University of Pennsylvania, Kaplan wrote the software for the first all-digital keyboard instrument, the Synergy, sold by Digital Keyboards, Inc. In 1980. The Synergy was used by Wendy Carlos to compose Digital Moonscapes. After graduating from the University of Pennsylvania, Kaplan joined the computer science department at Stanford University. He was a research associate with Stanford between 1979 and 1981. While at Stanford he wrote the database backend for the first personal computer natural language query system that became the first product of Symantec, called Q&A. In 1981 he co-founded the company Teknowledge, Inc., a publicly traded artificial intelligence company. Kaplan was hired by Lotus Development Corporation to develop and design software based on Al techniques, working as the company's principal technologist. While at Lotus he developed Lotus Agenda, an early DOS-based personal information manager along with Ed Belove and Mitchell Kapor. He got the idea for another venture while riding in a plane with Kapor and discussing computer technology and the need for a notebook type computer. This idea led to the founding of GO Corporation.

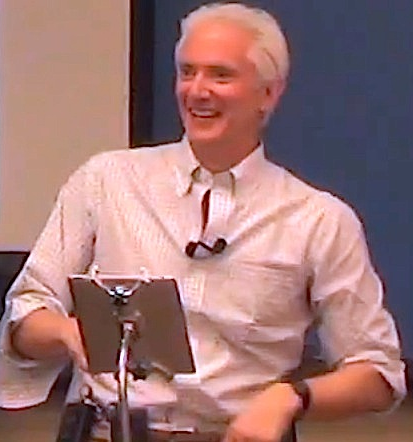
Jerry Kaplan lecturing at Stanford University in 2013

Kaplan co-founded GO Corporation in 1987. He believed the next generation of computers would be hand-held digital notepads which people would use a pen to write on the screen instead of typing. The company focused on developing a new type of operating system for tablet computers with touch sensitive screens. The flagship product of GO Corporation, which survived the company by many years, was PenPoint, winner of Byte Magazine's Byte Award for best operating system 1992. Go Corporation was a well-funded startup focused on pen computer technology. The technology developed by the company was a precursor to early portable computers including the Palm Pilot and the Apple Newton, and most recently in iOS products such as Apple's iPad. AT&T Corporation became a major investor in the company, using GO's technology to develop the EO Personal Communicator, the world's first smart phone. GO Corporation was later sold to AT&T Corporation. Kaplan later authored Startup: A Silicon Valley Adventure, a book about the history of the company in which he details his experience with company investors as well as pitching the idea to Microsoft and Apple who began to develop their own tablets as opposed to investing in GO. The book was selected as one of the Top Ten Business Books of the Year by Businessweek and was translated into Chinese, Japanese and Portuguese.

Kaplan is also the co-founder of OnSale, an online auction website that he co-founded in 1994 and launched in 1995, five months prior to eBay. The site was one of the busiest in the mid-1990s with approximately 2 million hits per day. OnSale auctioned items primarily in the computer sector, namely products from manufacturers that included AT&T, Apple, Packard-Bell, Sony, Compaq, and Dell. In 1996, Kaplan announced that he would be taking the company public. The company expanded its offerings to include sporting goods, jewelry, clothing, artwork, electronics and specialty foods. The company was later purchased by Egghead Software in 1999 for $400 million. Kaplan's original patents for OnSale were later acquired by eBay and Amazon.com.

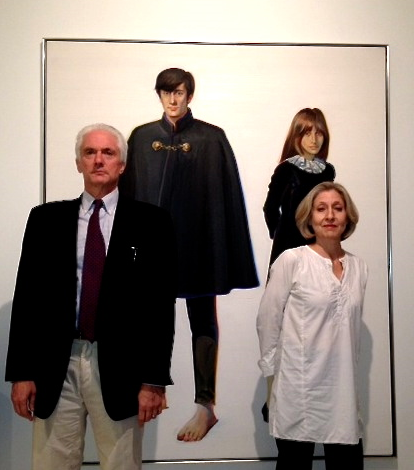
Jerry and Amy Kaplan standing in front of the 1964 oil on canvas painting by Wayne Thiebaud, Amy and Jerrold, Children of the Sixties

In 2004, Kaplan launched a new venture called Winster, Inc., a social gaming website with multi-player casual games. Players on the site are encouraged to work with other players to win as opposed to competing against each other, creating a social community leading to friendship amongst players. It received its first funding from U.S. Venture Partners in 2007 and received a total of $5 million in funding as of 2011. Kaplan is still involved with Stanford University, the school where he began his career. He is a Fellow at The Stanford Center for Legal Informatics and teaches History and Philosophy of Artificial Intelligence in the Computer Science Department.

Kaplan is interviewed in the 2018 documentary on artificial intelligence, Do You Trust This Computer?

== Personal life ==
Kaplan and his sister Amy Kaplan Eckman are the subject of a 1964 oil-on-canvas painting by Wayne Thiebaud. The painting is titled Amy and Jerrold, Children of the Sixties and was commissioned by their mother Muriel Kaplan. He is also involved in philanthropy and in 1998 donated $250,000 to The Robert and Mary Montgomery Armory Art Center in West Palm Beach, Florida in honor of his mother Muriel Kaplan, a former sculpture instructor at the center. Kaplan made a $500,000 gift to the University of Pennsylvania School of Engineering and Applied Science in 2001, to endow a chair in honor of faculty member Aravind K. Joshi. He is married to Michelle Kaplan and has four daughters.
