= Alain Rossmann =

French entrepreneur

- Born: 1956 (age 69–70)
- Education: École Polytechnique; École Nationale des Ponts et Chaussées; Stanford University
- Occupations: Engineer, entrepreneur, executive
- Spouse: Joanna Hoffman
- Children: 2

Alain Simon Rossmann (born 1956) is a French entrepreneur who was a member of the early Apple Macintosh team and who went on to found or co-found nine startups, of which three went public (Radius, C-Cube Microsystems, Unwired Planet), three were acquired (EO by AT&T, Vudu by Walmart, PSS Systems by IBM), and two were dissolved (Zonbu, Klip). The ninth is his current company, Machinify.

== Education ==
In 1979, Rossmann graduated at the École Polytechnique with a BS in mathematics and physics. He completed an MS in civil engineering at École Nationale des Ponts et Chaussées in 1981 and an MBA from Stanford University in 1983.

== Career ==
Rossmann was head evangelist at the Macintosh division of Apple Computer from 1983 to 1986. He worked with Joanna Hoffman and the couple subsequently married. Next, he founded Radius, a company that built Macintosh peripherals.

He was vice-president of marketing and sales from 1986 to 1989. Its IPO was in 1990. He was vice-president of operations of C-Cube Microsystems, a leading developer of MPEG integrated circuits, from 1989 to 1992. Its IPO was in 1994. It was acquired by LSI Logic in 2001.

Moving into pen computing, Rossmann was CEO of EO from 1992 to 1994. It built and marketed the EO Personal Communicator. It was acquired by AT&T in 1993. With his colleague Celeste Baranski, he won the Discover Award from Discover Magazine in 1993 for this product. In an early smartphone development, he was founder and CEO of Unwired Planet (later renamed Phone.com, then Openwave, then back to Unwired Planet) from 1994 to 2001. It developed the Wireless Application Protocol for smartphone microbrowsers. Its IPO was in 1999.

After Unwired Planet, he was founder and CEO then chairman of PSS Systems, an information lifecycle governance company, from June 2001 to October 2010. It was acquired by IBM in 2010. His online movie service, Vudu, was acquired by Walmart. He was founder and CEO from June 2005 to March 2010. Next Rossmann was founder and chairman of Zonbu, subscription-based personal computer maker, from April 2006 to December 2007.

From March 2011 to January 2015 he worked at Klip, Inc., a social video start up, as founder and CEO.
