= Robert Nadeau =

Robert Nadeau may refer to:

- Robert Nadeau (aikidoka) (born 1937), American aikido teacher
- Robert Nadeau (science historian) (born 1944), American professor of English at George Mason University
