= Celeste Baranski =

American engineer and entrepreneur

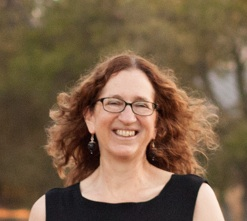
- Celeste Baranski, July 2013
- Born: 1957 (age 68–69)
- Education: Stanford University
- Occupations: Electronic engineer, entrepreneur, executive

Celeste Suzanne Baranski is an American electronic engineer, entrepreneur, and executive who helped create several pioneering electronic devices including early versions of the tablet computer. Baranski, with her colleague Alain Rossmann, won the Discover Award from Discover Magazine in 1993.

== Education ==
Baranski attended Stanford University from 1975 to 1980 and obtained Bachelor of Science and Master of Science degrees in electrical engineering.

== Career ==
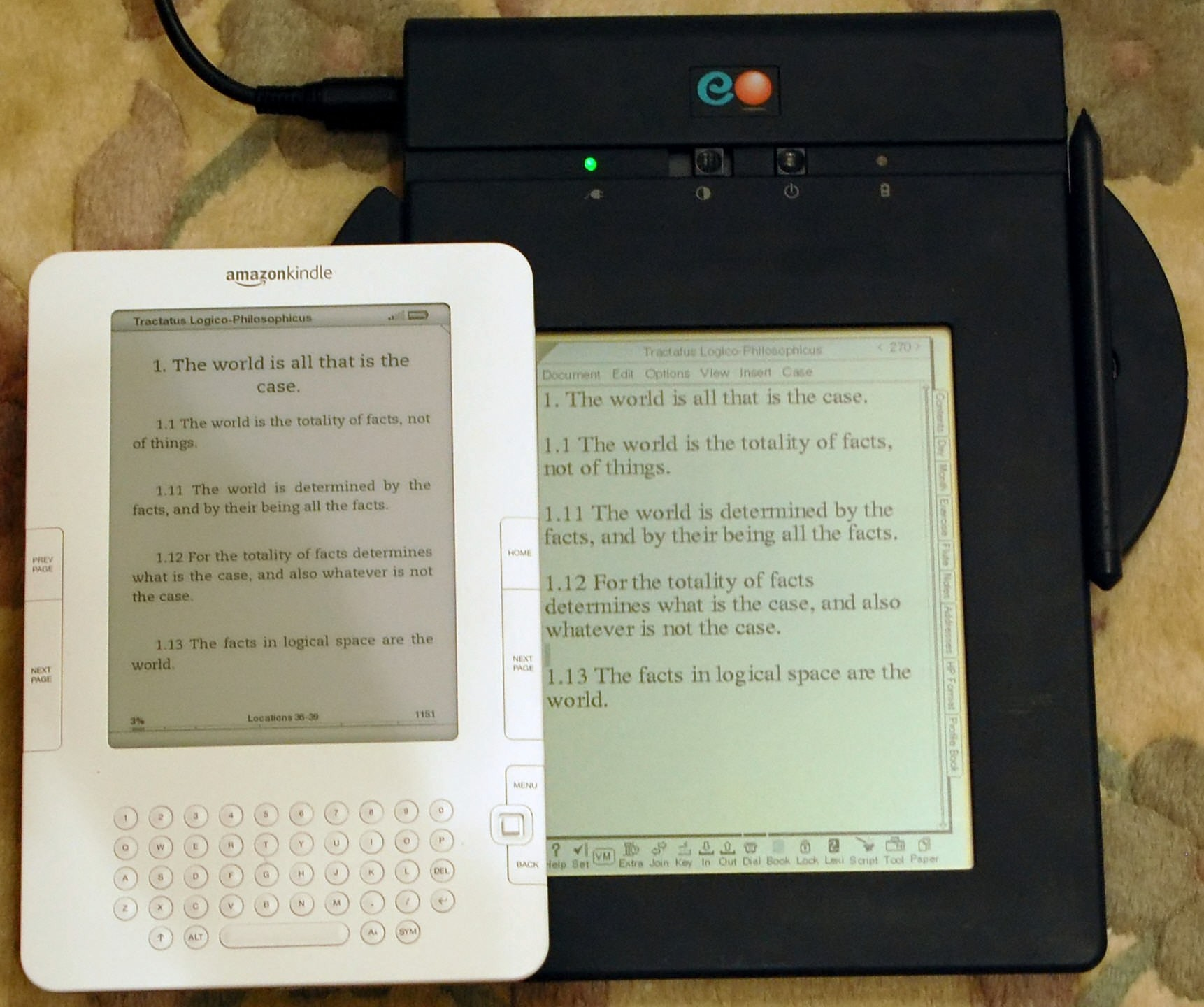
Comparison of the EO 440 Personal Communicator (1993) and the Amazon Kindle 2 e-book reader (2009). Both have reflective displays (no backlight). The EO has liquid crystal display, the Kindle an electrophoretic one.

After engineering jobs at ROLM, GRiD Systems, and Tsunami Technologies, Baranski joined GO Corporation in 1987 as one of the founders, and served as Vice President of Engineering. In 1990, the hardware division of GO was divested as EO Inc. and she continued there from 1990 to 1994, producing the EO Personal Communicator, an early tablet computer. The device did not enjoy commercial success so after the collapse of Go/EO, she worked from 1994 to 2006 on mobile devices at Norand Corporation, Hewlett Packard, Set Engineering, Handspring, and Palm.

After taking a sabbatical she founded Vitamin D Video, a machine vision company, in 2007 and served as its chief executive officer until 2010. The company licensed artificial intelligence algorithms from Numenta, a company founded by Jeff Hawkins whom she met at Handspring/Palm. It was acquired by Sighthound in 2013.

From 2010 to 2014 she was senior vice president, engineering, at Panasas, a data storage company.

In 2014 she joined Hawkins' machine intelligence company, Numenta, as Vice President of Engineering.
