= Linus Write-Top =

Model of tablet computer

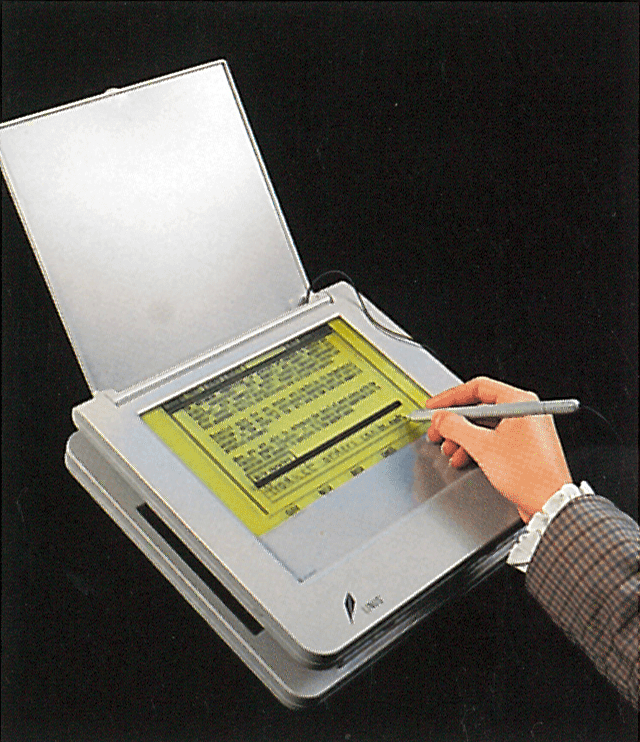
- Developer: Ralph Sklarew; Robert Nadeau
- Manufacturer: Linus Technologies
- Type: Tablet computer
- Released: July 1988; 37 years ago
- Lifespan: 1988–1990
- Discontinued: February 1990; 36 years ago
- Units sold: About 1,500
- Media: 3.5-inch floppy disks (5.25-inch floppy disks optional, external)
- CPU: NEC V20 at 7.16 MHz
- Memory: 640 KB – 2 MB static RAM
- Display: 9.4-inch monochrome transflective STN LCD
- Graphics: CGA, 640 × 200 pixels

The Linus Write-Top is an early tablet computer first released by Linus Technologies, Inc., of Reston, Virginia, in July 1988. It was the first tablet computer released to the public with support for pen input and handwriting recognition software. The Write-Top is compatible with software for the IBM PC and runs an Intel 8088–compatible microprocessor. Although innovative, the Write-Top was a commercial flop, and Linus Technologies folded less than two years after its introduction.

== Development ==
Brochure and spec sheet for the Linus Write-Top, from 1988

Linus Technologies, Inc., was established in 1985 in Reston, Virginia, by Ralph Sklarew, Robert Nadeau, and Arthur Rodbell. The company was founded chiefly to market the Write-Top, which was largely the brainchild of Sklarew and Nadeau. Before founding Linus, Sklarew had worked as a developer of environmental monitoring systems for institutions such as NASA and has founded a company that marketed such systems for chemical plants in 1977. Nadeau, meanwhile, was a professor of English at George Mason University who was next-door neighbors with Sklarew in Virginia. In the early 1980s, Sklarew discovered that Nadeau had been working on a prototype for an electronic book reader in his home and expressed interest in developing the concept further into a commercial product. The two developed a system for digitizing handwriting for the IBM PC programmed in GW-BASIC, eventually delivering a prototype to venture capitalists. Development stalled for a year and a half until the duo met Arthur Rodbell, who had experience in raising seed capital and marketing for various companies. In late 1984, the three raised $11 million in funding from Venture First of Winston-Salem, North Carolina, and in early 1985, Linus Technologies was founded. In 1986, the company hired Richard Mier, the recently departed vice president of marketing of Atari Corporation, to become Linus' president and CEO.

Sklarew, Nadeau, and others spent several years developing the Write-Top, with the final execution rendered by the industrial designer Peter H. Muller of Inter4m. Originally devised as a single-piece device, the final Write-Top was ultimately built out of two pieces, the system unit and the pen-enabled display; however, the two can be latched together to approximate a self-contained tablet.

== Specifications ==
The Write-Top measures 11 by 11 by 3.5 inches (279 by 279 by 89 mm) and weighs roughly 9 pounds (4.1 kg) (when equipped with several options). The Write-Top runs the Intel 8088–compatible NEC V20 microprocessor, clocked at 7.16 MHz, and contains 640 KB of static RAM, upgradable to 2 MB with an optional, proprietary SRAM card. Besides containing the motherboard, the system unit includes a serial port, a parallel port, an PC keyboard port, a removable 3.5-inch floppy disk drive, a port for an optional external 5.25-inch floppy disk drive, and a slot for an optional 1200-baud modem. The pen-capable screen unit houses a monochrome transflective STN LCD, measuring 8 inches by 5 inches and capable of displaying CGA graphics at a resolution of 640 by 200 pixels. Aside from using natural light to evenly illuminate the display, the LCD also features a backlight. The Write-Top comes shipped with the MS-DOS 3.30 operating system on floppy.

As a tablet computer, the Write-Top features no built-in physical keyboard. Instead, overlaid on top of the LCD is a glass layer that allows the computer to be controlled using a stylus of nearly any material, including a mechanical pencil. To input text into a given application, the Write-Top features a terminate-and-stay-resident program called Your-Write that takes the user's handwriting (either as single letters or a sequence of words (Note: Letterforms cannot overlap or connect with each other, as in cursive writing.)) via a field at the bottom of the screen and interprets it as textual information, outputting ASCII text into the currently open application. The software reserves a number of specialized symbols representing commands such as deletion of the word at the position of the text cursor and copying and pasting. Users can also select blocks of text using the pen and move them around freely by hand. When loaded into the operating system, Your-Write occupies 40 KB of RAM. The user must provide multiple samples of their handwriting for training the algorithm when loading Your-Write; in order to generate a robust dataset of the user's handwriting, this training module takes approximately 30 minutes to complete.

Linus also shipped with the computer an 80-column word processor called Just-Write, which is specifically optimized for Your-Write. Besides Your-Write and Just-Write, Linus also sold separately Code-Write, a software development kit for programmers wanting to create software with the same handwriting recognition algorithm as Your-Right. (Note: Third-party developers intereseted in developing for the Write-Top had to pay Linus $5000 in licensing and patent fees.) Besides these titles by Linus, the Write-Top is compatible with the vast majority of IBM PC software.

== Release and reception ==
The Write-Top was publicly unveiled in March 1988. Following FCC Class B approval in late June 1988, the Linus Write-Top was released to the public in July 1988, supported by a value-added reseller network of 25 retailers. The company marekted the Write-Top as a professional's tool rather than a mass-market product, aiming the tablet computer at real estate appriasers, actuaries, medical professionals, and construction managers, among other workforces.

By January 1989, the company had sold 1,000 units of the Write-Top and had secured at least one third-party software developer, Baxter International, whose Electronic Medical Systems subsidiary developed Your-Write compatible software for hospital personnel. The computer was warmly received in the press and by users, with Peter J. Harbeson of Manager's Magazine writing that it "may be the most exciting new technology for sales and management professionals since the invention of the laptop". Many more felt that the tablet's $3,000 asking price was too high, however, especially when coupled with the rather lacking pen-capable software library for the IBM PC. In mid-February 1990, by which point 1,500 units of the Write-Top were sold, Linus went bankrupt and dissolved. In a post-mortem interview with USA Today, Sklarew said that "We were a little too early with not enough staying power", with the majority of the company's time spent educating corporate buyers on the pen computing paradigm.

Following the collapse of Linus, the Write-Top patents were sold to Grid Systems, then a subsidiary of Tandy Corporation. Grid had introduced their own tablet computer, the GridPad 1900, in 1989, to much greater commercial success than the Write-Top.
