= Personal communicator =

Electronic device

The term personal communicator has been used with several meanings. Around 1990 the next generation digital mobile phones were called digital personal communicators. Another definition, coined in 1991, is for a category of handheld devices that provide personal information manager functions and packet switched wireless data communications capabilities over wireless wide area networks such as cellular networks. These devices are now commonly referred to as smartphones.

== See also ==
- AT&T EO Personal Communicator, 1993
- IBM Simon Personal Communicator, 1994
- Nokia Communicator
- Wireless PDA
- Smartphone
