= Alcatel-Lucent v. Microsoft Corp. =

Legal case

Lucent Technologies Inc. v. Gateway Inc.
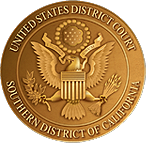
- Court: United States District Court for the Southern District of California
- Docket nos.: 3:02-cv-02060 3:03-cv-00699 3:03-cv-01108 3:06-cv-00684 3:07-cv-02000
- Citations: 470 F. Supp. 2d 1163 (S.D. Cal. 2007); 470 F. Supp. 2d 1180 (S.D. Cal. 2007); 470 F. Supp. 2d 1187 (S.D. Cal. 2007), affirmed, 525 F.3d 1200 (Fed. Cir. 2008); 509 F. Supp. 2d 912 (S.D. Cal. 2007), affirmed, 543 F.3d 710 (Fed. Cir. 2008); Lucent Techs., Inc. v. Microsoft Corp., 544 F. Supp. 2d 1080 (S.D. Cal. 2008); 580 F. Supp. 2d 1016 (S.D. Cal. 2008); affirmed in part, vacated in part, and remanded, 580 F.3d 1301 (Fed. Cir. 2009); cert. denied, Microsoft Corp. v. Lucent Techs., Inc., 560 U.S. 935 (2010)

Court membership
- Judges sitting: Rudi M. Brewster, Marilyn L. Huff

Alcatel-Lucent v. Microsoft Corp., also known as Lucent Technologies Inc. v. Gateway Inc., was a long-running patent infringement case between Alcatel-Lucent and Microsoft litigated in the United States District Court for the Southern District of California and appealed multiple times to the United States Court of Appeals for the Federal Circuit. Alcatel-Lucent was awarded $1.53 billion in a final verdict in August 2007 in the U.S. District Court for the Southern District of California in San Diego. The damages award was reversed on appeal in September 2009, and the case was returned for a separate trial on the amount of damages.

== Origin ==
The dispute between Microsoft and Lucent (and later Alcatel-Lucent) began in 2003 when Lucent Technologies (merged with Alcatel in 2006) filed suit against Gateway and Dell in U.S. District Court, San Diego, California. Lucent claimed in this first San Diego case that Dell and Gateway had violated patents on MP3-related technologies developed by Bell Labs, a division of predecessor company American Telephone & Telegraph. Other patents said to be infringed relate to MPEG video technology, speech technology, internet technology, and other technologies. Microsoft voluntarily joined the lawsuit in April 2003 and Alcatel was added after it acquired Lucent.

After the first San Diego lawsuit was filed, Microsoft and Lucent have filed additional patent lawsuits against each other.

In February 2007, Microsoft filed a lawsuit at the International Trade Commission claiming that Alcatel-Lucent infringed its patents.

There is a second case in San Diego where Microsoft is asserting that Alcatel-Lucent infringes 10 of its patents, and yet another case in Texas where each alleges that the other is infringing its patents.

== Patents ==
In the first San Diego case, Alcatel-Lucent claims ownership of several patents relating to MP3 and MPEG encoding and compression technologies, as well as other technologies. The patents were obtained as the result of work done at Bell Labs before the breakup of American Telephone & Telegraph. Certain patents at issue were:

U.S. Patent No. 5,341,457, Perceptual Coding of Audio Signals, to Joseph L. Hall and James D. Johnston. Filed: August 20, 1993 Granted: August 23, 1994

U.S. Reissue Patent No. RE39,080, Rate loop processor for perceptual encoder/decoder, to James D. Johnston. Filed: August 13, 2002. Reissue of 05627938 Filed: Sep., 1994 Granted: May., 1997

== Trials ==
The first part of the San Diego case involved the '457 and '080 audio coding patents. Alcatel-Lucent claimed that Microsoft's Windows Media Player infringed these patents by virtue of its MP3 capabilities. Testimony was given by inventors James Johnston and Joseph Hall. Coincidentally, AT&T inventor James Johnston was employed by Microsoft post-AT&T breakup and during the trial. Additional testimony was taken from Dr. Karlheinz Brandenburg, who worked with Johnston at Bell Labs.

On February 22, 2007, a San Diego jury found for Alcatel-Lucent and against Microsoft. Alcatel-Lucent was awarded a record-breaking $1.52 billion in damages. The damages could have been $4.5 billion but the jury was unable to decide if the infringement was "willful." Microsoft disputed the verdict, maintaining that the federal jury's decision was "unsupported by the law or facts", since Microsoft had already paid $16 million to license the technology from Fraunhofer IIS which, it claims, is "the industry-recognized rightful licensor".

Subsequently, on August 6, 2007 the federal judge in San Diego, U.S. District Judge Rudi Brewster, granted Microsoft's motions for Judgment as a matter of law (JMOL) and for new trial, saying that the jury's decision was not supported by the evidence. The Judge's Order found that there was insufficient evidence both for Microsoft's liability and for the damages model used by Alcatel-Lucent. Alcatel-Lucent appealed the judge's decision, and the Court of Appeals for the Federal Circuit heard oral arguments in July 2007. The Court of Appeals published its decision on September 25, 2008, upholding the dismissal of the case by Judge Brewster on two grounds. The court held that Fraunhofer was a joint developer and thus co-owner of one patent, which meant that Lucent lacked standing to sue. The other patent was not infringed because Lucent failed to show that the patented algorithm was ever used by Microsoft's products.

A week after the first jury verdict, on March 2, Judge Brewster granted summary judgment in the second part of the case that Microsoft had not violated Alcatel-Lucent's patents relating to speech recognition, and the case was therefore dismissed before going to trial. Alcatel-Lucent stated that it intended to appeal.

The trial in the third part of the San Diego case involved four patents. In April 2008, a jury awarded Alcatel-Lucent $367.4 million in damages after finding that Microsoft had violated two patents related to the user interface in its software. One of the patents found infringed by Microsoft's Tablet PC products involved technology originally developed by GO Corp. concerning gestures using a stylus on a tablet computer. (Microsoft's acquisition of the technology is the subject of a separate antitrust lawsuit against Microsoft.) The bulk of the damages award resulted from the jury's finding infringement of another patent titled "Touch Screen Form Entry System" that was found to cover form entry methods in Microsoft's Outlook and other products. In June 2008, the trial judge upheld the jury's verdict and increased the damage award against Microsoft to $512 million to account for interest.

In the fourth San Diego case, the jury issued its verdict on June 2, 2008. This time both Microsoft and Lucent were asserting that the other side was infringing its patents. The jury found that Lucent did not infringe Microsoft's patents (and one patent was invalid) and that Microsoft's Xbox did not infringe Lucent's patent.

== Settlement ==
In November 2008, Microsoft and Alcatel-Lucent announced they had agreed to settle of most of the patent litigation between the companies. The case on appeal regarding user interfaces, in which Alcatel-Lucent was awarded $512 million, was excluded from this settlement agreement.

== See also ==
- Landmark decisions in the United States
- Microsoft litigation
