= Robert Carr (programmer) =

- Born: 1956 (age 69–70)
- Citizenship: American
- Education: Stanford University
- Known for: Framework

Robert Carr (born 1956) is credited as the architect of GO Corporation's PenPoint OS. He subsequently served as Vice President of the AutoCAD Market Group at Autodesk, Inc., where he led Internet work, managed 330 staff and was responsible for its flagship product, AutoCAD. He also created the Framework integrated office suite.

Carr's ideas about programming and software design are described in the book Programmers at Work, a collection of interviews published by Microsoft Press in 1986.
