= GridPad =

Series of pen computing tablets

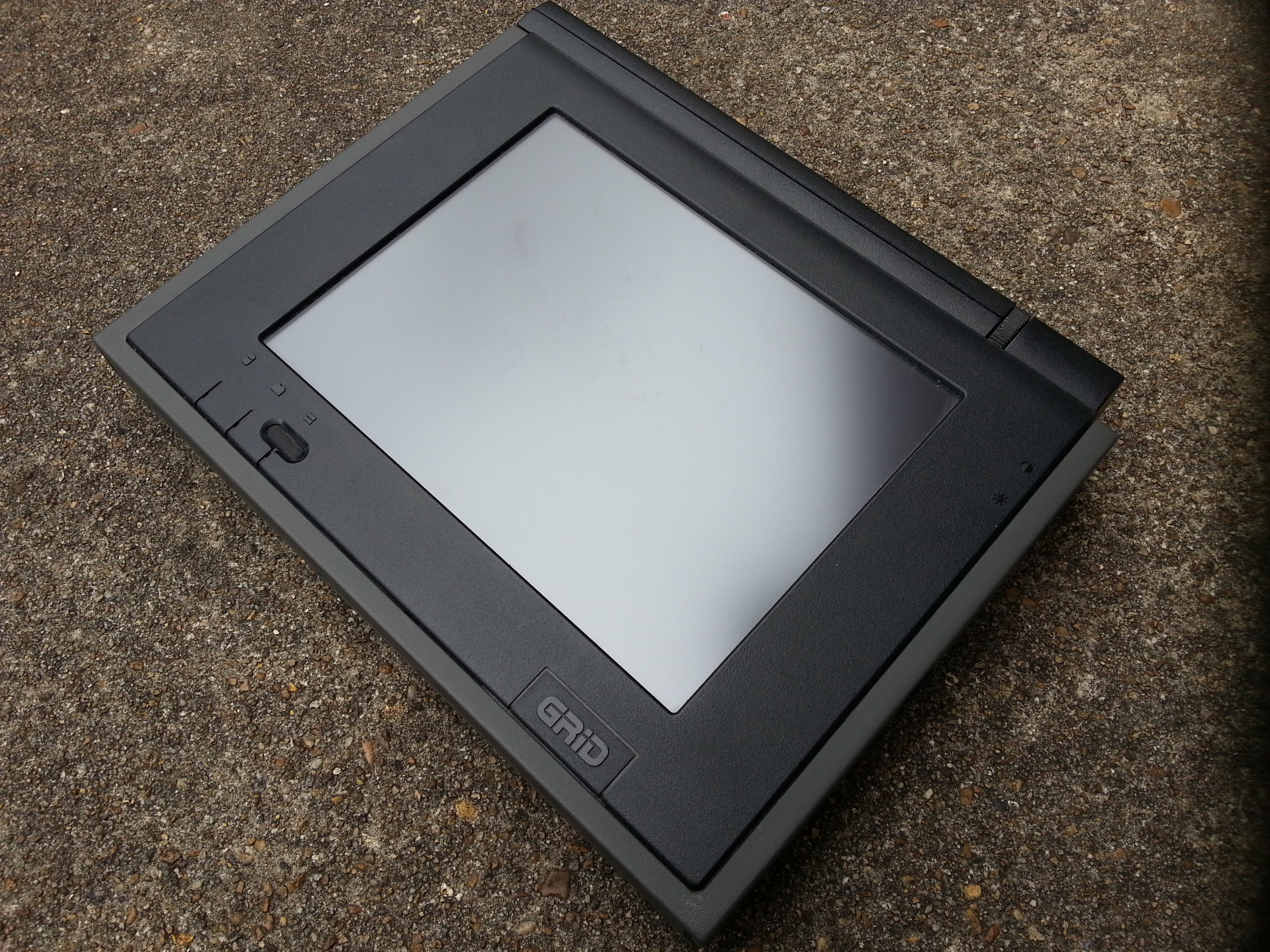
- GRiDPad 2260 in tablet mode
- Also known as: GRiD PalmPad (235# models); GRiD Convertible (22#0 models)
- Developer: Grid Systems Corporation
- Type: Tablet computer or 2-in-1 PC
- Released: September 28, 1989; 36 years ago
- Discontinued: 1994

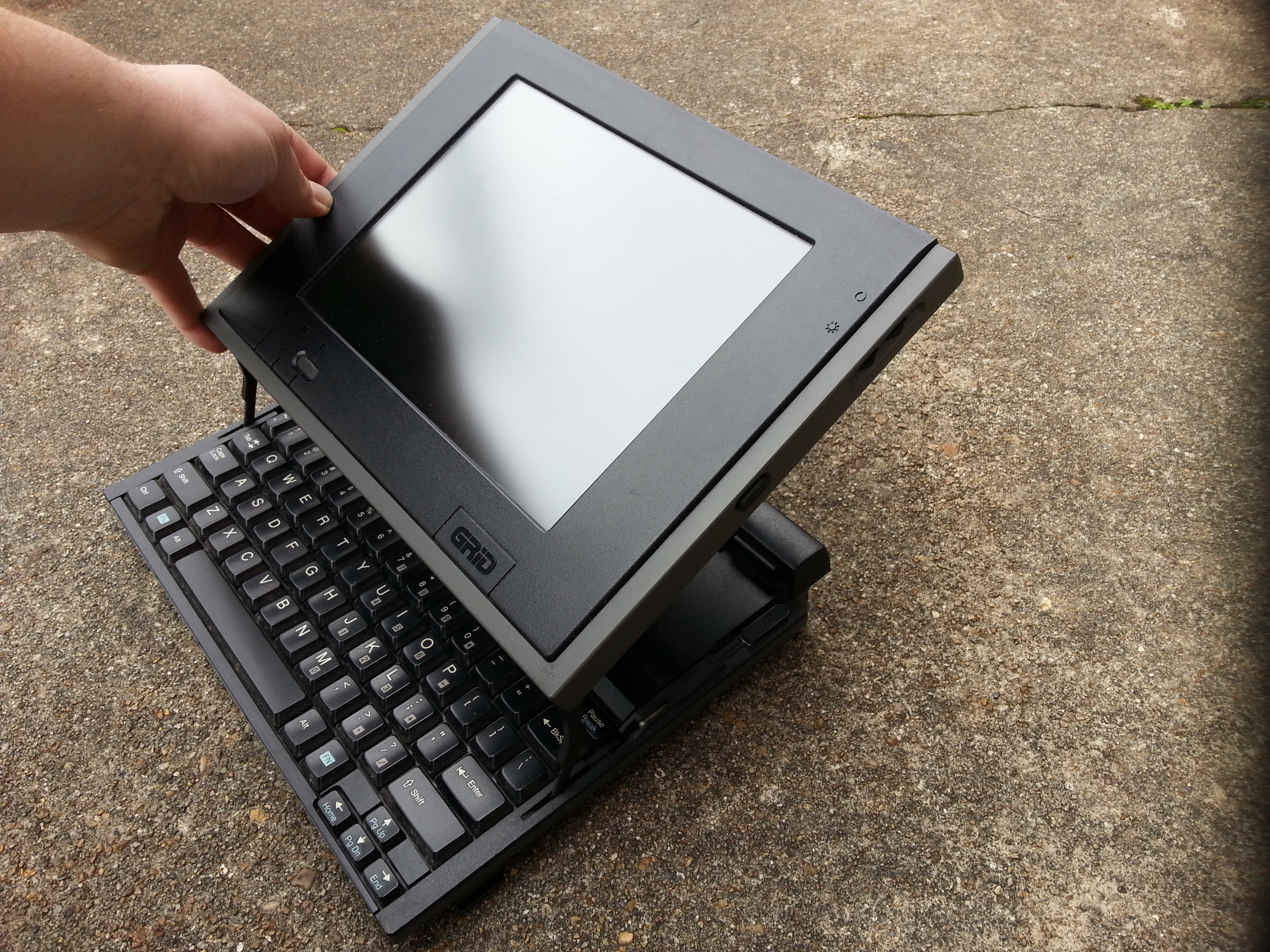
GridPad 2260 in "laptop" mode

The GridPad (stylized as GRiDPad) is a discontinued family of pen-enabled tablet computers and hybrid laptops built by Grid Systems Corporation.

The GRiDPad 1900, released in September 28, 1989, is regarded as the first commercially successful tablet computer and predecessor to modern 2-in-1 devices. Jeff Hawkins went on to use the GRiDPad as a predecessor for his best known-invention, the Palm Pilot.

== Specifications ==
The GRiDPad 1900 measured 9 by 12 by 1.4 inches (229 mm × 305 mm × 36 mm) and weighed 4.5 pounds (2.0 kg). The main distinguishing aspect was its touchscreen interface with a stylus, a pen-like tool to aid with precision in a touchscreen device. The stylus was able to use handwriting-recognition software. The GRiDPad also included these features:

- 10 MHz 80C86 processor
- MS-DOS operating system – the popular operating system used by IBM PC-compatible personal computers
- A monochromatic Color Graphics Adapter (CGA) display resolution of 640x400
- 256KB or 512KB battery-backed RAM cards
- 1MB or 2MB of system memory
- One serial port, two ATA-FLASH slots, and an expansion bus connector

== Models ==
Device	Model No.	Processor	Memory	Storage	Display	Software	Weight & dimensions	Introduced	Notes
GridPad	1900	Intel 8086 (10 MHz)	1 MB RAM	PCMCIA	10", 640 × 400 B&W	MSDOS 3.3, GridPen	4.5 lb (2.0 kg), 12.5 x 9.25 x 1.5"	Sep 1989	1st tablet
GridPad HD/RC	1910	NEC v20 (9.5 MHz)	2 MB RAM	1–2 PCMCIA; 20 MB HDD option	10", 640 × 400 B&W backlit	MSDOS 3.3, GridPen	4.5 lb (2.0 kg), 12.5 x 9.25 x 1.5"	Jul 1991	20MB HDD on HD; RC has 2 PCMCIA and wireless option
PalmPad	2350/51/52	NEC v20 (9.5 MHz)	2–2.5 MB RAM	PCMCIA	6.5", 640 × 400 B&W backlit	MSDOS 5.0, PenRight	2.8 lb (1.3 kg), 9 x 6.25 x 1.9" (318 x 235 x 38 mm)	Mar 1992	1st Wearable; Wireless 902-928 MHz spread spectrum radio on 2352
GridPad SL	2050	Intel 80386 (20 MHz)	20 MB RAM	40–120 MB HDD; PCMCIA	10", VGA, 32 greyscale	Windows 3.1 for Pen, PenRight	2.26 kg, 292 × 236 × 37.6 mm	1992	Licensed variation of Samsung Penmaster
GridPad Convertible	2260/2270	80386/80486SL (25 MHz)	4–20 MB RAM	80–120 MB HDD; PCMCIA	9.5", VGA, 64 greyscale	Windows 3.1 for Pen, PenRight	9.6 lb (4.4 kg)	Dec 1992	1st Convertible; Screen moves up to reveal full keyboard; Also sold as AST PenExec 3/25SL and 4/25SL
GridPad	2390	7.5-MHz 8088-compatible CPU	4 MB RAM	PCMCIA	320 x 256	MSDOS 3.3, GEOS 2.0, PenRight	0.95 lb (0.43 kg), 7 x 4.25 x 1"	Jun 1993	Casio Zoomer/ Z-7000, XL7000, Tandy Z-PDA and AST Gridpad 2390

Because of its use for inventory management, the United States Army specified more durable versions of the tablet made out of magnesium that were not sold to the general public. The US Army specially ordered magnesium because it is a strong yet light metal, making it ideal for use in demanding environments.

According to a patent submitted in 1992 by an engineer at GRiD Systems, the touchscreen in the GRiDPad works by magnifying an internal Cartesian plane and calculating the displacement. Further patents by Jeff Hawkins describe flipping the screen orientation between landscape and portrait.

== Reception ==
Because of its text-recognition interface, the GRiDPad was marketed toward specialist consumers who would use the tablet for bookkeeping. The GRiDPad was "designed to streamline the chores of workers such as route delivery drivers and claims adjusters, who typically recorded data on paper forms." Some of the agencies that used the GRiDPad included Chrysler, San Jose Police Department, and even the US Government. The first commercial customer to use the GRiDPad and who contributed to the overall requirements was Best Foods Baking Group, a division of CPC International.

The average selling price for one unit was US$2,370 without software, and $3,000 with software. It was so successful that it sold approximately $30 million in its best year.

== Legacy ==
Although the GriDPad had the same operating system as personal computers, it was not designed to be a replacement for computers. Hawkins once said, "I never saw pen computers as a replacement for a full PC..." Although it did not replace computers, it did pave the way for other companies to invest more into tablet computers.

Not only did the GRiDPad start paving the way for tablet computers, it also helped propel Jeff Hawkins' career. Hawkins used the same stylus technology to develop his most commercially successful product, the Palm Pilot, making the GRiDPad its predecessor.

== See also ==
- GridCase
- PenPoint OS
- Linus Write-Top
