= Return from the Stars =

1961 novel by Stanisław Lem

- First edition
- Author: Stanisław Lem
- Original title: Powrót z gwiazd
- Cover artist: Marian Stachurski
- Language: Polish
- Genre: Science fiction
- Publisher: Czytelnik (first Polish edition); Harcourt Brace Jovanovich (first English edition)
- Publication date: 1961
- Publication place: Poland
- English publication date: 1980
- Media type: Print (Hardcover & Paperback)
- Pages: 247 (first English edition)
- ISBN: 0-15-177082-4 (first English edition)
- OCLC: 5940875
- Dewey Decimal: 891./537
- LC Class: PZ4.L537 Re PG7158.L39

Return from the Stars (Polish: Powrót z gwiazd) is a science fiction novel by Polish author Stanisław Lem. Written in 1961, it is the story of a cosmonaut returning to his homeworld, Earth, after more than a century in Earth time, but just 10 years for him, finding it a completely different place, with many developments he dislikes. The novel touches the ideas of social alienation, culture shock and dystopia. It was first translated into English in 1980 by Barbara Marszal and Frank Simpson.

== Plot summary ==
The novel tells the story of an astronaut, Hal Bregg, who returns to Earth after a mission to Fomalhaut during which the Earth passed through 127 years of proper time. Due to time dilation, the mission has lasted only 10 years for him. On Earth he faces culture shock, as he finds the society transformed into a utopia, free of wars or violence, or even accidents.

For Hal, however, this new world is too comfortable, too safe. Earth is no longer home, it is "another, alien planet". Humans themselves have changed, having undergone a procedure called betrization, designed to neutralize all aggressive impulses. Its side effect is an extreme aversion to risk. Hal mistrusts this approach, seeing it as wrong. In particular, for an astronaut, he cannot agree with the opinion that space travel and space exploration are nothing but a youthful and dangerous adventurism. For Hal, this means that "...they have killed the man in man". He and the other returning astronauts are viewed with mistrust, seen as "resuscitated Neanderthals". They are alienated, outcasts, and subject to social pressure to undertake behavioural treatment replacing betrization. The other choice is to leave Earth again and hope that once they come back, in several centuries, Earth's society is more familiar again.

In time, Hal marries a local girl, Eri, and comes to see the world her way, even disapproving of his youth's love, space expeditions. When he learns that members of his former crew are planning a mission to Sagittarius, he seems not to care, content to leave the stars to others. Hal still remembers his past, recalls the moon Kereneia, a magnificent canyon "made of red and pink gold, almost completely transparent...through it you can see all the strata, geological folds, anticlines and synclines...all this is weightless, floating and seeming to smile at you". Yet he trades the chance to experience such sights and adventures for love and a peaceful, quiet life.

== Major themes ==
Return from the Stars is one of Lem's several works focusing on utopia. Out of those, it is the least pessimistic about the consequences of technological progress and their effect on our sociocultural evolution. Even so, the depicted world is not perfect: in a pacified society, with no conflict, stress, and danger, Lem argues that humans will become unable to take any risks, to take initiative, commit themselves to any serious tasks, and even lose the ability for self-assertion and for feeling strong emotions. Return from the Stars asks whether some sociocultural advances, like peace, are worth the price we may pay for losing part of our nature.

Lem predicts the disappearance of paper books from the society. Lem even describes a reading device very much like a tablet computer that the main character Hal Bregg gets familiar with when he tries to find paper books and newspapers. The novel also anticipates electronic paper and tablet computers with "Opton".

== Reception ==
Lem himself judged the novel as unsuccessful, because the centrepiece idea of the plot, elimination of social evil, was treated in a simplistic way, although he did find the idea of betrization interesting.

The theme would find much more thorough attention in Lem's 1982 novel Observation on the Spot.

== Adaptations ==
Aleksander Ford wanted to direct the film based on the novel, but he wanted a large-budget film and failed to find investors.

1989 it was filmed as a Soviet TV play, "Возвращение со звёзд", with Valery Solovyov as Hal Bregg.

Saxophonist Mark Turner's album of the same name is a reference to the book.
