= Pencept =

American computer company

Pencept, Inc.
- Company type: Private
- Industry: Electronics
- Founded: 1980
- Headquarters: Waltham, Massachusetts
- Products: PenPad / Pen Computing / Handwriting recognition

Pencept, Inc. was a company in the 1980s that developed and marketed pen computing.

Pencept was noted primarily for the robustness (for the time) of the handwriting and gesture recognition algorithms, and for an emphasis on developing novel user interface approaches for employing gesture recognition and handwriting recognition that would work with existing applications hardware and software.

Pencept employed a proprietary technology for on-line character recognition, based on a functional attribute model of human reading. Thus, unlike many other recognition algorithms employed for handwriting recognition, the recognition was generally user-independent and did not involve training to a user's particular writing style.

Early products included the PenPad 200 handwriting-only computer terminal that was a direct replacement for the VT-100 and other standard ANSI 3.62 terminals, but with a digitizing tablet and electronic pen and no keyboard. With the advent of the IBM personal computer, later products, such as the PenPad 320 focused particularly graphics and CAD/CAM applications for the DOS operating system, as well as for data entry and data editing applications.

The Pencept systems were featured in demonstrations at the 1983 and 1985 CHI conferences. A video showing parts of the 1985 demonstration at the CHI 85 conference is available from the Open-Video.org on-line collection.

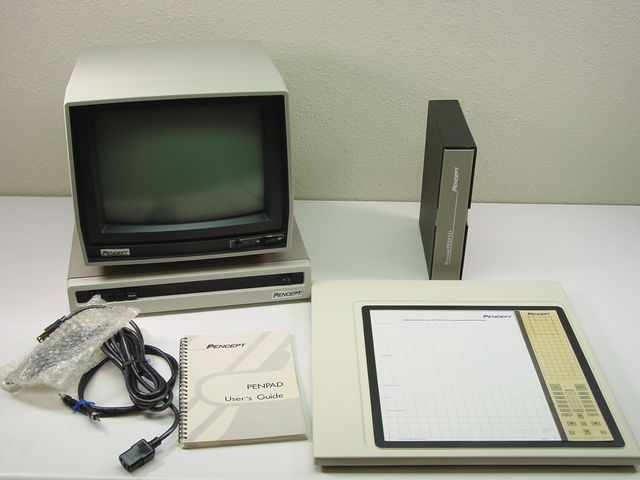
Pencept Penpad 200 Terminal, c. 1983

== See also ==
- Pen computing
- Handwriting recognition
