= Robert Nadeau (science historian) =

American academic (1944–2025)

Robert Lee Nadeau (21 January 1944 – 24 July 2025) was an American professor in the English Department at George Mason University, where he began working in 1975 and from which he retired in 2012. His later research focused on integration between economic and environmental thinking. At George Mason, he founded the Global Environmental Network Center, and had argued vehemently against climate change deniers, who he said are on a "genocidal campaign".

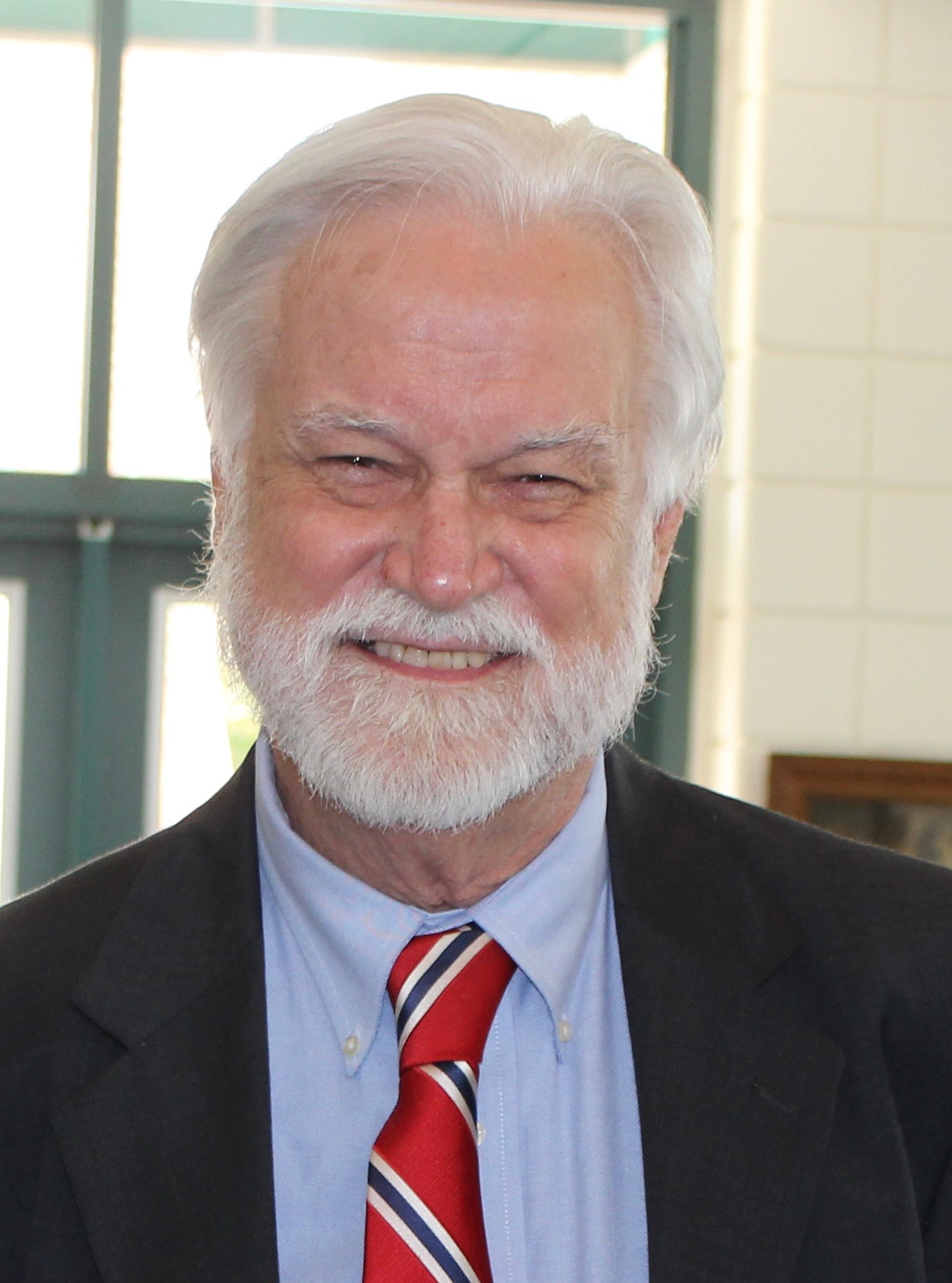
Photo of Dr. Robert Nadeau

Nadeau died on 24 July 2025, at the age of 81.

== Books ==
- Nadeau, Robert L. (1981). Readings from the New Book on Nature: Physics and Metaphysics in the Modern Novel. Amherst, MA: University of Massachusetts Press. ISBN 978-0-87023-331-9.
- Nadeau, Robert L. (1984). Nature Talks Back: Pathways to Survival in the Nuclear Age. Alexandria, VA: Orchises Press. ISBN 0-914061-01-1.
- Kafatos, Menas; Nadeau, Robert L. (1990). The Conscious Universe: Part and Whole in Modern Physical Theory. New York: Springer-Verlag. ISBN 978-0-387-97262-6.
- Nadeau, Robert L. (1991). Mind, Machines, and Human Consciousness: Are There Limits to Artificial Intelligence? Chicago: Contemporary Books (McGraw-Hill). ISBN 978-0-8092-4025-8.
- Nadeau, Robert L. (1996). S/He Brain: Science, Sexual Politics, and the Myths of Feminism. Westport, CT: Praeger. ISBN 978-0-275-95593-9.
- Nadeau, Robert L.; Kafatos, Menas (1999). The Non-Local Universe: The New Physics and Matters of the Mind. New York: Oxford University Press. ISBN 978-0-19-514408-6.
- Nadeau, Robert L. (2003). The Wealth of Nature: How Mainstream Economics Has Failed the Environment. New York: Columbia University Press. ISBN 978-0-231-12798-1.
- Nadeau, Robert L. (2006). The Environmental Endgame: Mainstream Economics, Ecological Disaster, and Human Survival. New Brunswick, NJ: Rutgers University Press. ISBN 978-0-8135-3812-9.
- Nadeau, Robert L. (2013). Rebirth of the Sacred: Science, Religion, and the New Environmental Ethos. New York: Oxford University Press. ISBN 978-0-19-994236-7.

== See also ==
- Linus Write-Top, an early tablet computer which Nadeau co-developed
