= GO Corporation =

American software company

- Industry: Software industry; Consumer electronics
- Founded: 1987
- Founders: Jerry Kaplan; Robert Carr; Kevin Doren
- Defunct: July 1994
- Products: EO Personal Communicator

GO Corporation was a company founded in 1987 to create pen-based portable computers, and a pen-based operating system and software. It was a pioneer of pen-based computing and was one of the most well-funded start-up companies of its time.

Its founders were Jerry Kaplan, Robert Carr, and Kevin Doren. Mr. Kaplan subsequently chronicled the history of the company in his book Startup: A Silicon Valley Adventure. Omid Kordestani, former Senior VP of Global Business at Google, began his startup career with GO Corporation. Other notable GO alumni include CEO Bill Campbell (who later became chairman of Intuit), VP Sales Stratton Sclavos (took VeriSign public as its CEO), CFO and VP of Business Operations Randy Komisar (became CEO of LucasArts), and VP Marketing Mike Homer (was VP Marketing at time of Netscape's IPO in 1995).

== History ==
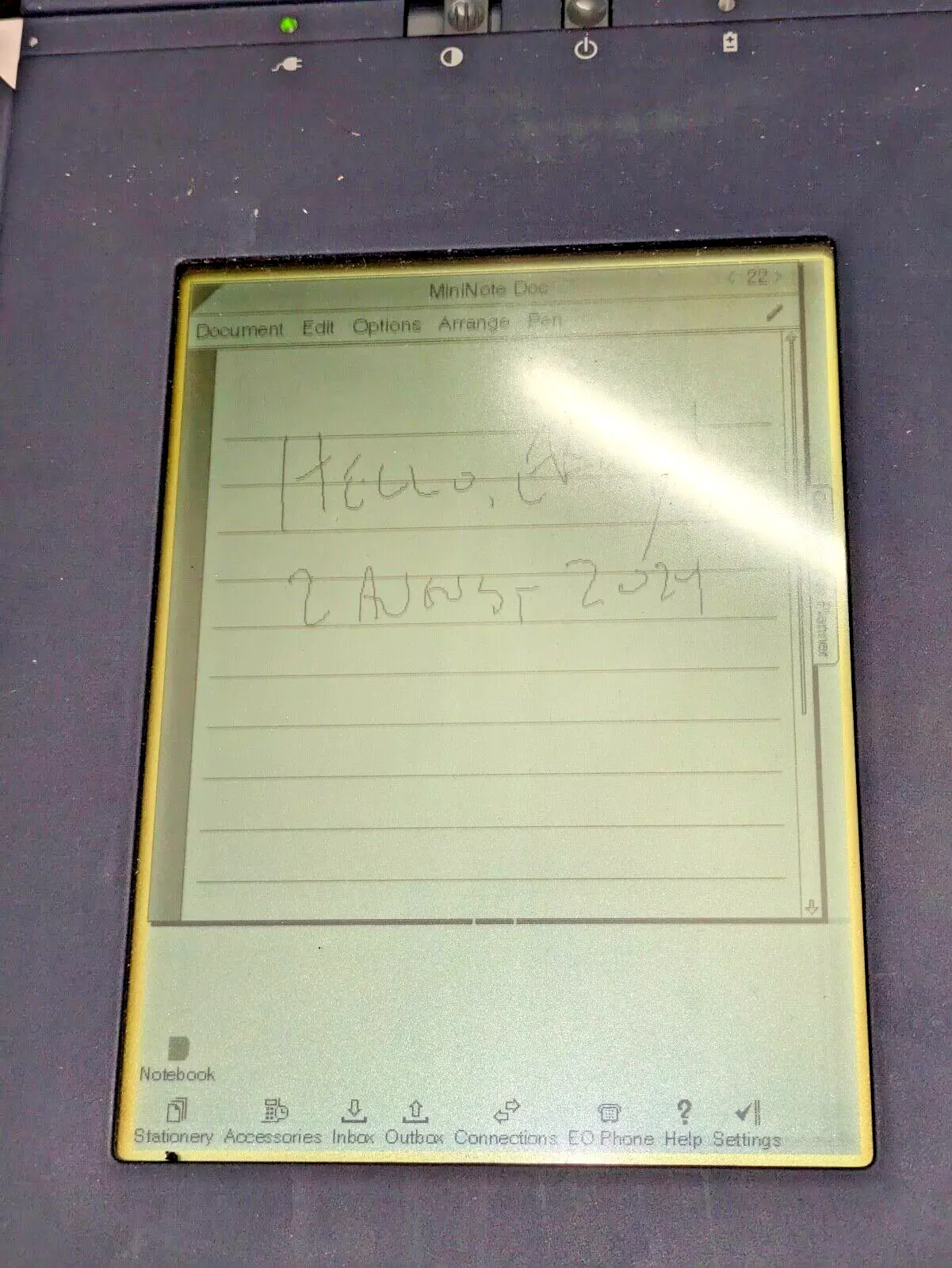
GO's pen tablet prototype running PenPoint

GO developed the PenPoint OS software, and an Intel 286-based lightweight "Go Computer" specifically for developers and evaluators; the company emphasized end users would run PenPoint OS on third-party hardware. PenPoint OS ran on a number of Intel x86-powered tablet PCs from IBM (the first use of the "ThinkPad" brand name), NCR, and others, and on AT&T's EO Personal Communicator.

The company enjoyed high levels of public awareness and generally positive attention from industry press, but it ran into fierce competition, first from Microsoft (whose Pen Services for Windows were later the subject of an FTC investigation and patent violation suits by GO), and later from Apple's Newton project, and others. The company lined up software development partners but struggled to deliver the hardware and software on their intended schedule. In 1991, they spun off their hardware unit under the name EO Inc. In 1993 EO was acquired by AT&T Corporation, who hoped that its devices would showcase their AT&T Hobbit microprocessors. This sale raised much-needed cash but introduced new problems, as EO then ceased to coordinate well with GO's management, even considering adopting competing operating systems. Facing a cash crisis, GO agreed to sell itself to AT&T as well, bringing the two halves of the company back under one roof as of January 1994.

Despite some success in vertical markets, consumers in the 1990s did not adopt tablet computing as enthusiastically as GO management had expected. In January 1994, only two weeks after acquiring GO, AT&T decided to cancel the Hobbit product line, leaving it no reason to continue to support EO or GO. They had by then ceased to develop for other chips, and sales on the other platforms were small anyway. Co-founder Jerry Kaplan says that in its lifetime, the company generated "no meaningful sales". The loss of AT&T's support left GO with little chance of future revenue and, after burning through $75 million of venture funding, the company closed in July 1994.

== Lawsuits ==
On 29 June 2005, Kaplan filed an antitrust lawsuit against Microsoft, alleging that Microsoft technicians had stolen technology from GO that had been shown to them under a non-disclosure agreement.

In a separate legal matter, in April 2008 certain features of the Microsoft's Windows/Tablet PC operating system and hardware were found to infringe on a patent by GO Corporation concerning user interfaces for pen computers.

== See also ==
- Apple Newton
- PenPoint OS
- Pen computing
- History of tablet computers
