= RAND Tablet =

Computer input device

The RAND Tablet is a graphical computer input device developed by The RAND Corporation. The RAND Tablet is claimed to be the first digital graphic device marketed as being a low cost device. The creation of the tablet was performed by the Advanced Research Projects Agency. The RAND Tablet was one of the first devices to utilize a stylus as a highly practical instrument.

The tablet is connected to an input of a computer and/or an oscilloscope display. The display would register the input and display it on the computer screen.

== History ==
Development of the RAND Tablet began with research on the Sketchpad, a system where the user could write commands for a computer directly on the tablet, conducted by Ivan Sutherland. A multitude of different experimental systems were developed to recognize handwritten letters and gestures like Tom Ellis' flowchart based Graphic Input Language (GRAIL) method. Tom Ellis, an author of many RAND corporation reports, stated that this GRAIL system was what allowed the natural and real-time recognition of text and symbols written on the flowchart. The RAND Tablet was one of the first devices to recognize freehand drawing, using programs like Ellis'. The RAND Tablet was also called the "Grafacon" and is considered one of the first produced graphics tablets. The original RAND Tablet cost $18,000 and was available to research facilities in 1964 after years of development. However, the RAND Tablet did not catch on commercially, likely due to an inertia in user habits which made consumers more familiar with a keyboard device, and the lack of practical applications for a tablet device during this time period.

== Description ==
The RAND Tablet is a large 10"x10" printed-circuit screen with printed-circuit capacitive-coupled encoders and 40 external connections. The surface has 100 lines per inch resolution so it is able to digitize in over 1 million locations. This is why the handwriting functionality appeared to be so natural. The tablet connects to the input channel of a general-purpose computer and to an oscilloscope display which controls the multiplexes of the pen position information.

The tablet design initially consisted of a woven grid of Formex wires. Each wire has a 0.1" resolution and is driven by a digital signal which indicates its position in the matrix. A free-hand stylus would pick up a signal unique to its position when moving over the surface. By the time of the tablet's production, printed-circuit technology had advanced to allow a grid of copper strips on a bi-axially oriented polyethylene terephthalate (boPET) surface to yield a resolution of 0.01". This surface was then covered with a plastic wear layer and mounted in a metal frame. The stylus used on the RAND Tablet had a tiny click switch that, when depressed, would send a signal to the machine.

== Capabilities ==
=== Handwriting recognition ===
A program was written in IBM 360 Assembler Language to allow an online computer user to write data and directives on the RAND Tablet. Using point-by-point pen location, the scheme could immediately recognize and display 53 letters, numbers, and symbols in multiple printing styles as long as they adhered to coding conventions. The tablet was able to pick up and identify multiple stroke symbols by analyzing the sequence of direction, end-point locations, and was even able to use contextual clues when necessary. The pen track is displayed until the symbol is recognized.

=== Chinese-Character Lookup ===
Chinese Character Lookup was a companion project which used the RAND Tablet to provide a translation aid. The desired character could be drawn on the tablet and when reproduced on the CRT display page, would include the character, its pronunciation, and its identification number in the standard Chinese-English dictionary. By analyzing point-by-point location of each stroke drawn by the tablet's pen, both Chinese and Roman characters could be identified in milliseconds.

=== Map Annotation ===
Markings, words, and symbols could by easily be added to maps using the RAND Tablet. The tablet proved to be a straightforward, convenient, and easy means to position boxes, lines, arrows, text, and other annotations over the display map. Digitally scanned maps were believed to be provided by the Defense Intelligence Agency and the USAF R&D facility at the Rome Air Development Center, however, they also could have been produced at RAND to interest the USAF.

=== Videographic System ===
RAND partnered with IBM to create a system which could merge information either provided by user actions or generated by computers with information coming from other sources. The RAND Video Graphic System serves 32 consoles, each with a full range of interaction and full graphics, and can accommodate up to 8 different input devices. Several computers could be accessed from any terminal. Scanning and buffer storage was centralized to improve performance and reduce cost. The heart of the Video Graphic system was an IBM 1800 computer and a 36" diameter magnetic disk to store scanned images and keep the parts of a displayed composite image in sync. However, the system was tricky and commercial development quickly overtook the technology, resulting in the program's termination.
