= EO Personal Communicator =

1993 tablet computer

EO Communicator 440/880
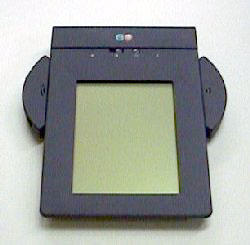
- Released: April 1993
- CPU: AT&T Hobbit

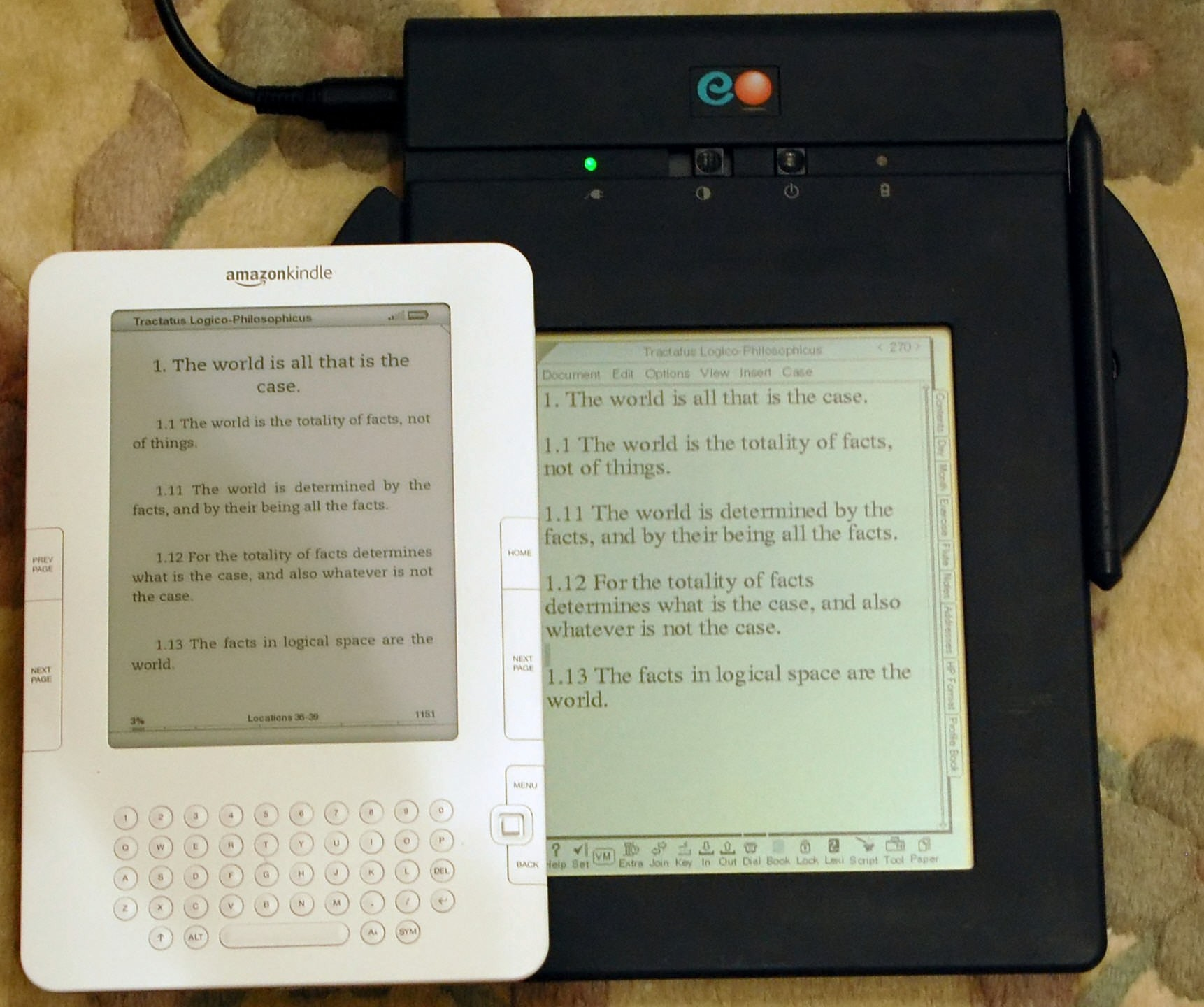
Comparison of the EO 440 Personal Communicator (1993) and the Amazon Kindle 2 e-book reader (2009). Both have reflective displays (no backlight). The EO has a liquid crystal display, the Kindle an electrophoretic one.

The EO is an early commercial tablet computer that was created by Eo Inc. (later acquired by AT&T Corporation), and released in April 1993. Eo (Latin for "I go") was the hardware spin-out of GO Corporation. Officially named the AT&T EO Personal Communicator, it is similar to a large personal digital assistant with Wireless communications, and competed against the Apple Newton. The unit was produced in conjunction with David Kelley Design, frog design, and the Matsushita, Olivetti and Marubeni corporations.

Among the EO customers AT&T claimed were: New York Stock Exchange, Andersen Consulting, Lawrence Livermore Laboratories, FD Titus & Sons and Woolworths.

Eo, Inc., 52 percent owned by AT&T, shut down operations on July 29, 1994, after failing to meet its revenue targets and to secure the funding to continue. It was reported that 10,000 of the computers had been sold.

In 2012, PC Magazine called the AT&T EO 440, "the first true phablet".

== Product specifics ==
Two models, the Communicator 440 and 880, were produced and measure about the size of a small clipboard. Both are powered by the AT&T Hobbit chip, created by AT&T specifically for running code written in the C programming language. They feature I/O ports such as modem, parallel, serial, VGA out and SCSI. The devices come with a cellular modem, a built-in microphone with speaker, and a free subscription to AT&T EasyLink Mail for both fax and e-mail messages.

The operating system, PenPoint OS, was created by GO Corporation. Widely praised for its simplicity and ease of use, the OS did not gain widespread use. The applications suite, Perspective, was licensed to EO by Pensoft.

== See also ==
- Pen computing
- History of tablet computers
- Celeste Baranski
