= NS Basic =

Software development tools

NSB/AppStudio
- Developer: NSB Corporation
- Stable release: 9.6.1 / November 7, 2026; 0 days ago
- Operating system: iOS, Android, Windows, MacOS
- Type: Programming
- License: Proprietary
- Website: www.appstudio.dev

NS Basic is a family of development tools developed and commercially marketed by NSB Corporation in Toronto, Ontario, Canada for iOS, Android, Microsoft Windows, MacOS, Linux, BlackBerry OS, webOS, Newton OS, Palm OS, Windows CE and Windows Mobile.

== History ==
NSB Corporation was founded by George Henne in 1993 to provide easy development tools for mobile devices. The manufacturers and licensors of the operating systems usually supply a C++-based tool aimed at highly skilled professional developers. NSB/AppStudio provides an alternative using the JavaScript or Basic programming language, similar to Visual Basic. Key developers include George Henne, Marcus Darden, James Kruth, Eric Pepke and Dan Rowley.

As of 2023, NS Basic's tools are used by over three million developers in over 80 countries.

Until 2019, NSB Corporation was known as NS BASIC Corporation.

== VoltSigner ==
VoltSigner is a free web service for creating signing certificates, so apps can run on devices and be accepted by Android and iOS stores. It was released in April, 2021 and has been regularly updated.

All processing is done locally - no information is uploaded. This keeps the certificates and passwords secure. A MacOS computer is not needed to create iOS certificates. No software needs to be installed on the user's system.

The certificates produced will work for any build tool - not just VoltBuilder. They can be used with Apache Cordova, Ionic Capacitor, Appflow and others.

The security and privacy of the signing keys are important. The NS BASIC certificate generating servers keep no records of passwords, or any private keys generated. No key material is stored on disk. No private information is kept in logs.

VoltServer is operated as a free service for the developer community by NSB Corporation.

== VoltBuilder ==
VoltBuilder is a commercial web service which builds native executables (.apk and .ipa) for Android and iOS from web apps. These executables can be augmented with npm native code plugins which extend capabilities far beyond what is possible in Web Apps and PWAs.

VoltBuilder is framework neutral: it does not use any other AppStudio products, nor does it restrict the use of other frameworks. Nothing needs to be installed locally.

VoltBuilder uses Apache Cordova and Ionic Capacitor to build executables. Projects which are compatible with those platforms can use the web service.

VoltBuilder was released in May, 2020 and has been continuously updated since then.

Many see it as a replacement for Adobe PhoneGap, which was discontinued on October 1, 2020.

== NSB/AppStudio ==
AppStudio was released in December, 2010. It consists of an IDE, a programming language and a deploy module. The IDE and programming language are modeled on Microsoft's Visual Studio. Two languages are supported for development: JavaScript and BASIC. Virtually the entire VBscript syntax is implemented. The runtime environment is based on JavaScript, HTML5 and WebKit: many of the features of the underlying technologies is exposed to the AppStudio environment. Programming can be done in Basic or JavaScript. PhoneGap, jQuery Mobile, Bootstrap and jQWidgets are fully integrated. The programs produced by AppStudio are Web apps.

Apps install themselves as PWA offline web or native applications. They can run on Apple's iOS devices (iPhone, iPad) and Android devices running 2.1 or later.

AppStudio can also be used to create Electron apps which run on Windows, MacOS and Linux. The use of Nodejs modules is supported.

The latest version of AppStudio 9.0.0.0 was released on Dec 16, 2023. It features an AI Coding Assistant based on ChatGPT, Bootstrap 5 and many other enhancements.

=== Example code ===
' in BASIC
Function OKButton_onclick()
    MsgBox "Hello World"
End Function

// in JavaScript
OKButton.onclick = function() {
    NSB.MsgBox("Hello World");
}

== Retired products ==
NSBasic/Newton, the company's first product, was released on July 1, 1994, and retired in 2002. for the Apple Newton MessagePad. It runs entirely on Newton OS devices. In 1997 it was joined by NewtCard, a Newton HyperCard analogue sold separately. The last version of NS Basic/Newton released was 3.61 in 1998.

NSBasic/CE was released in 1998 and retired in February, 2013. The last version of NSBasic/CE was 8.2.0, released in March, 2010.

NSBasic/Palm was released in 2000 and was retired in 2013. The last version of NSBasic/Palm was 7.0.0, released in February, 2009.

NSBasic/Symbian was released in August, 2008. It was retired in January, 2010.

NSBasic/Desktop was released in 2005 and was retired in 2013. The last version of NS Basic/Desktop was 4.0.0, released in June, 2009.

== Mobile application development ==
The company also undertakes custom development for companies who need applications for mobile devices, such as iPhone, Android, BlackBerry, Windows Mobile, and Palm OS. Applications can be developed for just one platform or for multiple platforms.
