= Richard F. Lyon =

American inventor (born 1952)

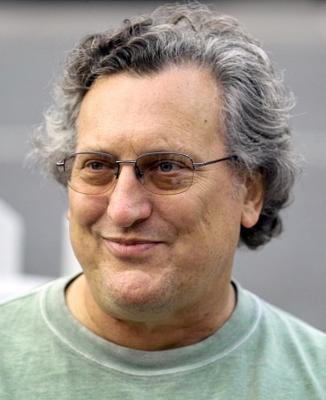
- Lyon in 2007
- Born: Richard Francis Lyon; 1952 (age 73–74); United States
- Education: California Institute of Technology; Stanford University
- Known for: Optical mouse; Inkwell (Macintosh); Co-founder of Foveon; Analog cochlea model
- Awards: IEEE Fellow (2003); Progress Medal of the Royal Photographic Society (2005); ACM Fellow (2010)
- Scientific career
- Fields: Electrical engineering
- Workplaces: Xerox PARC; Schlumberger; Apple; Foveon; Google
- Website: dicklyon.com

Richard Francis Lyon (born 1952) is an American inventor, scientist, and engineer. He is one of the two people who independently invented the first optical mouse devices in 1980. He has worked in signal processing and was a co-founder of Foveon, Inc., a digital camera and image sensor company.

== Early life and education ==
Lyon grew up in El Paso, Texas, as the third of nine children. His father, an engineer for the El Paso Electric Company, brought home an early Fortran programming manual to encourage his family's members to explore their interests in electronics.

Lyon attended Caltech to earn a bachelor's degree in electrical engineering, graduating in 1974. While at Caltech, Lyon worked with Carver Mead and John Pierce. He took a summer internship at Bell Labs, where he developed digital signal processing hardware for audio applications. He then enrolled in the graduate program at Stanford University intending to earn a PhD, but left with a master's degree in 1975 to work in Silicon Valley.

== Career ==
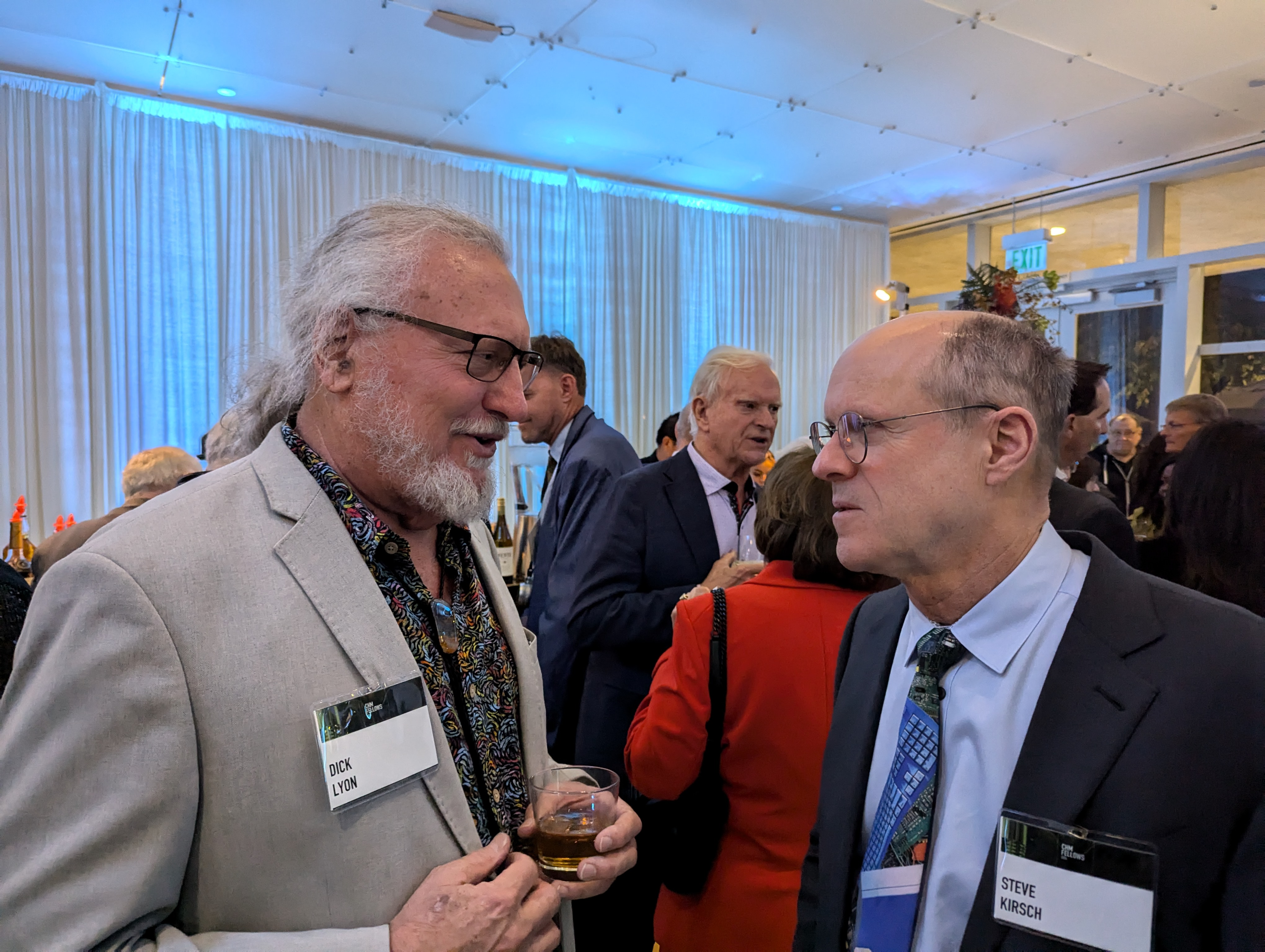
Lyon (left) with Steve Kirsch, the other independent inventor of the optical mouse

After Stanford, Lyon worked at Stanford Telecommunications, a small start up company developing signal sets for navigation satellites and Space Shuttle communication systems. During a return visit to Caltech around two and a half years after graduating, he ran into Carver Mead, who was hosting Ivan Sutherland and Bert Sutherland to develop some collaborations between Caltech and Xerox PARC and to develop a computer science department. Lyon joined Xerox PARC in 1977 after interviewing on invitation by Bert Sutherland.

Lyon started working at Xerox PARC with George White under Lynn Conway to build custom microchips for speech processing and digital filtering. Within the year, White left to manage the west coast laboratory of the ITT Defense Communications Division in San Diego, leaving Lyon in charge of the speech recognition project. During this period, he took a course at Stanford on biological information processing and wrote his term paper outlining an approach for speech recognition using a signal processing model of hearing. The paper became the basis for his career in hearing research.

In December 1980, Lyon was one of two people working independently who invented the first optical mouse devices. Lyon's design involved defining screen location using an adaptation of optical lateral inhibition to achieve a wide dynamic range.

Although several people at PARC had filed invention proposals for an optical mouse, none of them had built one or filed a patent for one. A substantially different design was invented at approximately the same time as Lyon's by Steve Kirsch at MIT.

In 1981, Lyon was one of the "Marty randoms" recruited by Jay Martin Tenenbaum to join Schlumberger Palo Alto Research. There, he led the speech recognition project.

In 1988, Lyon moved to the Apple Advanced Technology Group and led the Perception Systems group, where he worked mainly on auditory and sound processing. During this period he published a paper with Carver Mead describing an analog cochlea which modeled the propagation of sound in the inner ear and the conversion of acoustic energy into neural representations. The paper received the Best Paper Award from the IEEE Signal Processing Society in 1990 and formed a foundation for later work applying such models to hearing aids, cochlear implants, and other speech recognition hardware devices. With Malcolm Slaney, he developed the "cochleagram" representation for visualizing and processing sound for computational auditory scene analysis. With Larry Yaeger, Brandyn Webb, and others, he also developed the handwriting recognition system Inkwell for the Apple Newton.

During Apple's period of decline in the late 1990s, over half of the Advanced Technology Group was laid off as part of organizational restructuring, including Lyon and his team. He began working with Carver Mead and Richard B. Merrill to develop digital color photography and co-founded Foveon as a spin-off company from National Semiconductor and Synaptics. At Foveon, Lyon became its chief scientist and vice president of research, and helped develop a three-CCD camera and later the Foveon X3 sensor, which placed three stacked photodiodes onto a single chip – an innovative alternative to the more typical approaches of using either beam splitting with three sensor arrays or a spatial mosaic scheme such as Bayer filter mosaic. In 2005, Mead, Lyon, and Merrill received the Progress Medal of the Royal Photographic Society for the Foveon X3 sensor.

In 2006, Lyon returned to corporate research, moving to Google after briefly considering Yahoo. His research at Google has involved managing the camera development for Google Street View and sound recognition for various Google products. Most recently, he taught a course in 2010 at Stanford University and wrote a book, Human and Machine Hearing: Extracting Meaning from Sound, published in 2017.

== Inventions and research ==
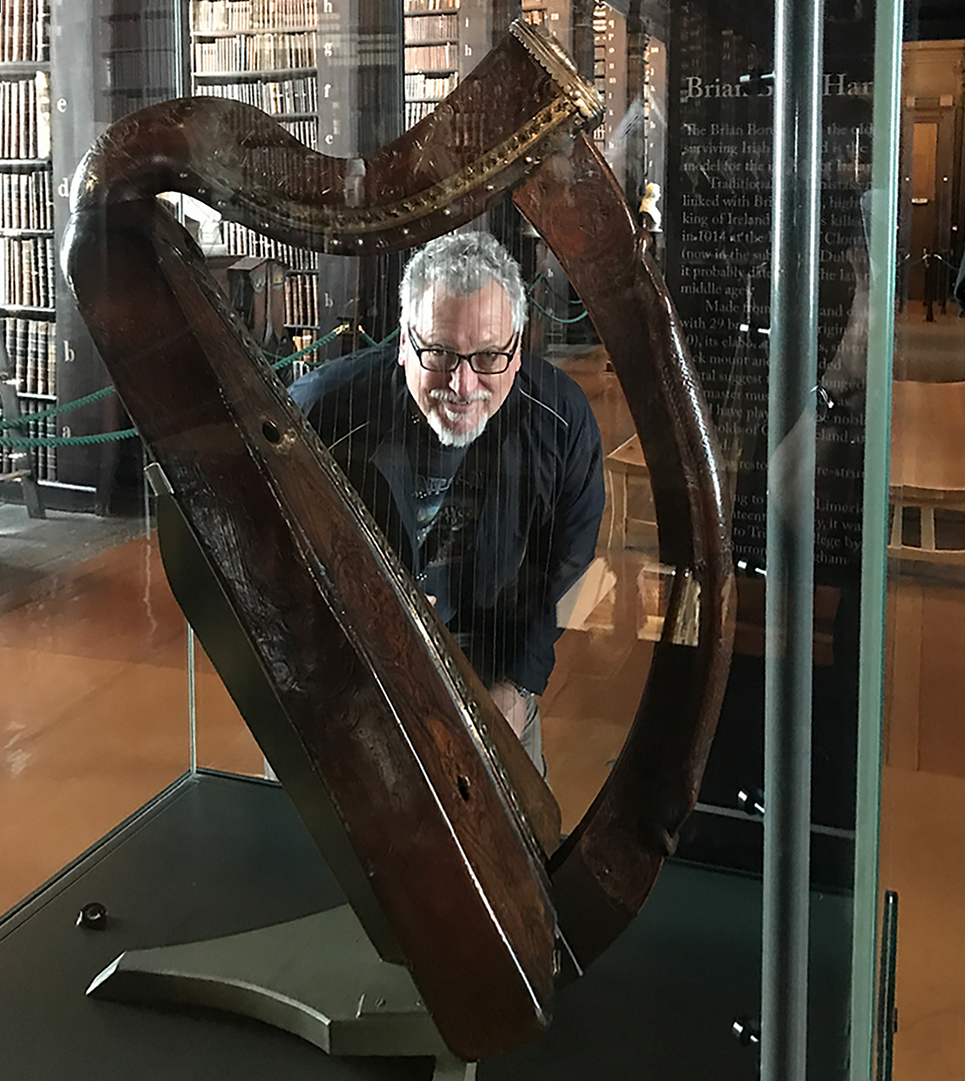
Lyon in 2017 at the Library of Trinity College Dublin's Long Room, posing with Brian Boru's harp

- Optical mouse: Lyon was one of two people who independently invented the first optical mouse devices. The other was Steve Kirsch, who independently invented a different type of optical mouse at MIT at approximately the same time. Both of them applied for patents on their schemes in mid-1981, and each of them received two U.S. patents (now expired).
- GPS: With James J. Spilker and others at Stanford Telecommunications, Lyon designed early Global Positioning System test transmitters.
- Ethernet hardware: With Gaetano Borriello and Alan G. Bell at Xerox PARC, Lyon invented the first single-chip Ethernet device.
- Digital memory: With Richard R. "Bic" Schediwy at Schlumberger, Lyon did early work on semi-static CMOS memory and designed the most efficient large CMOS address decoder.
- Auditory processing: Lyon invented a cochlear model that is used as the basis of much auditory research today.
- Digital color photography: With Richard B. Merrill, Carver Mead, and others, Lyon invented optical and integrated-circuit techniques that allow digital cameras to be denser and more accurate.
- With Larry Yaeger and Brandyn Webb of Apple, Lyon developed methods for handwriting recognition using multilayer perceptrons and related methods.

== Awards and recognition ==
- In 2003, Lyon was elected as an IEEE Fellow "for contributions to VLSI signal processing, models of hearing, handwriting recognition, and electronic color photography".
- In 2005, Lyon was awarded the Progress Medal of the Royal Photographic Society, along with Carver Mead and Richard B. Merrill of Foveon, for the development of the Foveon X3 sensor.
- In 2005, Lyon became one of the people featured in George Gilder's book, The Silicon Eye, which covered the development of the Foveon X3 sensor.
- In 2010, Lyon was named an ACM Fellow "for contributions to machine perception and for the invention of the optical mouse."
- In 2017, Lyon received the Industrial Innovation Award of the IEEE Signal Processing Society "for contributions in integrated circuits, cameras, and audio processing".

== Personal life ==
Lyon is married to Margaret Asprey; they have two children. He has contributed prolifically to Wikipedia.
