= Apple Newton Connection Kit =

Hardware kit by Apple

The Newton Connection Kit (NCK) was a package sold by Apple Inc. in the early 1990s which included the Newton Connection Software, a serial cable and manuals for connectivity between Macintosh personal computers and a Newton personal digital assistant. The kit allowed users of the Newton to synchronize it with a Macintosh, and also transfer files, restore Newton and install software onto a Newton. It cannot be used on any Newton that runs Newton OS 2.0 or greater. A version of the kit for Windows was also released.
