= MessagePad =

1993 personal digital assistant

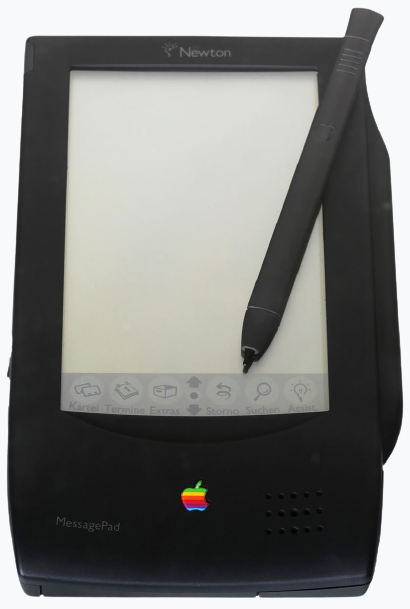
- Apple Newton MessagePad 100
- Manufacturer: Apple Computer
- Released: 1993; 33 years ago
- Introductory price: US$699 (equivalent to $1,558 in 2025)
- Discontinued: 1998; 28 years ago
- Operating system: Newton OS
- CPU: Original/100/110/120/130: ARM610 @ 20 MHz; 2000/2100: StrongARM SA-110 @ 162 MHz
- Memory: RAM: 640 kB–8 MB; ROM: 4–8 MB
- Weight: 0.9–1.4 lb (410–640 g)

The MessagePad is a series of personal digital assistant devices developed by Apple Computer for the Newton platform, first released in 1993. Some electronic engineering and the manufacture of Apple's MessagePad devices was undertaken in Japan by Sharp. The devices are based on the ARM610, a RISC processor, run Newton OS, and all feature handwriting recognition software. Alongside the MessagePad series, Apple also developed and released the eMate 300 Newton device.

== History ==
The development of the Newton MessagePad first began with Apple's former senior vice president of research and development, Jean-Louis Gassée; his team included Steve Capps, co-writer of Mac OS Finder, and an employed engineer named Steve Sakoman. The development of the Newton MessagePad operated in secret until it was eventually revealed to the Apple Board of Directors in late 1990.

When Gassée resigned from his position due to a significant disagreement with the board, seeing how his employer was treated, Sakoman also stopped developing the MessagePad on March 2, 1990.

Bill Atkinson, an Apple Executive responsible for the company's Lisa graphical interface, invited Steve Capps, John Sculley, Andy Hertzfeld, Susan Kare, and Marc Porat to a meeting on March 11, 1990. There, they brainstormed a way of saving the MessagePad. Sculley suggested adding new features, including libraries, museums, databases, or institutional archives features, allowing customers to navigate through various window tabs or opened galleries/stacks. The Board later approved his suggestion; he then gave the Newton his official and full backing.

The first MessagePad was unveiled by Sculley on the 29th of May 1992 at the summer Consumer Electronics Show (CES) in Chicago. Sculley caved in to pressure to unveil the product early because the Newton did not officially ship until 14 months later on the 2nd of August 1993, starting at a price of $699. Over 50,000 units were sold by late November 1993.

== Details ==
=== Screen and input ===
With the MessagePad 120 with Newton OS 2.0, the Newton Keyboard by Apple became available, which can also be used via the dongle on Newton devices with a Newton InterConnect port, most notably the Apple MessagePad 2000/2100 series, as well as the Apple eMate 300.

Newton devices featuring Newton OS 2.1 or higher can be used with the screen turned horizontally ("landscape") as well as vertically ("portrait"). A change of a setting rotates the contents of the display by 90, 180 or 270 degrees. Handwriting recognition still works properly with the display rotated, although display calibration is needed when rotation in any direction is used for the first time or when the Newton device is reset.

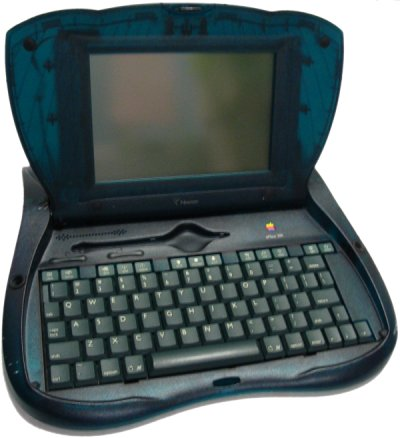
eMate 300

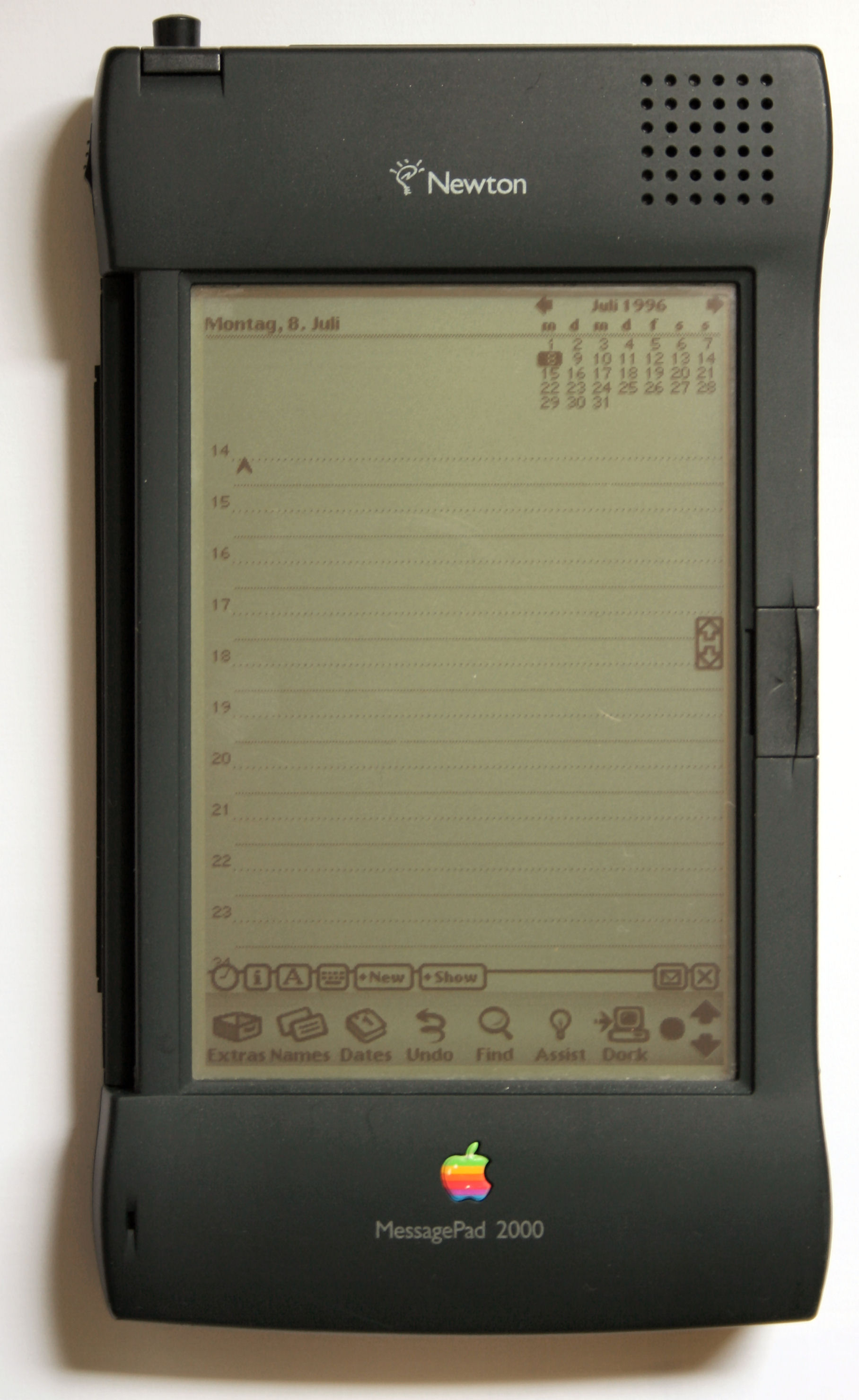
MP2000

==== Handwriting recognition ====
In initial versions (Newton OS 1.x) the handwriting recognition gave extremely mixed results for users and was sometimes inaccurate. The original handwriting recognition engine was called Calligrapher, and was licensed from a Russian company called Paragraph International. Calligrapher's design was quite sophisticated; it attempted to learn the user's natural handwriting, using a database of known words to make guesses as to what the user was writing, and could interpret writing anywhere on the screen, whether hand-printed, in cursive, or a mix of the two. By contrast, Palm Pilot's Graffiti had a less sophisticated design than Calligrapher, but was sometimes found to be more accurate and precise due to its reliance on a fixed, predefined stroke alphabet. The stroke alphabet used letter shapes which resembled standard handwriting, but which were modified to be both simple and very easy to differentiate. Palm Computing also released two versions of Graffiti for Newton devices. The Newton version sometimes performed better and could also show strokes as they were being written as input was done on the display itself, rather than on a silkscreen area.

For editing text, Newton had a very intuitive system for handwritten editing, such as scratching out words to be deleted, circling text to be selected, or using written carets to mark inserts.

Later releases of the Newton operating system retained the original recognizer for compatibility, but added a hand-printed-text-only (not cursive) recognizer, called "Rosetta", which was developed by Apple, included in version 2.0 of the Newton operating system, and refined in Newton 2.1. Rosetta is generally considered a significant improvement and many reviewers, testers, and most users consider the Newton 2.1 handwriting recognition software better than any of the alternatives even 10 years after it was introduced. Recognition and computation of handwritten horizontal and vertical formulas such as "1 + 2 =" was also under development but never released. However, users wrote similar programs which could evaluate mathematical formulas using the Newton OS Intelligent Assistant, a unique part of every Newton device.

The handwriting recognition and parts of the user interface for the Newton are best understood in the context of the broad history of pen computing, which is quite extensive.

A vital feature of the Newton handwriting recognition system is the modeless error correction. That is, correction done in situ without using a separate window or widget, using a minimum of gestures. If a word is recognized improperly, the user could double-tap the word and a list of alternatives would pop up in a menu under the stylus. Most of the time, the correct word will be in the list. If not, a button at the bottom of the list allows the user to edit individual characters in that word. Other pen gestures could do such things as transpose letters (also in situ). The correction popup also allowed the user to revert to the original, un-recognized letter shapes - this would be useful in note-taking scenarios if there was insufficient time to make corrections immediately. To conserve memory and storage space, alternative recognition hypotheses would not be saved indefinitely. If the user returned to a note a week later, for example, they would only see the best match. Error correction in many current handwriting systems provides such functionality but adds more steps to the process, greatly increasing the interruption to a user's workflow that a given correction requires.

==== User interface ====
Text could also be entered by tapping with the stylus on a small on-screen pop-up QWERTY virtual keyboard, although more layouts were developed by users. Newton devices could also accept free-hand "Sketches", "Shapes", and "Ink Text", much like a desktop computer graphics tablet. With "Shapes", Newton could recognize that the user was attempting to draw a circle, a line, a polygon, etc., and it would clean them up into perfect vector representations (with modifiable control points and defined vertices) of what the user was attempting to draw. "Shapes" and "Sketches" could be scaled or deformed once drawn. "Ink text" captured the user's free-hand writing but allowed it to be treated somewhat like recognized text when manipulating for later editing purposes ("ink text" supported word wrap, could be formatted to be bold, italic, etc.). At any time a user could also direct their Newton device to recognize selected "ink text" and turn it into recognized text (deferred recognition). A Newton note (or the notes attached to each contact in Names and each Dates calendar or to-do event) could contain any mix of interleaved text, Ink Text, Shapes, and Sketches.

While the Newton offered handwriting recognition training and would clean up sketches into vector shapes, both were unreliable and required much rewriting and redrawing. The most reliable application of the Newton was collecting and organizing address and phone numbers. While handwritten messages could be stored, they could not be easily filed, sorted or searched. While the technology was a probable cause for the failure of the device (which otherwise met or exceeded expectations), the technology has been instrumental in producing the future generation of handwriting software that realizes the potential and promise that began in the development of Newton-Apple's Ink Handwriting Recognition.

=== Connectivity ===
The MessagePad 100 series of devices used Macintosh's proprietary serial ports—round Mini-DIN 8 connectors. The MessagePad 2000/2100 models (as well as the eMate 300) have a small, proprietary Newton InterConnect port. However, the development of the Newton hardware/software platform was canceled by Steve Jobs on February 27, 1998, so the InterConnect port, while itself very advanced, can only be used to connect a serial dongle. A prototype multi-purpose InterConnect device containing serial, audio in, audio out, and other ports was also discovered. In addition, all Newton devices have infrared connectivity, initially only the Sharp ASK protocol, but later also IrDA, though the Sharp ASK protocol was kept in for compatibility reasons. Unlike the Palm Pilot, all Newton devices are equipped with a standard PC Card expansion slot (two on the 2000/2100). This allows native modem and even Ethernet connectivity; Newton users have also written drivers for 802.11b wireless networking cards and ATA-type flash memory cards (including the popular CompactFlash format), as well as for Bluetooth cards. Newton can also dial a phone number through the built-in speaker of the Newton device by simply holding a telephone handset up to the speaker and transmitting the appropriate tones. Fax and printing support is also built in at the operating system level, although it requires peripherals such as parallel adapters, PCMCIA cards, or serial modems, the most notable of which is the lightweight Newton Fax Modem released by Apple in 1993. It is powered by 2 AA batteries, and can also be used with a power adapter. It provides data transfer at 2,400 bit/s, and can also send and receive fax messages at 9,600 and 4,800 bit/s respectively.

=== Power options ===
The original Apple MessagePad and MessagePad 100 used four AAA batteries. They were eventually replaced by AA batteries with the release of the Apple MessagePad 110.

The use of 4 AA NiCd (MessagePad 110, 120 and 130) and 4x AA NiMH cells (MP2x00 series, eMate 300) give a runtime of up to 30 hours (MP2100 with two 20 MB Linear Flash memory PC Cards, no backlight usage) and up to 24 hours with backlight on. While adding more weight to the handheld Newton devices than AAA batteries or custom battery packs, the choice of an easily replaceable/rechargeable cell format gives the user a still unsurpassed runtime and flexibility of power supply. This, together with the flash memory used as internal storage starting with the Apple MessagePad 120 (if all cells lost their power, no data was lost due to the non-volatility of this storage), gave birth to the slogan "Newton never dies, it only gets new batteries".

=== Later efforts and improvements ===
The Apple MessagePad 2000/2100, with a vastly improved handwriting recognition system, 162 MHz StrongARM SA-110 RISC processor, Newton OS 2.1, and a better, clearer, backlit screen, attracted critical plaudits.

==== eMate 300 ====
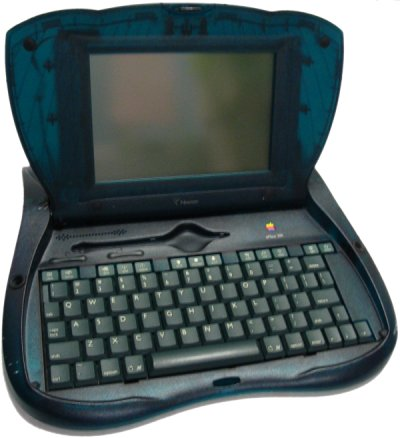
The eMate 300

The eMate 300 was a Newton device in a laptop form factor offered to schools in 1997 as an inexpensive ($799 US, originally sold to education markets only) and durable computer for classroom use. However, in order to achieve its low price, the eMate 300 did not have all the speed and features of the contemporary MessagePad equivalent, the MessagePad 2000. The eMate was cancelled along with the rest of the Newton products in 1998. It is the only Newton device to use the ARM710 microprocessor (running at 25 MHz), have an integrated keyboard, use Newton OS 2.2 (officially numbered 2.1), and its batteries are officially irreplaceable, although several users replaced them with longer-lasting ones without any damage to the eMate hardware whatsoever.

==== Prototypes ====
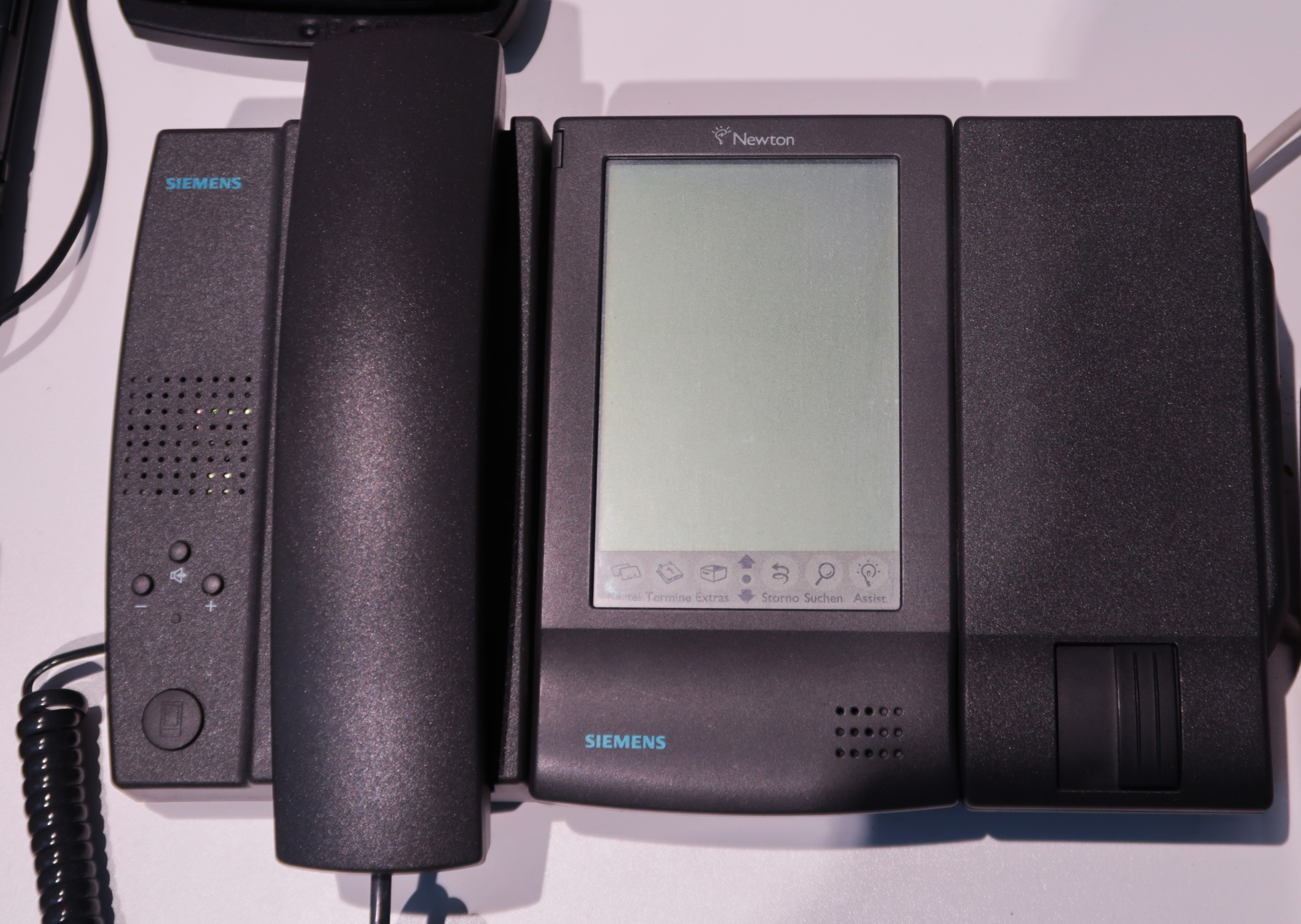
Siemens NotePhone

Many prototypes of additional Newton devices were spotted. Most notable was a Newton tablet or "slate", a large, flat screen that could be written on. Others included a "Kids Newton" with side handgrips and buttons, "VideoPads" which would have incorporated a video camera and screen on their flip-top covers for two-way communications, the "Mini 2000" which would have been very similar to a Palm Pilot, and the NewtonPhone developed by Siemens, which incorporated a handset and a keyboard.

== Market reception ==
Fourteen months after Sculley demoed it at the May 1992, Chicago CES, the MessagePad was first offered for sale on August 2, 1993, at the Boston Macworld Expo. The hottest item at the show, it cost $900. 50,000 MessagePads were sold in the device's first three months on the market.

The original Apple MessagePad and MessagePad 100 were limited by the very short lifetime of their inadequate AAA batteries.

Another factor which limited the early Newton devices' appeal was that desktop connectivity was not included in the basic retail package, a problem that was later solved with 2.x Newton devices - these were bundled with a serial cable and the appropriate Newton Connection Utilities software.

Later versions of Newton OS offered improved handwriting recognition, quite possibly a leading reason for the continued popularity of the devices among Newton users. Even given the age of the hardware and software, Newtons still demand a sale price on the used market far greater than that of comparatively aged PDAs produced by other companies. In 2006, CNET compared an Apple MessagePad 2000 to a Samsung Q1, and the Newton was declared better. In 2009, CNET compared an Apple MessagePad 2000 to an iPhone 3GS, and the Newton was declared more innovative at its time of release.

A chain of dedicated Newton-only stores called Newton Source, independently run by Stephen Elms, existed from 1994 until 1998. Locations included New York, Los Angeles, San Francisco, Chicago and Boston. The Westwood Village, California, near UCLA featured the trademark red and yellow light bulb Newton logo in neon. The stores provided an informative educational venue to learn about the Newton platform in a hands on relaxed fashion. The stores had no traditional computer retail counters and featured oval desktops where interested users could become intimately involved with the Newton product range. The stores were a model for the later Apple Stores.

== Models ==
Newton model comparison
	MessagePad	MessagePad 100	MessagePad 110	MessagePad 120	MessagePad 130	eMate 300	MessagePad 2000	MessagePad 2100
Image								
Code name	Junior	Wedge	Lindy	Gelato	—N/a	Project K, Shay	Q	—N/a
Release date	August 3, 1993	March 4, 1994		January 30, 1995	March 14, 1996	February 17, 1997	March 24, 1997	October 20, 1997
Introductory price	$699	$499	$599	$599	$799	$800	$949	$1,000
CPU	ARM610 @ 20 MHz					ARM710a @ 25 MHz	StrongARM SA-110 @ 162 MHz	
ROM	4 MB				8 MB			
RAM	640 kB	640 kB	1 MB	1 MB (max 2 MB)	2.5 MB	3 MB (max 5 MB)	5 MB	8 MB
Pixels	240 × 336		240 × 320			480 × 320	320 × 480	
Backlighting	No	No	No	No	Yes	Yes	Yes	Yes
Grays	1-bit					4-bit		
Rotation	No	No	No	No	Yes	Yes	Yes	Yes
Serial port	1	1	1	1	1	1	No	No
InterConnect port	No	No	No	No	No	1	1	1
Infrared speed (kbit/s)	9.6	38.4				115 (IrDA)		
PCMCIA card slots	1 × Type II					1 × Type III	2 × Type II	2 × Type II
Keyboard	No	No	No	No	No	Built-in	Optional	Optional
Microphone	No	No	No	No	No	Yes	Yes	Yes
Lid	No	No	Yes	Yes	Yes	Yes	Yes	Yes
Dimensions (L×W×H)	7.25 × 4.5 × 0.75 in (18.4 × 11.4 × 1.9 cm)		8 × 4 × 1.2 in (20.3 × 10.2 × 3.0 cm)			12 × 11.4 × 2.1 in (30.5 × 29.0 × 5.3 cm)	8.3 × 4.7 × 1.1 in (21.1 × 11.9 × 2.8 cm)	
Weight	0.9 lb (0.41 kg)		1.28 lb (0.58 kg)			4 lb (1.8 kg)	1.4 lb (0.64 kg)	
Battery type	4 × AAA		4 × AA			NiMH	4 × AA	
Battery life	14 hours		28 hours				24 hours	
OS	1.0	1.2	1.3		2.0	2.1		

== Timeline ==
Timeline of Newton models

== Third party licenses ==
The Newton OS was also licensed to a number of third-party developers including Sharp and Motorola who developed additional PDA devices based on the Newton platform. Motorola added wireless connectivity, as well as made a unique two-part design, and shipped additional software with its Newton device, called the Marco. Sharp developed a line of Newton devices called the ExpertPad PI-7000/7100; those were the same as Apple's MessagePad and MessagePad 100, the only difference is the physical design (the ExpertPads feature a screen lid, which Apple added in 1994 with the release of the MessagePad 110) and the naming.

== Other uses ==
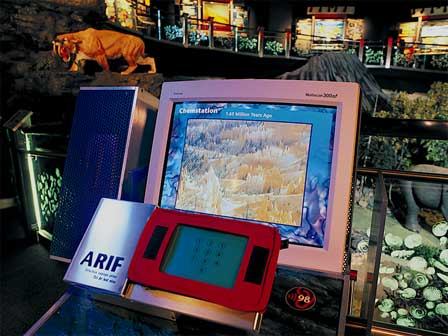
Petrosains uses Newton technology.

There were a number of projects that used the Newton as a portable information device in cultural settings such as museums. For example, Visible Interactive created a walking tour in San Francisco's Chinatown but the most significant effort took place in Malaysia at the Petronas Discovery Center, known as Petrosains.

In 1995, an exhibit design firm, DMCD Inc., was awarded the contract to design a new 100,000-square-foot (9,300 m^{2}) science museum in the Petronas Towers in Kuala Lumpur. A major factor in the award was the concept that visitors would use a Newton device to access additional information, find out where they were in the museum, listen to audio, see animations, control robots and other media, and to bookmark information for printout at the end of the exhibit.

The device became known as the ARIF, a Malay word for "wise man" or "seer" and it was also an acronym for A Resourceful Informative Friend. Some 400 ARIFS were installed and over 300 are still in use today. The development of the ARIF system was extremely complex and required a team of hardware and software engineers, designers, and writers. ARIF is an ancestor of the PDA systems used in museums today and it boasted features that have not been attempted since.

Anyway & Company firm was involved with the Petronas Discovery Center project back in 1998 and NDAs were signed which prevents getting to know more information about this project. It was confirmed that they purchased of MP2000u or MP2100's by this firm on the behalf of the project under the name of "Petrosains Project Account". By 1998 they had invested heavily into the R&D of this project with the Newton at the center. After Apple officially cancelled the Newton in 1998 they had to acquire as many Newtons as possible for this project. It was estimated initially 1000 Newtons, but later readjusted the figure to possibly 750 Newtons. They placed an "Internet Call" for Newtons. They purchased them in large and small quantities.

The Newton was also used in healthcare applications, for example in collecting data directly from patients. Newtons were used as electronic diaries, with patients entering their symptoms and other information concerning their health status on a daily basis. The compact size of the device and its ease of use made it possible for the electronic diaries to be carried around and used in the patients' everyday life setting. This was an early example of electronic patient-reported outcomes (ePRO).

== See also ==
- Apple Newton
- Newton OS
- eMate 300
- NewtonScript
- Orphaned technology
- Pen computing

== Bibliography ==
- Apple's press release on the debut of the MessagePad 2100: "Apple's New MessagePad 2100 Offers Enhanced Performance For Today's Mobile, Information-Centric Users: Newest Member of MessagePad Family Features Increased System Memory, Higher Performance, Upgraded Communications Software" (Press release). MARKHAM, Ontario: Apple Canada. October 20, 1997. Archived from the original on March 4, 2010.
- Apple's overview of features & limitations of Newton Connection Utilities: "Newton Connection Utilities 1.0 for Windows - ReadMe". Apple Inc. December 22, 1997. Archived from the original on December 15, 2007.
- Newton overview at Newton Source archived from Apple: "MessagePad 130: The entry-level handheld computer". Apple Computer, Inc. February 1996. L01722A. Archived from the original on January 28, 2007 – via oldschool.net.
- Newton FAQ: Weyer, Steve; Rand, Peter; Luke, Sean; Guyot, Paul; Padilla, Daniel (March 20, 2003). "FAQ for the Newton Community". Archived from the original on April 8, 2003 – via Victor Rehorst from Newton Resources.
- Newton Gallery: Luckie, Douglass (June 8, 2020). "Newton Gallery!". Michigan State Newton SIG (MSNUG), Michigan State Palmtop User Group (MSPUG). Archived from the original on November 26, 2020 – via Michigan State University (MSU) Cystic Fibrosis (CF) Research Laboratory.
- Birth of the Newton: Hormby, Tom (August 6, 2013). "The Story Behind Apple's Newton". Low End Mac. http://goo.gl/YKSx9L.
- The Newton Hall of Fame: People behind the Newton: Luckie, Douglass (May 13, 2020). "Newton Hall of Fame". Michigan State Newton SIG (MSNUG), Michigan State Palmtop User Group (MSPUG) – via Michigan State University (MSU) Cystic Fibrosis (CF) Research Laboratory.
- Pen Computing's Why did Apple kill the Newton?: MacNeill, David (June 1998). "Why did Apple kill the Newton?". Pen Computing Magazine.
- Pen Computing's Newton Notes column archive: MacNeill, David (April 5, 2008). "Newton Notes Archive". Pen Computing Magazine.
- A.I. Magazine article by Yaeger on Newton HWR design, algorithms, & quality: Yaeger, Larry S.; Webb, Brandyn J.; Lyon, Richard F. (March 15, 1998). "Combining Neural Networks and Context-Driven Search for Online, Printed Handwriting Recognition in the NEWTON". AI Magazine. 19 (1). American Association for Artificial Intelligence: 73–90. doi:10.1609/aimag.v19i1.1355. ISSN 2371-9621. 0738-4602-1998.
  - Associated slides: Yaeger, Larry (September 4–5, 2004). Handwriting Recognition Technology in the Newton's Second Generation "Print Recognizer" (The One That Worked) (PDF). World Wide Newton Conference 2004. Worldwide Newton Conference. Paris, France.
- Info on Newton HWR from Apple's HWR Technical Lead: Yaeger, Larry (February 13, 2006). "Apple-Newton Handwriting Recognition". ShinyVerse. Indiana University. Archived from the original on July 17, 2012.
- Notes on the History of Pen-based Computing: Ward, Jean Renard (March 11, 1992). Notes on the History of Pen-based Computing (Videotape). Uploaded to YouTube by Dan Bricklin (@danbcast) on March 31, 2013; the video is titled "History of Pen-Based Computing - March 1992, Jean Renard Ward". State Corporation / East. "A video of Jean Renard Ward re-creating a talk he gave to a Boston Computer Society special interest group two days before in 1992. This covers many, many devices and approaches in the years before that time. For more info from him, see: users.erols.com/rwservices/biblio.html"
  - This links to: Ward, Jean Renard (September 11, 2023). "History of Pen and Gesture Computing: Annotated Bibliography in On-line Character Recognition, Pen Computing, Gesture User Interfaces and Tablet and Touch Computers". Rueters-Ward / Zurück zur Heimatseite Rüters-Ward. doi:10.13140/2.1.3018.8322. "Mirrors of this page can be found at: ruetersward/biblio.html, users.rcn.com/rwservices/biblio.html, users.erols.com/rwservices/biblio.html, rwservices.no-ip.info:81/biblio.html"
