= Inkwell (Macintosh) =

Handwriting Software for Mac OS

Inkwell, or simply Ink, is the name of the handwriting recognition technology developed by Apple Inc. and built into the Mac OS X operating system. Introduced in an update to Mac OS X v10.2 "Jaguar", Inkwell can translate English, French, and German writing. The technology made its debut as "Rosetta", an integral feature of Apple Newton OS, the operating system of the short-lived Apple Newton personal digital assistant. Inkwell's inclusion in Mac OS X led many to believe Apple would be using this technology in a new PDA or other portable tablet computers. None of the touchscreen iOS devices – iPhone/iPod/iPad – would offer handwriting recognition until iPadOS 14, as a feature called Scribble.

Inkwell, when activated, appears as semi-transparent yellow lined paper, on which the user sees their writing appear. When the user stops writing, their writing is interpreted by Inkwell and pasted into the current application (wherever the active text cursor is), as if the user had simply typed the words. The user can also force Inkwell to not interpret their writing, instead using it to paste a hand-drawn sketch into the active window.

Inkwell was developed by Larry Yaeger, Brandyn Webb, and Richard Lyon.

In macOS 10.14 Mojave, Apple announced that Inkwell will remain 32-bit thus rendering it incompatible with macOS 10.15 Catalina. It was officially discontinued with the release of macOS Catalina on October 7, 2019.
