= MiniCard =

MiniCard, Minicard, Mini-Card or Mini-card may refer to:

- PCI Express Mini Card (a.k.a. PEM, Mini PCI Express, Mini PCIe or Mini PCI-E) by the PCI-SIG, a small form factor expansion card utilizing serial PCI Express and USB interfaces since 2005, primarily used in laptops and handheld devices
- Miniature Card, a flash memory card by Intel and the MCIF in the 1990s
- Visa Mini Card, a Visa Inc. credit/debit/cheque card that is smaller than the usual credit card size. The card has a small hole in it and it is meant to be held on a keyring.

== See also ==
- Mini PCI, a small form factor expansion card, predecessor to PCI Express Mini Card, based on the parallel PCI protocol
