= OneID =

Neustar
- Type: Private
- Industry: Security
- Headquarters: Redwood City, California
- Key people: Steve Kirsch, CEO
- Number of employees: 20+
- Website: https://www.home.neustar/

OneID was a digital security service based in Redwood City, California. OneID sold a digital identity system that claimed to provide security across all devices using public-key cryptography instead of passwords. The technology is utilized by non-profits, such as Salsa Labs, to increase the frequency and security of online donations. OneID now operates as a subsidiary program of Neustar following its acquisition in 2016.

== History ==
The company was founded in 2011 by serial entrepreneur, Steve Kirsch. Kirsch recruited engineers Jim Fenton, Adam Back, and Bobby Beckmann to create the flagship product, which was launched in early 2012. Following the launch, the company raised US$7 million in venture capital financing from Menlo Park-based venture capital firm Khosla Ventures.

Following a growth period in late 2013, the company appointed Kirsch CEO.

In August 2016, OneID was acquired by Neustar. Neustar was later acquired in 2021 by TransUnion.

== See also ==
- Multi-factor authentication
