= Polyworld =

AI life simulation using evolutionary algorithms

- Polyworld Screenshot, 1994
- Stable release: 2.6 / Feb 2015
- Written in: C++, Python
- License: Apple Public Source License
- Repository: github.com/polyworld/polyworld

Polyworld is a cross-platform (Linux, Mac OS X) program written by Larry Yaeger to evolve Artificial Intelligence through natural selection and evolutionary algorithms.

It uses the Qt graphics toolkit and OpenGL to display a graphical environment in which a population of trapezoid agents search for food, mate, have offspring, and prey on each other. The population is typically only in the hundreds, as each individual is rather complex and the environment consumes considerable computer resources. The graphical environment is necessary since the individuals actually move around the 2-D plane and must be able to "see." Since some basic abilities, like eating carcasses or randomly generated food, seeing other individuals, mating or fighting with them, etc., are possible, a number of interesting behaviours have been observed to spontaneously arise after prolonged evolution, such as cannibalism, predators and prey, and mimicry.

Each individual makes decisions based on a neural net using Hebbian learning; the neural net is derived from each individual's genome. The genome does not merely specify the wiring of the neural nets, but also determines their size, speed, color, mutation rate and a number of other factors. The genome is randomly mutated at a set probability, which are also changed in descendant organisms.
