= EMate 300 =

Personal digital assistant by Apple

eMate 300
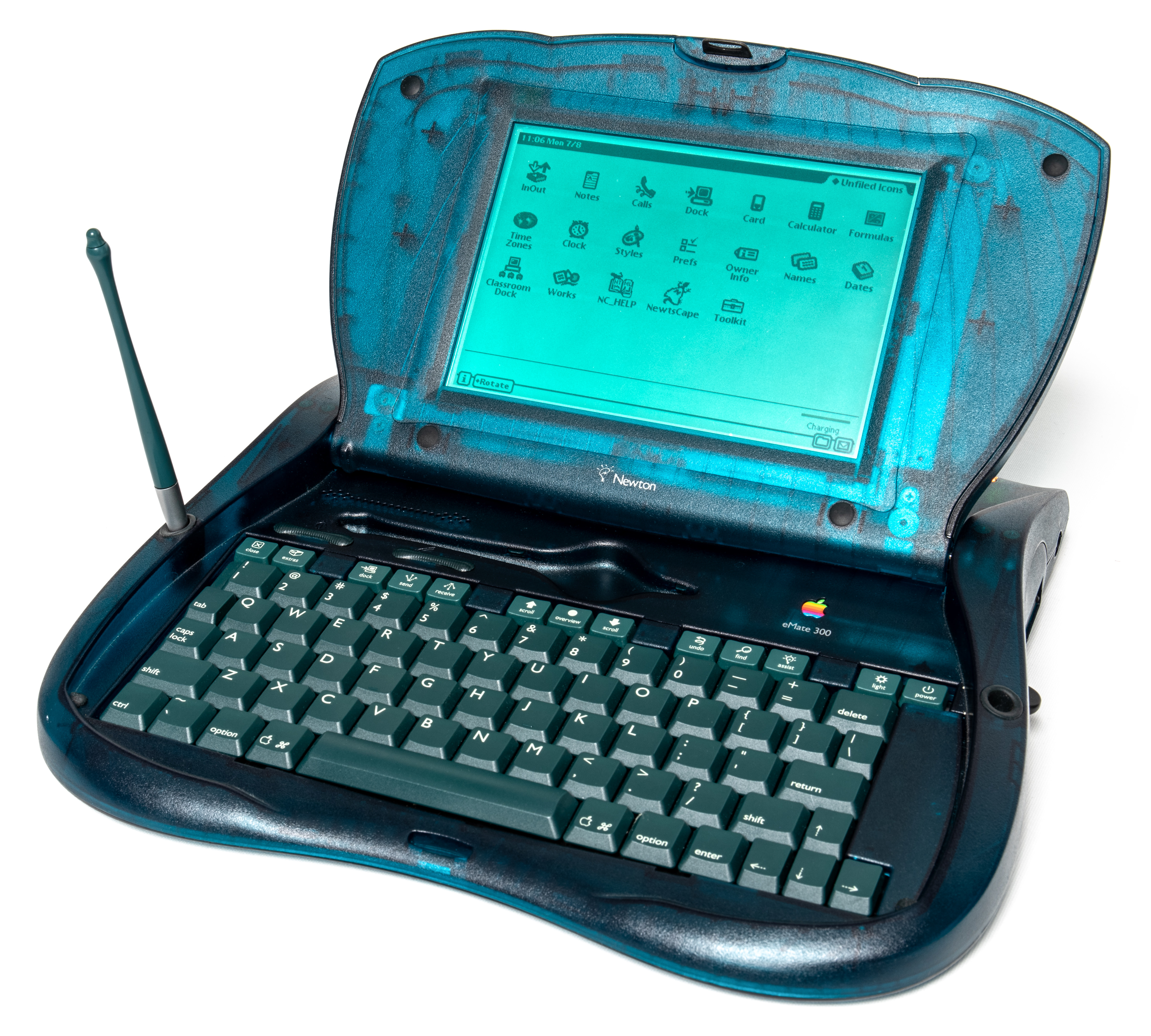
- Apple Newton eMate 300 open
- Manufacturer: Apple Computer
- Type: Personal digital assistant
- Released: February 17, 1997; 29 years ago
- Introductory price: US$799 (equivalent to $1,600 in 2025)
- Discontinued: February 27, 1998
- Operating system: Newton OS 2.1
- CPU: ARM710a @ 25 MHz
- Memory: 1 MB DRAM
- Storage: 2 MB flash memory
- Display: 6.8-inch, 480 × 320 px, 16 grays
- Input: Keyboard and touchscreen with stylus
- Power: NiMH battery
- Dimensions: 12 × 11.4 × 2.1 in (30.5 × 29.0 × 5.3 cm)
- Weight: 4 lb (1.8 kg)
- Related: MessagePad

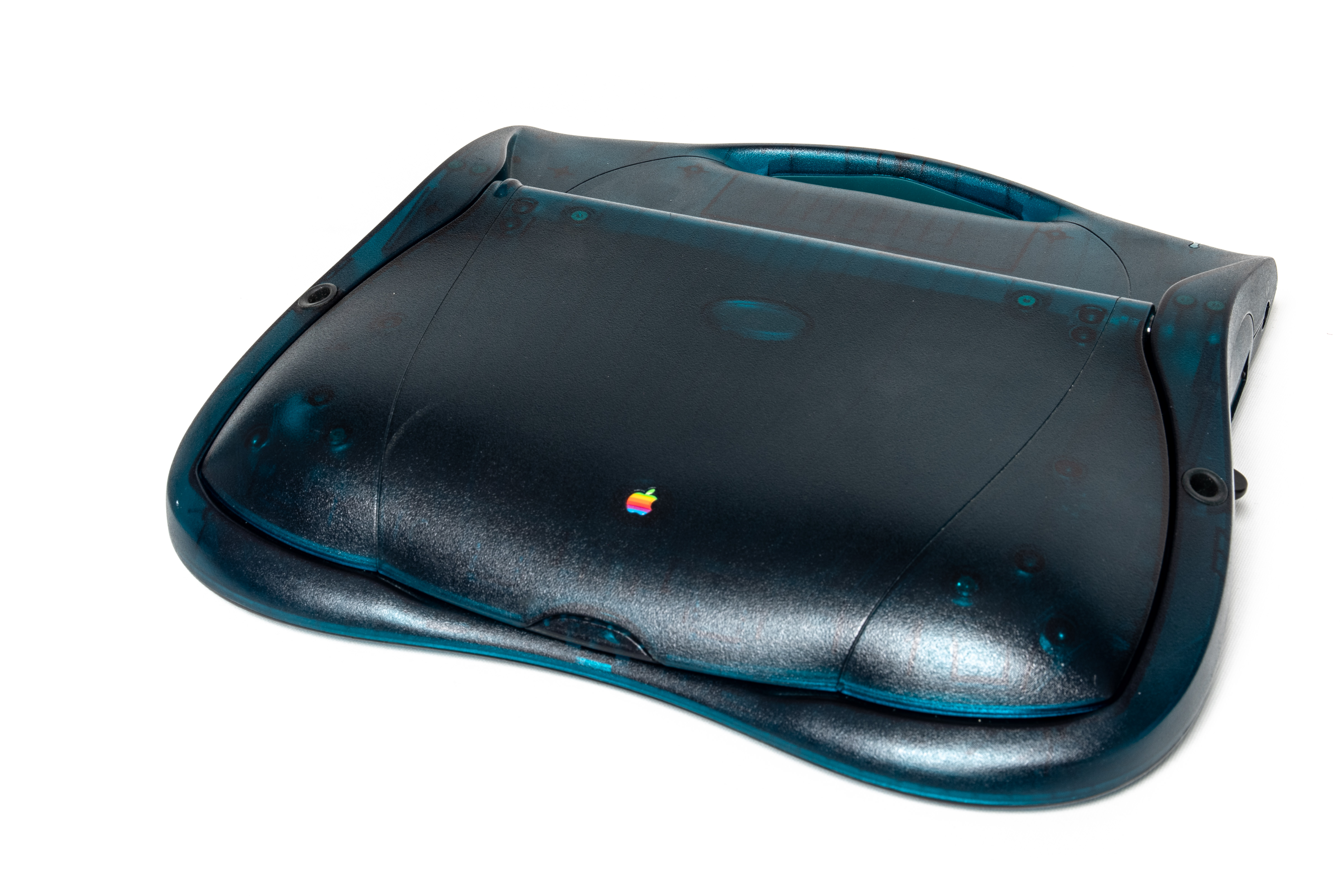
Closed eMate 300

The eMate 300 is a personal digital assistant developed by Apple Computer for the education market. It runs Newton OS and features a built-in keyboard, a touchscreen with stylus input, and a laptop-style clamshell enclosure. Introduced on February 17, 1997, at a price of US$799 (equivalent to $1,600 in 2025), it was the only Newton device with a built-in keyboard. On February 27, 1998, Apple announced that it would discontinue development of Newton OS and Newton OS-based products, including the eMate. The company continued selling its remaining inventory.

== Design and features ==
The eMate 300 has a translucent green clamshell enclosure designed for durability in classroom environments. Its design was developed by the Apple Industrial Design Group, with Jony Ive among the designers involved. The enclosure has an integrated carrying handle that could also be used to secure multiple units with a cable lock. The built-in keyboard is smaller than a standard computer keyboard. When the device is closed, the stylus fits into a cradle beneath the display; two rubber-lined holders beside the keyboard keep it upright when the eMate is open.

The eMate has a 6.8-inch (17 cm) backlit monochrome display with a resolution of 480 × 320 pixels and 16 shades of gray. Users interact with the device through its keyboard and touchscreen, using the stylus for handwriting and on-screen input. It also has a built-in microphone, a headphone jack, and an IrDA infrared port supporting data rates of up to 115 kbit/s. The built-in rechargeable nickel–metal hydride battery provides up to 28 hours of operation on a full charge.

The eMate uses a 25 MHz ARM710a processor, 1 MB of DRAM, 2 MB of flash memory, and 8 MB of ROM. It was slower than the contemporary MessagePad 2000, which had a 162 MHz StrongARM processor, but faster than the outgoing MessagePad 130. The eMate has one serial port, one InterConnect port, and one PCMCIA card slot that supports Type I, Type II, and Type III cards. It also has no disk drives; files could be transferred to Macintosh or Windows computers over a network, cable connection, or infrared link. The PCMCIA slot supports peripherals such as modems, Ethernet adapters, wireless networking cards, and flash memory cards.

The eMate includes security features that restrict students from changing system settings. An optional accessory kit from Knowledge Revolution used probes to measure voltage, light levels, and temperature, with software to transfer the readings to the eMate for use in reports.

Apple produced prototype eMate units in several other colors, including purple, clear, red, and orange, but these versions were not released commercially.

== Software ==
The eMate runs Newton OS 2.1 and includes NewtonWorks, a collection of productivity applications with a word processor, spreadsheet, and drawing program. Other included applications include a calendar, notepad, address book, and calculator, along with utilities intended for classroom use.

== Expansion ==
Unlike the MessagePad line, the eMate 300 has an internal memory expansion slot beneath the battery cover, alongside the ROM card slot. Both slots accept memory cards, although the ROM card is physically larger. Third-party manufacturers, including Newer Technology, produced expansion cards that could increase the system's memory and storage. Some cards also expanded the data bus from 16 to 32 bits.

When a memory expansion card was installed, the internal DRAM was disabled, while the internal flash memory was combined with the card's flash storage. For example, a card containing 4 MB of DRAM and 2 MB of flash memory would give the system 4 MB of DRAM and 4 MB of flash storage.

== Timeline ==
Timeline of Newton models

== See also ==
- AlphaSmart Dana
- iPad
