= Steve Kirsch =

American entrepreneur

Steven T. Kirsch
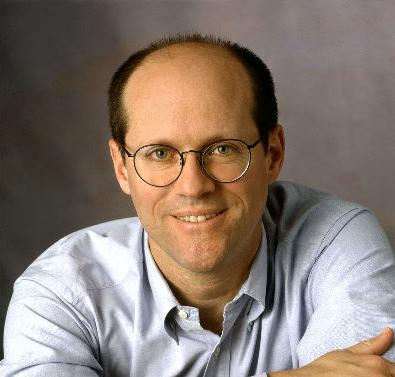
- Kirsch in 2011
- Born: 1956 (age 69–70); Los Angeles
- Education: Massachusetts Institute of Technology

Steven Todd Kirsch (born 1956 in Los Angeles) is an American entrepreneur. He has started several companies and was one of two independent inventors of the optical mouse. Kirsch has been both a philanthropic supporter of medical research, and a promoter of misinformation about COVID-19 vaccines.

== Education ==
Kirsch received a Bachelor of Science and a Master of Science in electrical engineering and computer science from the Massachusetts Institute of Technology in 1980.

== Career ==
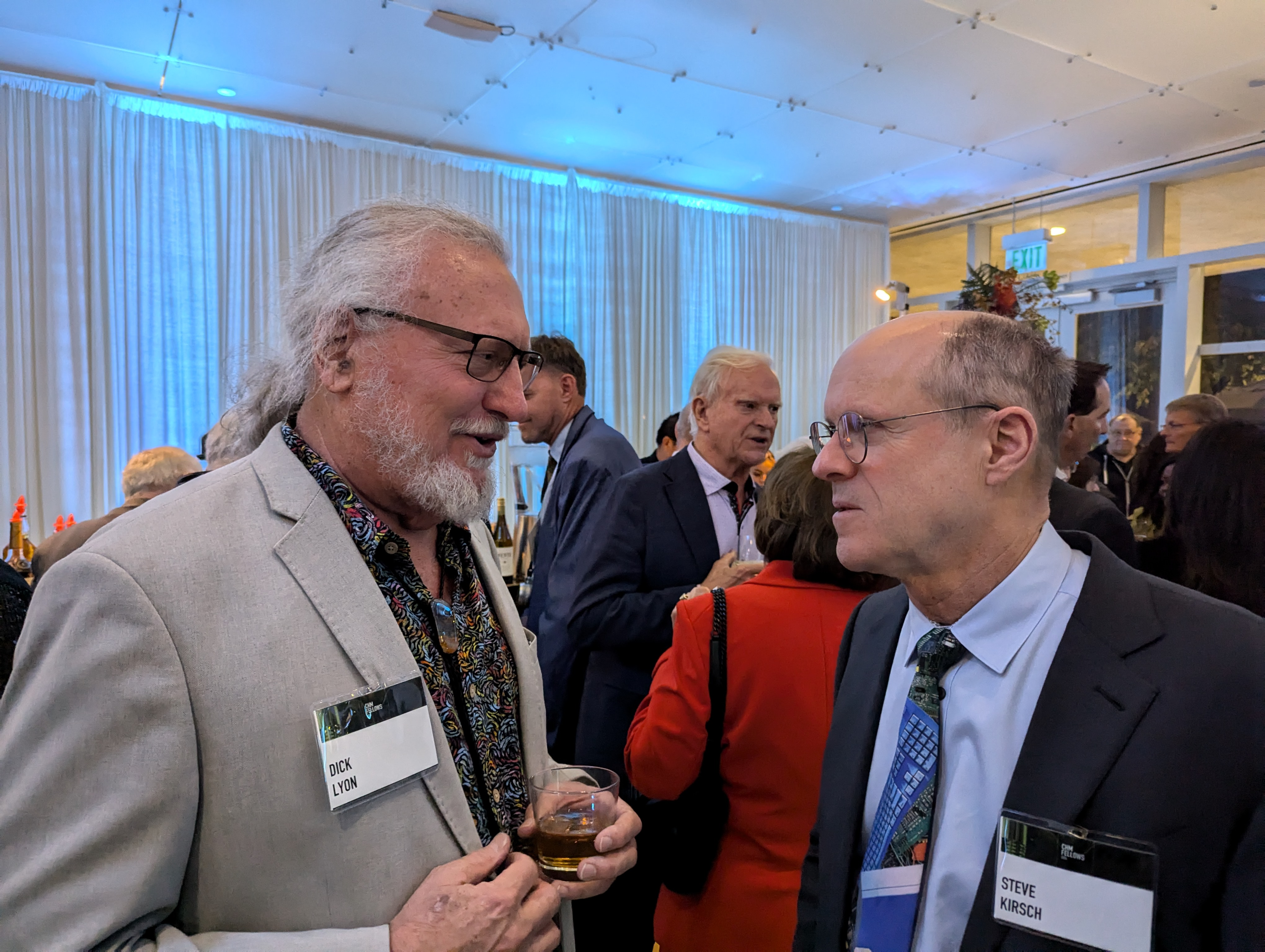
Kirsch (right) with Dick Lyon, the other independent inventor of the optical mouse in 2024

In 1980, Kirsch and Richard F. Lyon independently invented the first versions of the optical mouse. Kirsch has started several companies. In 1993, he founded the search engine Infoseek, which in 1999 was sold to the Walt Disney Co. He co-founded Frame Technology Corp., bought by Adobe in 1995. In 2002 he was CEO of Propel Software.

In 2005 he founded Abaca, which made a spam filter.

In September 2011, he started OneID to create a user-centric Internet-scale digital identity system using public key cryptography to replace usernames and passwords with a digital identity compatible with the NSTIC goals.

Sometime before March 2021, Kirsch started M10, which markets blockchains for banks, but the board asked him to step down in the summer of 2021 amid controversy generated by his statements on COVID treatments and vaccines.

== COVID-19 ==
In April 2020, Kirsch founded the COVID-19 Early Treatment Fund (CETF) to fund research into off-label treatments for COVID-19 among drugs already having FDA approval for other diseases, donating $1 million himself and also fundraising from others. He recruited what MIT Technology Review called "a powerhouse board" of scientific advisors including Robert Siliciano and management by Rockefeller Philanthropy Advisors. By October 2021 the fund had made grants totaling $4.5 million to various researchers.

The fund found a "promising candidate" for further study in fluvoxamine, according to MIT Technology Review. After funding a successful small trial which ended in November 2020, CETF provided further funding for a Phase 3 trial, which as of October 2021 was analyzing data. Kirsch, frustrated that CETF's scientific advisory board was not willing to promote use of the drug based on results of a small preliminary study, wrote a post on Medium titled The Fast, Easy, Safe, Simple, Low-Cost Solution to COVID That Works 100% of the Time That Nobody Wants to Talk About. Medium removed his access to the site, citing misinformation concerns. Kirsch also refused to accept the outcome of a CETF-funded study on hydroxychloroquine, which had found the drug ineffective; he eventually warred with CETF's scientific advisory board over CETF's treatment of both drugs to the extent that in May 2021 all 12 members resigned.

=== Vaccine misinformation ===
In May 2021, Kirsch posted an article online claiming that COVID-19 vaccines affect fertility, while also underplaying the vaccines' ability to prevent illness and death, both statements criticized by fact checkers as being inaccurate and misleading. In September 2021, speaking at an FDA meeting and identifying himself as CETF's executive director, Kirsch claimed that the vaccines "kill twice as many as they save"; the FDA responded that Kirsch had misinterpreted data and that there was no evidence his statement was true. Reuters assessed the claim as false. In March 2023, Kirsch said that he had offered a woman sitting next to him on a first class Delta flight $100,000 to remove her mask for the entire flight. She refused.

In October 2021, Kirsch founded the anti-vaccine group Vaccine Safety Research Foundation (VSRF), which created ads depicting deaths the group attributed to vaccines. Foundation advisors include Robert Malone, Peter McCullough, and Stephanie Seneff. Before this, in June 2021, Kirsch had appeared with Malone on the Bret Weinstein and Heather Heying podcast, which according to MIT Technical Review "introduced Kirsch to followers of the 'intellectual dark web'" and allowed him to access a "large and receptive audience to his claims about a fluvoxamine conspiracy".

== Personal life ==
Kirsch and his wife, Michele, fund a charitable foundation, which by 2007 had given $75 million to different causes. Kirsch also was a noted contributor to Democratic Party related funds. In 2007, his personal fortune was estimated at $230 million; that same year he was diagnosed with a rare form of blood cancer and funded research into experimental treatments for it, eventually refocusing the family foundation on medical research. As of 1998 the couple lived in Los Altos and had two children.
