= Linear Flash =

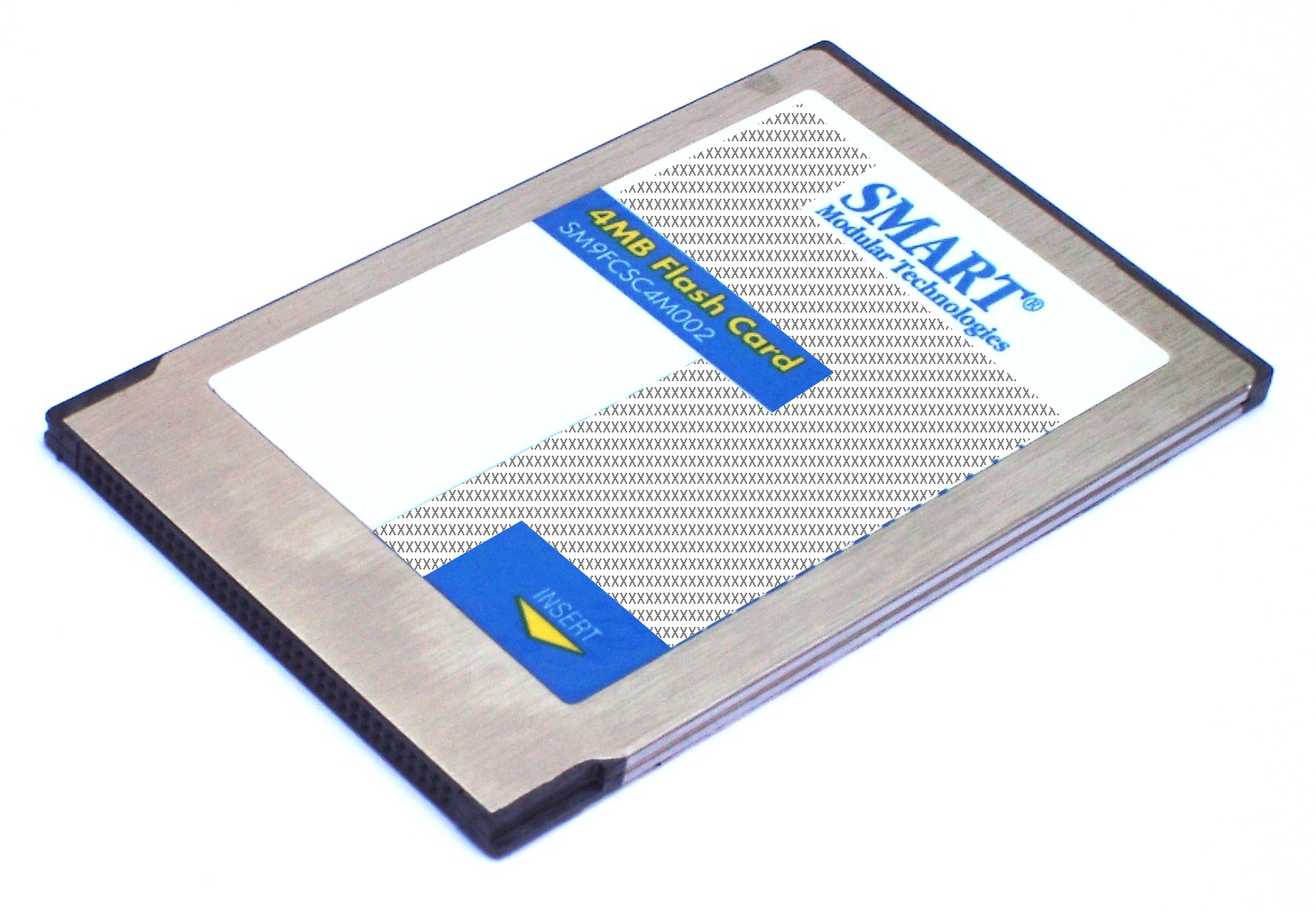
A type I PCMCIA card

Linear Flash is a PC card flash memory format. Linear Flash requires no battery support, unlike somewhat faster SRAM, and features read/write speeds much faster than similar, less expensive ATA-type cards, which include CompactFlash and Memory Stick. Like an SRAM, Linear Flash supports execute in place (XIP) applications in mobile PC and embedded equipment.

Linear Flash can also be read and written to by laptops and desktops with PC card slots, and is somewhat popular for sensitive data storage because the media is non-volatile and does not degrade over time. However, large-scale storage is impractical using Linear Flash because of small card sizes (typically under 40 megabytes) and prohibitive costs; megabyte-for-megabyte, Linear Flash cards are often dozens of times more expensive than ATA cards.

Combined with file management software, such as Flash Translation Layer (FTL) or M-Systems TrueFFS Flash File System, the Linear Flash cards provide removable disk emulation.

As PC Cards (was PCMCIA), Linear Flash cards should have a Card Information Structure (CIS). However, many memory cards do not have a CIS.

Linear Flash cards begin to develop bad blocks after about 100,000 erase/write cycles and thus are of dubious value on the second-hand market.

== Usage ==
Linear Flash cards were also the primary method of data storage for Cisco routers, Apple's Newton MessagePad 100 series and 2000 series PDAs, for some early Magic Cap, Pocket PC and Windows CE PDAs, musical synthesizers, GM Tech2 car diagnostics devices and for many telecom devices.

== Manufacturers ==
A major maker of Linear Flash cards is MagicRAM. Intel, which championed the adoption of the Linear Flash format, also made cards.

== See also ==
- Flash file system
- M-Systems DiskOnChip
- Miniature Card
