= FingerWorks =

Tech company acquired by Apple

- Type: Subsidiary
- Industry: Gesture recognition
- Founded: 1998; 28 years ago
- Defunct: June 2005; 21 years ago
- Fate: Purchased by Apple
- Headquarters: Newark, Delaware, US
- Parent: Apple
- Website: fingerworks.com at the Wayback Machine (archived 2004-04-03)

FingerWorks was a gesture recognition company based in the United States, known mainly for its TouchStream multi-touch keyboard. Founded by John Elias and Wayne Westerman of the University of Delaware in 1998, it produced a line of multi-touch products including the iGesture Pad and the TouchStream keyboard, which were particularly helpful for people suffering from RSI and other medical conditions. The keyboards became the basis for the iPhone's touchscreen when the company's assets were acquired by Apple in early 2005.

== History ==
Westerman was working on a dissertation on chord-based manipulation with a multi-touch surface while a doctoral student at the University of Delaware. He and Elias, a professor in his department, started FingerWorks while he was finishing his dissertation, which formed the basis for some of the company's products. Westerman developed repetitive stress problems while finishing his dissertation, which inspired active focus on low-impact inputs.

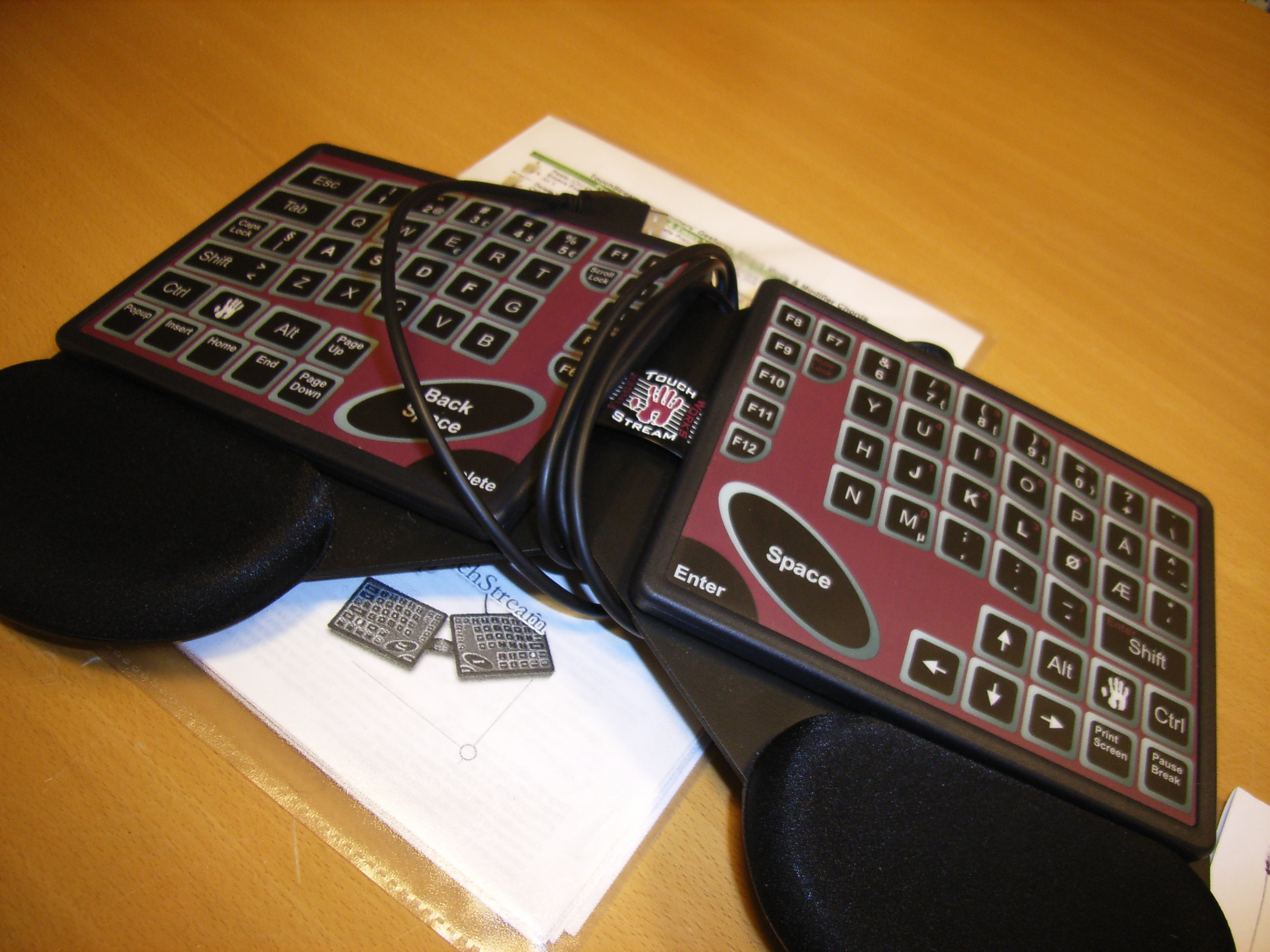
A Fingerworks Touchstream keyboard

The company's products remained a high-end niche, and something of a curiosity, despite good press and industry awards. In early 2005, FingerWorks went through a rocky period, and stopped shipping new products or responding actively to support requests. While they updated their support forums between April and June with new information, outside reports indicated that they had been acquired by a major technology company. This company turned out to be Apple, which acquired the company's patents and other intellectual property along with Elias and Westerman. The technology was used to create the Apple iPhone which launched in 2007.

In June 2005, FingerWorks officially announced they were no longer in business. The founders continued to file and process patents for their work through late 2007. As of August 2008 they still filed patents for Apple.

== Products ==
- TouchStream LP – a full-sized, folding split keyboard, with a flat membrane and zero-force keys. The entire keyboard surface has multitouch support that converts finger movements of different combinations of fingers into mouse and macro events. It comes with chording modes for graphics, Emacs, and gaming.
  Surface inclination: 0-10 degrees; Adjustable split angle & separation
  Active area: 5 by 13 in (13 by 33 cm) Weight: 13 oz (370 g)

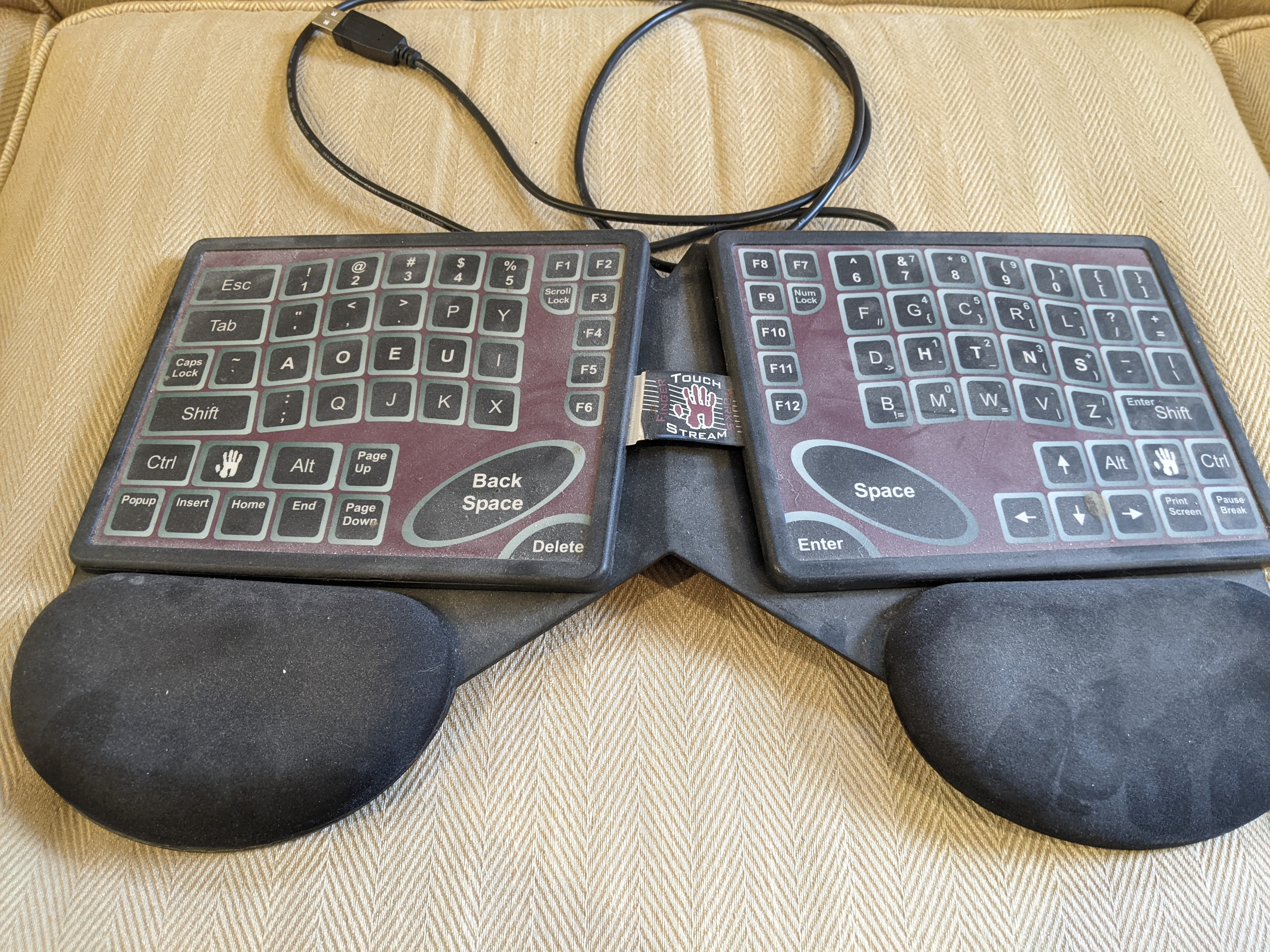
Touchstream keyboard

- TouchStream Mini – a one-hand keyboard + mouse keypad, with 15mm keys (75% normal size). Active area: 5 by 6.5 in (13 by 17 cm)
- MacNTouch – a double-width multitouch surface originally made to physically replace the keyboard in compatible Apple laptops. Also appeared in an enclosure to be used as a separate device, under the name Digitouch.
- iGesture Pad – a one-hand gesture pad for mousing and gestures. Active area: 6.25 by 5 in (15.9 by 12.7 cm)
- iGesture NumPad – like the iGesture Pad but with numeric keypad, PgUp/Dn etc., and arrow keys superimposed.
- iGesture Retro – a one-hand gesture pad embedded into a full-size Microsoft keyboard
