= Apple Newton =

PDA platform by Apple Computer, Inc

Newton

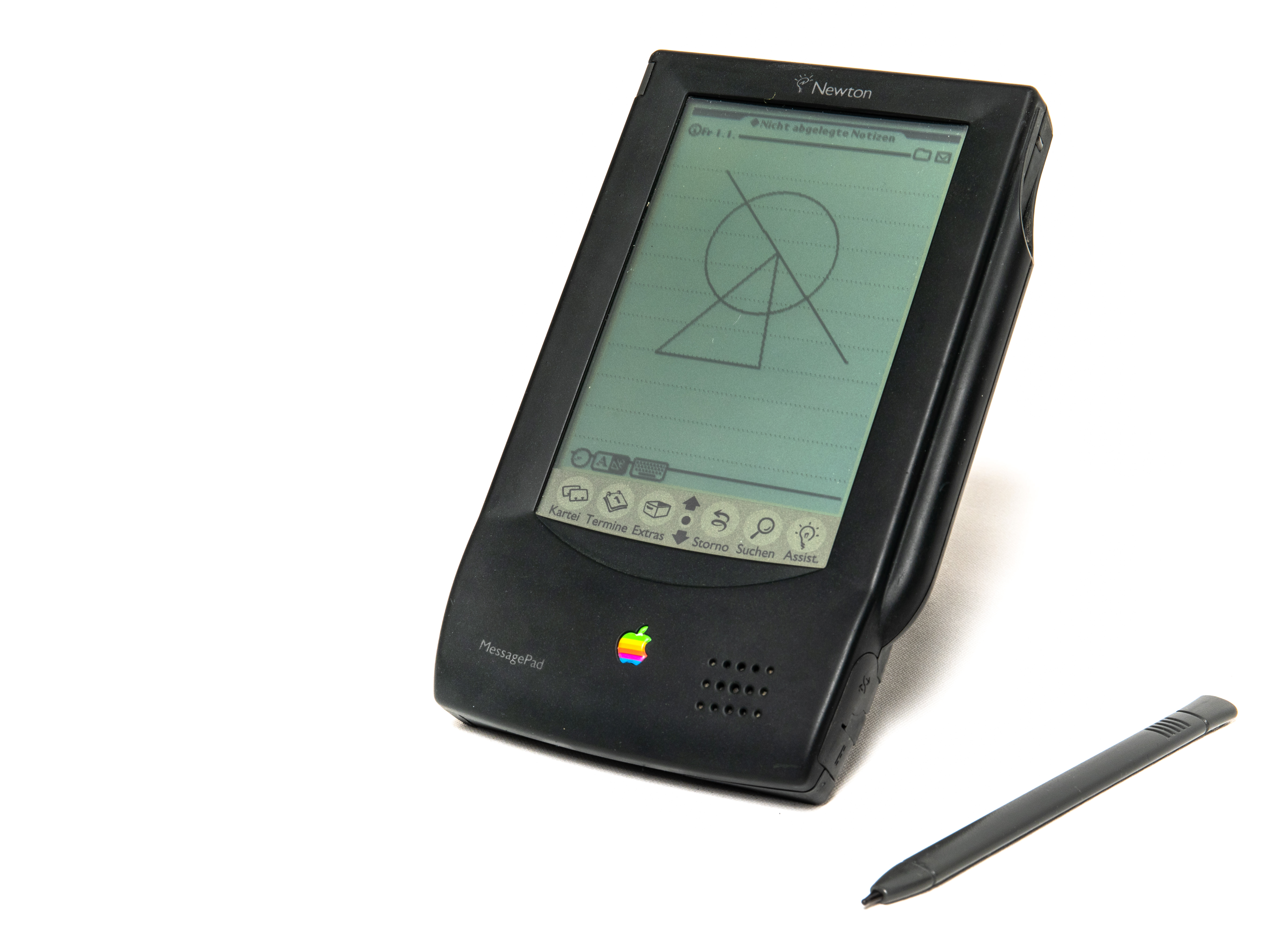
- Apple Newton MessagePad 100, with its stylus
- Developer: Apple Computer, Inc.
- Type: Bar PDA
- Released: August 2, 1993
- Discontinued: February 27, 1998
- Operating system: Newton OS
- Input: Touch screen

The Newton is a series of personal digital assistants (PDAs) developed and marketed by Apple Computer, Inc. from 1993 to 1998. An early device in the PDA category – the term itself originating with the Newton – it was the first to feature handwriting recognition. Newton devices run on a proprietary operating system, Newton OS; unlike the company's Macintosh computers, Apple licensed the software to third-parties, who released Newton devices alongside Apple's own MessagePad line.

Apple started developing the platform in 1987; conceptualized by Steve Sakoman as a tablet-like device with handwriting capabilities, he worked with AT&T Corporation to develop a low-power processor, Hobbit, for the project. However, slow progress and other issues led to Sakoman leaving Apple in 1990 to form Be Computer, Inc. The Newton project would be revitalized by Michael Tchao and Steve Capps who pitched the idea directly to CEO John Sculley; Apple invested in Acorn Computers who developed a specific ARM6-based RISC processor for the device. Apple introduced the Newton on May 29, 1992, and shipments began on August 2,1993.

The Newton was marred with issues before its public release; bugs and software instability played a part in a series of continuous delays of its shipment date, while post-release problems with its handwriting recognition feature led to negative publicity and became a source of mockery. Sales of the Newton were well below Apple's expectations, and despite significant improvements in later hardware and version 2.0 of Newton OS, the platform was discontinued in 1998 at the direction of CEO Steve Jobs. Despite its commercial failure, the Newton was considered technologically innovative for its time and influenced many ideas for Apple's later popular products, the iPhone and iPad.

The Newton was part of Apple's efforts during the 1990s to branch out beyond computers into consumer electronics. Other products from this period included the QuickTake digital cameras, PowerCD, Pippin game console and the Apple Interactive Television Box. None achieved widespread commercial success.

== Product details ==
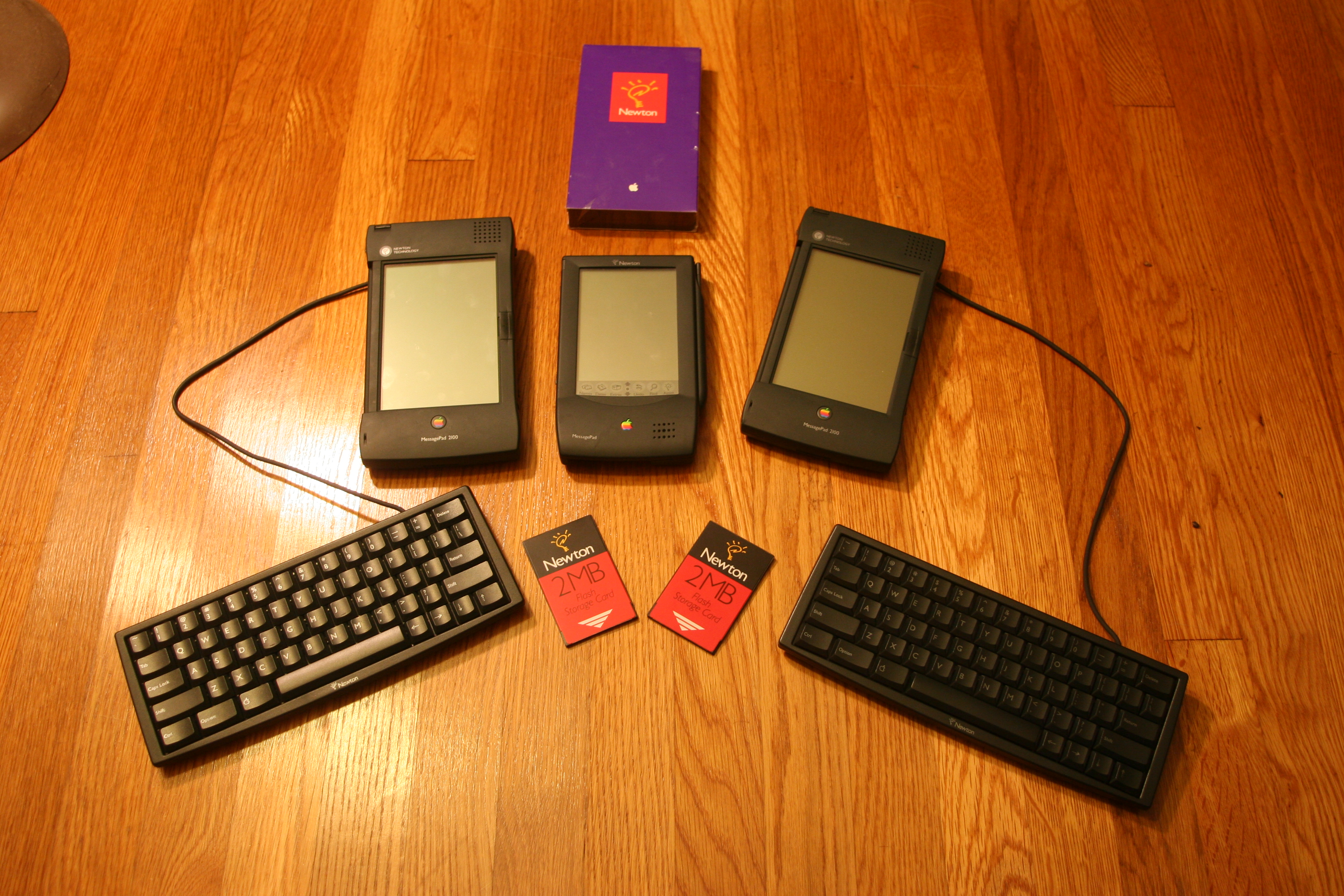
Three Newton MessagePad devices with keyboard and LinearFlash PCMCIA memory card accessories

=== Application software ===
Most Newton devices were pre-loaded with a variety of software to aid in personal data organization and management. This included such applications as Notes, Names, and Dates, as well as a variety of productivity tools such as a calculator, conversion calculators (metric conversions, currency conversions, etc.), time-zone maps, etc. In later/2.x versions of the Newton OS these applications were refined, and new ones were added, such as the Works word processor and the Newton Internet Enabler, as well as the inclusion of bundled 3rd party applications, such as the QuickFigure Works spreadsheet (a "lite" version of Pelicanware's QuickFigure Pro), Pocket Quicken, the NetHopper web browser, and the Netstrategy EnRoute email client. Various Newton applications had full import/export capabilities with popular desktop office suite and PIM (Personal Information Manager) application file formats, primarily by making use of Apple's bundled Newton Connection Utilities and also the Newton Connection Kit, which was sold separately and only worked for Newton devices that used the 1.x versions of the Newton OS.

==== Notes ====
The Notes application allowed users to create small documents that could contain text that had been typed, or that had been recognized from handwriting, as well as free-hand sketches, "Shapes", and "ink text".

Photograph of screen displaying Checklist, some bullet points checked and/or "collapsed"

In version 2.0 of the Newton OS, the Notes application (as well as Names) could accept what Apple termed "stationery", 3rd-party created plug-in modules that could extend the functionality of the basic applications.

One of the new types of Notes stationery added to Newton OS 2.0 was a hierarchical, bullet-ed, collapsible, multi-line "Checklist", an implementation of outliner software. This could be used for organizing tasks, "to do" lists, sub-tasks, etc. Each bullet point could contain as many lines of text as desired. A bullet point could be dragged and placed underneath another bullet point, thus forming a hierarchical outline/tree. When a bullet point was dragged, the entire sub-tree of child bullet points underneath it (if any) would be dragged along as well. If a bullet point had child bullet points, tapping the parent's bullet point once would "roll up" all the children ("windowshade" effect). Tapping the parent bullet point again would make the children re-appear. Because this functionality arrived in Newton OS 2.0, several third parties made similar software before for OS 1.x Newton machines, the most notable of which was Dyno Notepad, released in 1993.

==== Names ====
The Names application was used for storing contacts. Contacts created either on the Newton device or on a Windows or Macintosh desktop PIM could be synchronized to each other. Entering a date in Names for fields such as birthday or anniversary automatically created corresponding repeating events in the Dates application. Each contact had an attached free-form notes field available to it, that could contain any mix of interleaved text, ink text, Shapes, or Sketches. Like Notes, Names could be extended by developers, to create special new categories of contacts with specialized pre-defined fields. Names shipped with three types of contacts, "people", "companies", and "groups", but a developer could define new types, for instance "client", "patient", etc. Stand Alone Software created the Stationery Construction Kit, a Newton software package, which allowed users to make stationery themselves without aid of any other tools.

==== Dates ====
Dates supplied calendar, events, meeting, and alarms functions, including an integrated "to do" list manager. It offered many different display and navigation styles, including a list view, graphical day "time blocking" view, or a week, month, or year grid. As with Names and Notes, Dates items created either on the Newton or on a Windows or Macintosh desktop PIM could be synchronized to each other.

=== Hardware models ===
Apple

- MessagePad (also known as the H1000, OMP or Original MessagePad)
- MessagePad 100 (same hardware as OMP, but newer system version)
- MessagePad 110
- MessagePad 120
- MessagePad 130
- eMate 300
- MessagePad 2000
- MessagePad 2100

Motorola

- Motorola Marco

Sharp

- ExpertPad PI-7000 (equivalent to OMP)
- ExpertPad PI-7100 (equivalent to MP 100)

Digital Ocean

- Tarpon
- Seahorse

Siemens

- Siemens Note Phone

Harris

- Harris SuperTech 2000

=== Operating system and programming environment ===
NewtonScript is an advanced object-oriented programming language, developed by Apple employee Walter Smith. Some programmers complained about the $1000 cost of the Toolbox programming environment. Additionally, it required learning a new way of programming.

Newton OS had a file system, Soup, that enabled flexible ways of storing and retrieving data.

== Models ==
Newton model comparison
	MessagePad	MessagePad 100	MessagePad 110	MessagePad 120	MessagePad 130	eMate 300	MessagePad 2000	MessagePad 2100
Image								
Code name	Junior	Wedge	Lindy	Gelato	—N/a	Project K, Shay	Q	—N/a
Release date	August 3, 1993	March 4, 1994		January 30, 1995	March 14, 1996	February 17, 1997	March 24, 1997	October 20, 1997
Introductory price	$699	$499	$599	$599	$799	$800	$949	$1,000
CPU	ARM 610 @ 20 MHz					ARM 710a @ 25 MHz	StrongARM SA-110 @ 162 MHz	
ROM	4 MB				8 MB			
RAM	640 kB	640 kB	1 MB	1 MB (max 2 MB)	2.5 MB	3 MB (max 5 MB)	5 MB	8 MB
Pixels	240 × 336		240 × 320				320 × 480	
Backlighting	No	No	No	No	Yes	Yes	Yes	Yes
Grays	1-bit					4-bit		
Rotation	No	No	No	No	Yes	Yes	Yes	Yes
Serial port	1	1	1	1	1	1	No	No
InterConnect port	No	No	No	No	No	1	1	1
Infrared speed (kbit/s)	9.6	38.4				115 (IrDA)		
PCMCIA slots	1 × Type II					1 × Type III	2 × Type II	2 × Type II
Keyboard	No	No	No	No	No	Built-in	Optional	Optional
Microphone	No	No	No	No	No	Yes	Yes	Yes
Lid	No	No	Yes	Yes	Yes	Yes	Yes	Yes
Dimensions (L×W×H)	7.25 × 4.5 × 0.75 in (18.4 × 11.4 × 1.9 cm)		8 × 4 × 1.2 in (20.3 × 10.2 × 3.0 cm)			12 × 11.4 × 2.1 in (30.5 × 29.0 × 5.3 cm)	8.3 × 4.7 × 1.1 in (21.1 × 11.9 × 2.8 cm)	
Weight	0.9 lb (0.41 kg)		1.28 lb (0.58 kg)			4 lb (1.8 kg)	1.4 lb (0.64 kg)	
Battery type	4 × AAA		4 × AA			NiMH	4 × AA	
Battery life	14 hours		28 hours				24 hours	
OS	1.0	1.2	1.3		2.0	2.1		

== Development and lifetime ==
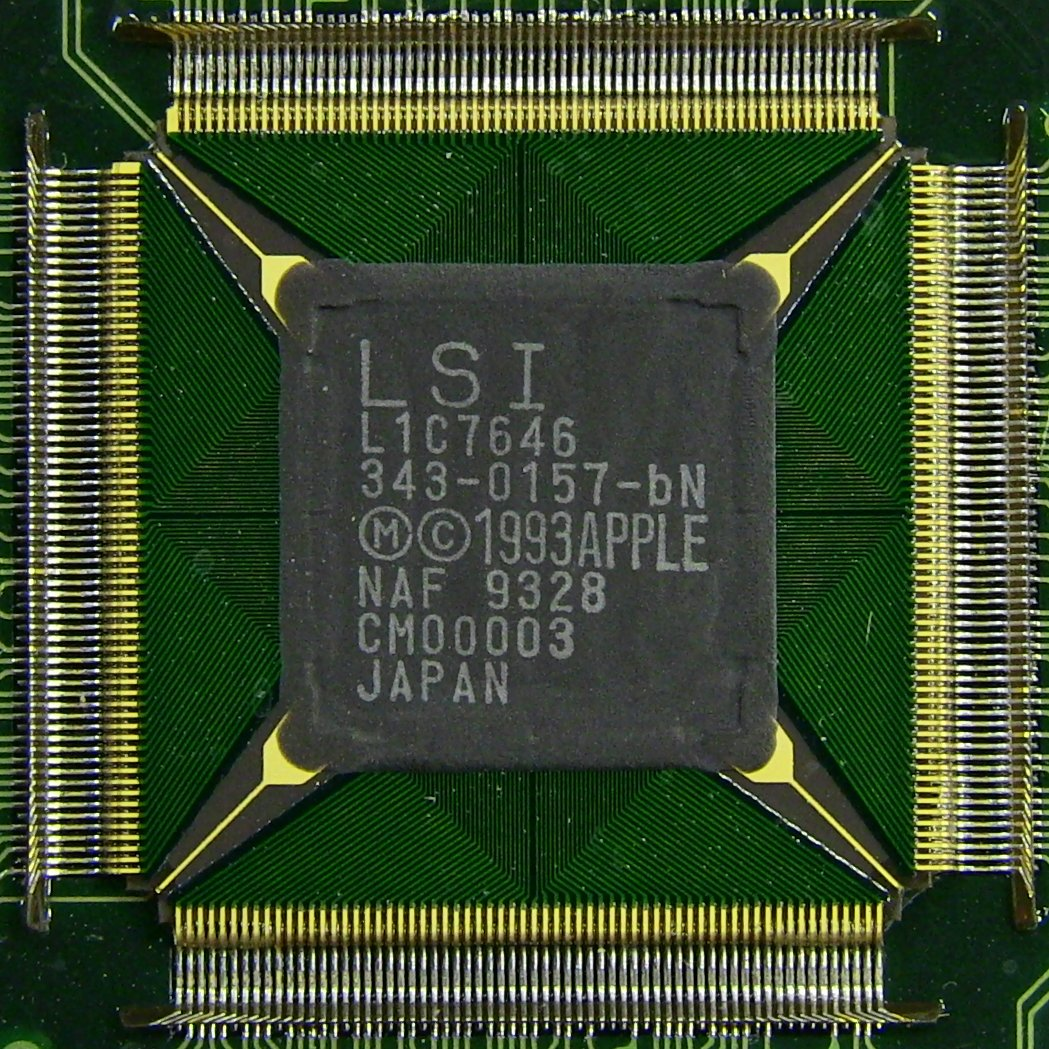
The custom ASIC chip inside the original Apple Newton H1000

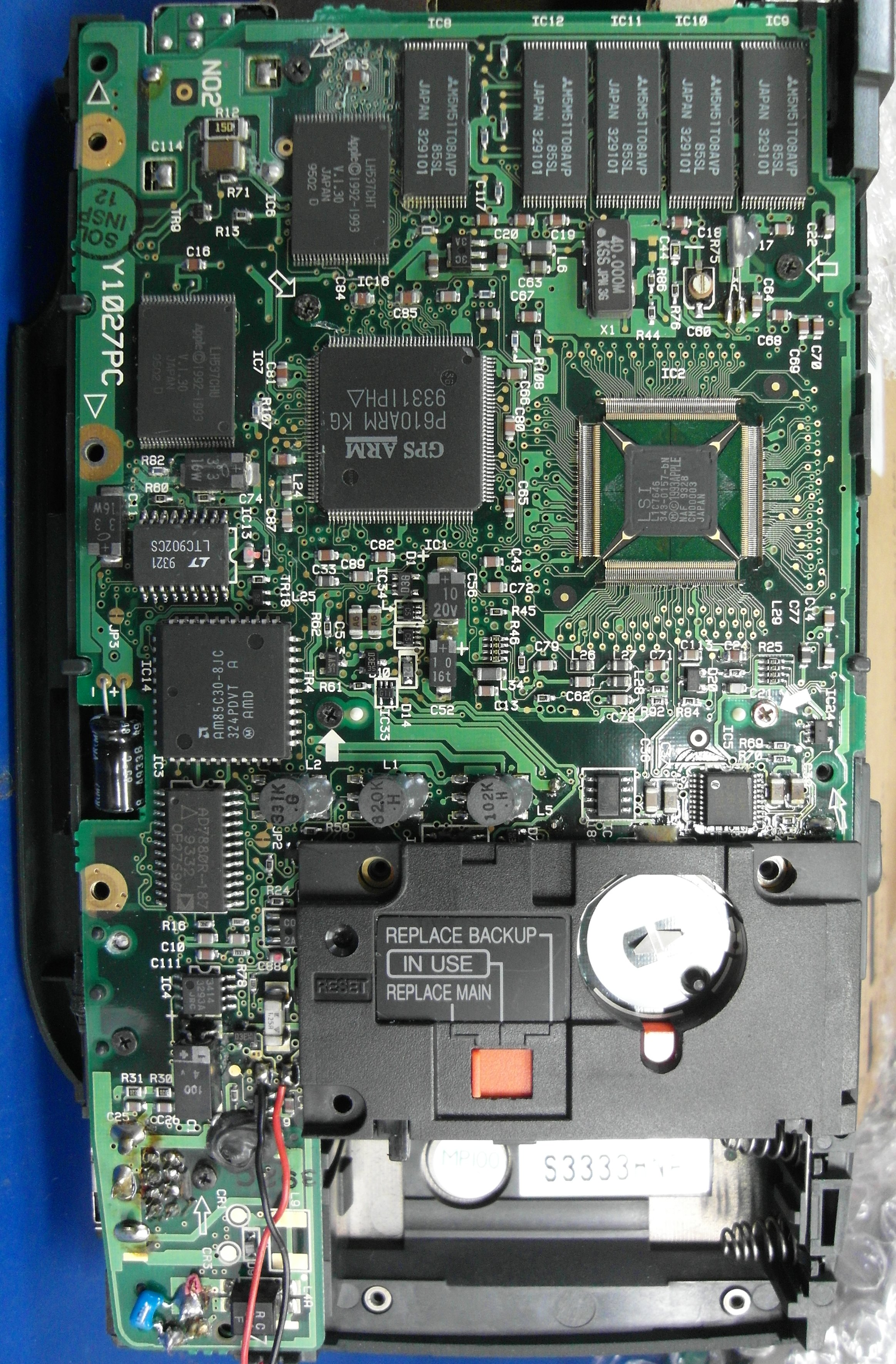
Inside the Apple Newton Messagepad H1000, with back cover removed

The Newton project was a personal digital assistant platform. The PDA category did not exist for most of Newton's genesis, and the phrase "personal digital assistant" was coined relatively late in the development cycle by Apple's CEO John Sculley, the driving force behind the project. Larry Tesler determined that an advanced, low-power processor was needed for sophisticated graphics manipulation. He found Hermann Hauser, co-founder of Acorn Computers which had developed the Acorn RISC Machine as first ARM architecture device, and put together Advanced RISC Machines, now Arm Ltd.

A smaller device was then designed by Jonathan Ive.

Although PDAs had been developing since the original Psion Organiser in 1984, the Newton has left one particular lasting impression: the term personal digital assistant was coined to refer to the Newton.

According to former Apple CEO John Sculley, the company invested approximately $100 million to develop Newton.

=== Release and reception ===
The Newton was considered innovative at its debut, but it suffered from its high price and problems with the handwriting recognition element, its most anticipated feature. The handwriting software was not ready by 1993 and its tendency to misread characters was widely derided in the media. This was parodied in The Simpsons episode "Lisa on Ice", where a scene makes fun of the Newton's handwriting recognition turning "Beat up Martin" into "Eat up Martha". Garry Trudeau also mocked the Newton in a weeklong arc of his comic strip Doonesbury, portraying it as a costly toy that served the same function as a cheap notepad, and using its accuracy problems to humorous effect. In one panel, Michael Doonesbury's Newton misreads the words "Catching on?" as "Egg Freckles", a phrase that became widely repeated as symbolic of the Newton's problems. This phrase was subsequently included as a trigger for an Easter egg in later editions of the MessagePad, producing a panel from the strip when it was entered on the device. In acknowledgement of the strip, Apple subsequently gifted a MessagePad to Trudeau.

Although the software improved substantially in Newton OS 2.0, it was not enough to inspire strong sales.

=== Cancellation ===
The Newton became popular in some industries, notably the medical field. However, the debut of the competing Palm Pilot substantially reduced its market share. Apple struggled to find a new direction for the Newton, and when Steve Jobs returned to the company in 1997, he killed the product line. He was critical of the device's weak performance, the management of the development team, and the stylus, which he disliked as it prevented the use of the fingers. Furthermore, with Apple already suffering heavy losses which jeopardized its survival, this made the unprofitable Newton a tempting target to axe. Jobs was likely also motivated by the fact that the Newton was the pet project of his old adversary Sculley. However, Jobs saw potential in the technology and concept, if not the execution, and eventually led Apple to create its multi-touch devices inspired by FingerWorks, the iPhone and iPad.

== Newton post-cancellation ==
Logo of Newton, Inc.

Before the Newton project was canceled, it was spun off into an Apple wholly owned subsidiary company, Newton, Inc.

Speculation continued for several years that Apple might release a new PDA with some Newton technology or collaborate with Palm. Feeding a bit of speculation, Apple put the "Print Recognizer" part of the Newton 2.1 handwriting recognition system into Mac OS X 10.2 Jaguar. It can be used with graphics tablets to seamlessly input handwritten printed text anywhere there was an insertion point on the screen. This technology, known as Inkwell, appears in the System Preferences whenever a tablet input device is plugged in. Larry Yaeger was the author of the original Rosetta recognizer on the Newton, and he was also responsible for porting it to Mac OS X. Patent applications were issued for a tablet based Macintosh. At an All Things Digital conference in 2004, Steve Jobs made reference to a new "Apple PDA" which the company had developed but had decided not to bring to market.

In September 2009, Michael Tchao, who pitched the original Newton concept to John Sculley, returned to Apple. (Note: Tchao later became VP of iPad Product Marketing.)

=== Emulation ===
Since 2004, the Einstein Project has been working on emulating the Newton for use as an alternative OS on other platforms. It is currently available for the Sharp Zaurus, Apple's Mac OS X, Nokia Maemo, Microsoft Windows, and the Pepper Pad 3. The emulator is an open source project, but requires an original Newton ROM to be installed in order to function. iPhones and iPads run Einstein since September 2010. The Android operating system runs Einstein since March 2011.

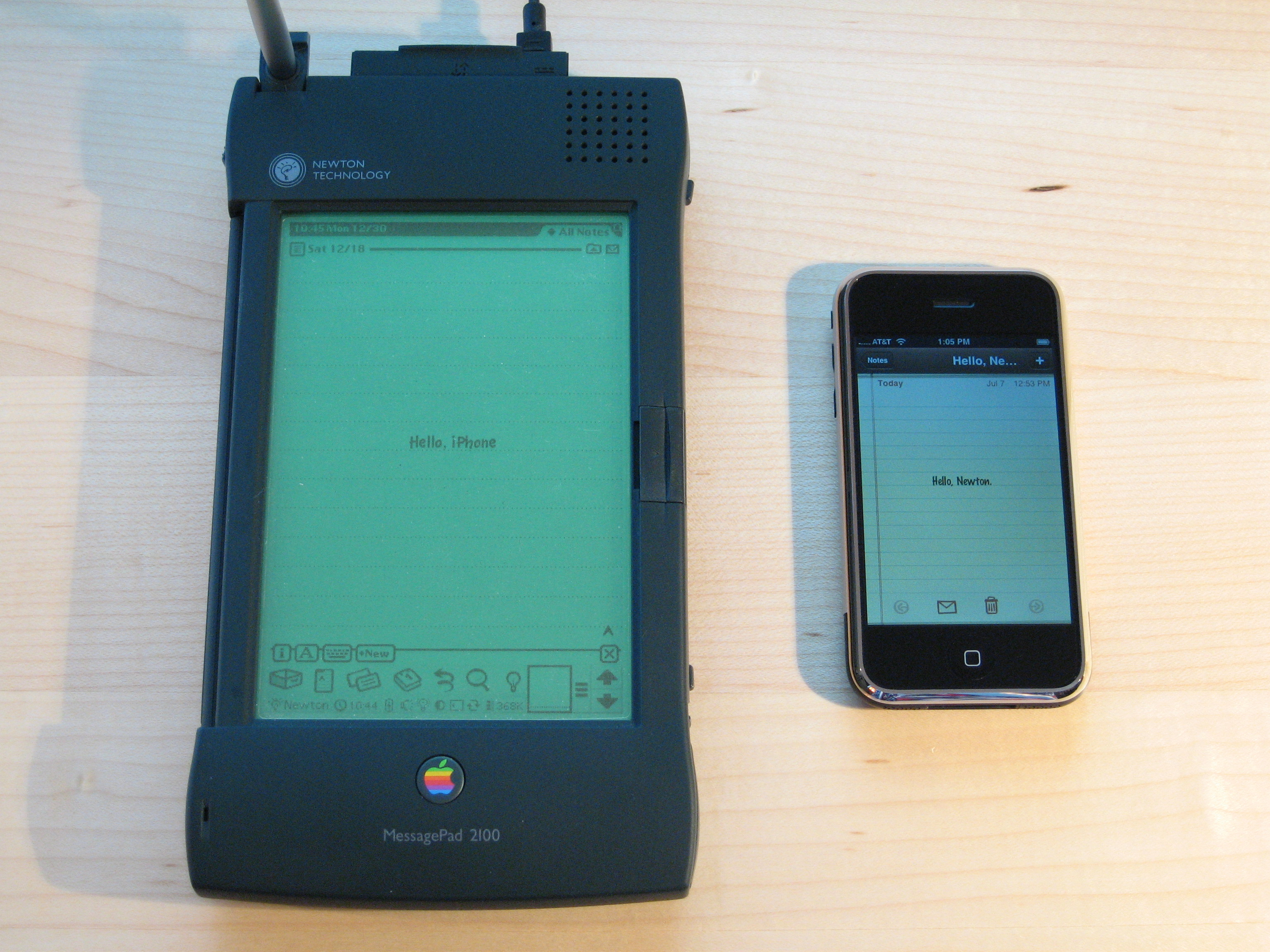
The Apple Newton MessagePad 2100, a 1997 model, running Newton OS, alongside the original iPhone from 2007 running iOS

=== Software development ===
Programs have been written for the Newton since its cancellation, including an RSS reader.

== In popular culture ==
The Apple Newton and its poor handwriting recognition was lampooned on season six Simpsons episode "Lisa on Ice", when Kearney (one of the three teenaged thugs/school bullies) tells Dolph to take a memo on his Newton to "Beat up Martin," and the message comes up as "Eat up Martha", to which a frustrated Kearney throws the Newton away in disgust, hitting Martin Prince.

In the 1995 anime series Neon Genesis Evangelion, handheld devices modeled on the Newton can be seen multiple times, serving various internal functions within NERV.

In the 1995 film Under Siege 2: Dark Territory, the main character Casey Ryback (Steven Seagal) connects an Apple Newton PDA to the telephone network of the hijacked train on which the film is set, and sends a fax to his workplace, which is then forwarded to Admiral Bates, Ryback's contact at the Pentagon. The hijackers subsequently discover and hack the Newton, thus learning of Ryback's presence on the train.

In the 1996-98 TV action series F/X: The Series, the Messagepad 2000 is featured as the hero's daily PDA. However, the monochrome screen has been technically overdubbed with a colour screen crafted especially for this purpose. The actor Cameron Daddo carries it around with him in the side pocket of his cargo pants and uses it frequently to control his gadgets or devices and to communicate with databases.

In the 1998 interactive video game The X-Files Game, the main character uses an Apple Newton to make notes, read e-mail and navigate the different locations of the game.

During Apple's March 21, 2016, keynote conference, a celebration video called "40 Years in 40 Seconds" was unveiled. The video featured flashing text of names from Apple's most notable products and taglines in their forty-year history, including Newton. However, in Newton's case, it was the only name depicted in the video being explicitly scratched out, mimicking how users deleted text on the device, and referencing the full cancellation of the product line.

In the TV series For All Mankind season 3, episode 1, an alternative 1992 history Newton MessagePad with backlit (possibly color) display is shown at a briefing scene. Season 5 of the series depicts everyone using the fictional Apple Newton smartphone.
