= Motorola Marco =

Personal digital assistant released in 1995

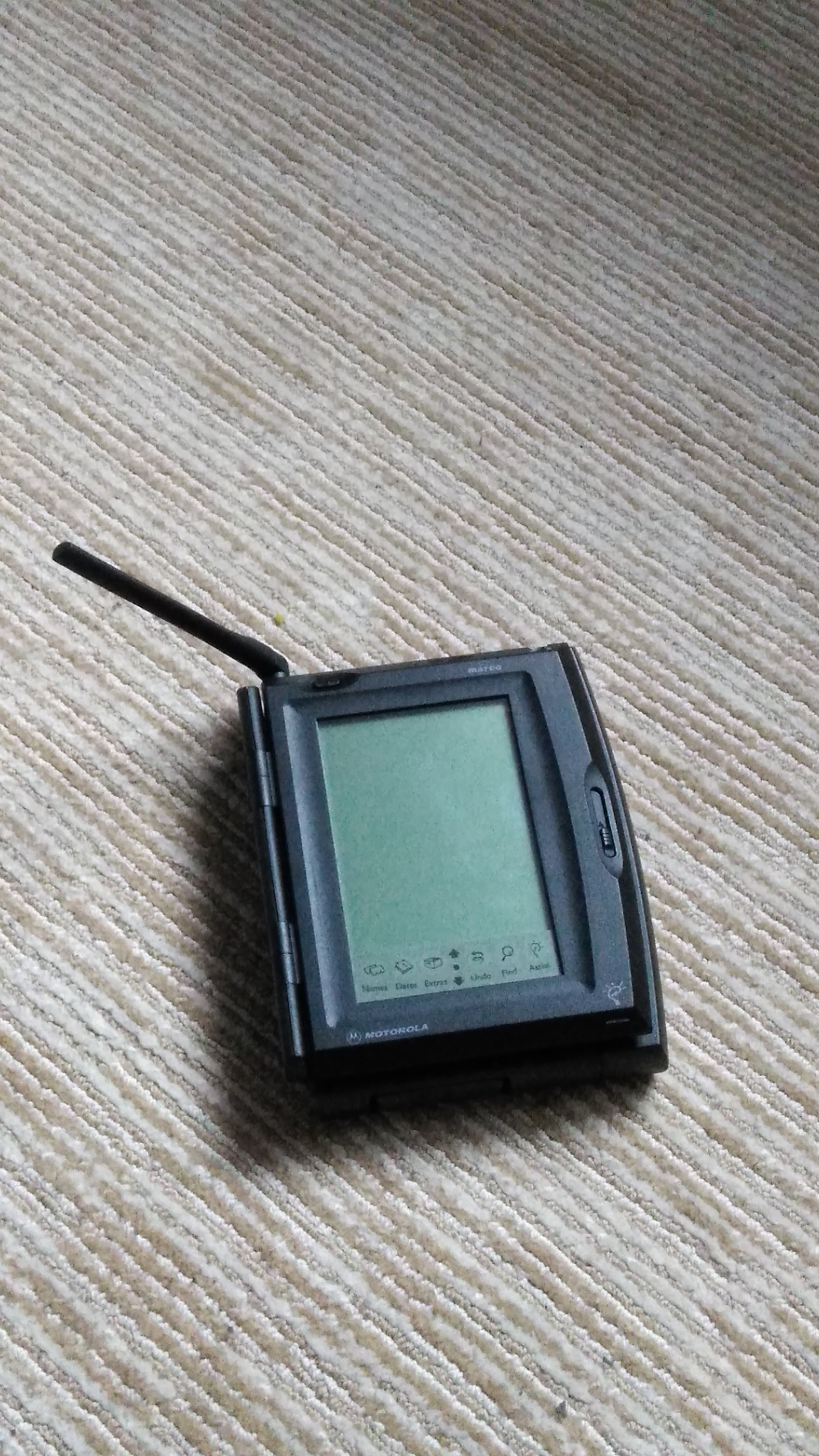
- Motorola Marco
- Developer: Motorola
- Manufacturer: Motorola
- Type: Personal digital assistant
- Released: 1995; 31 years ago
- Operating system: Newton OS

The Motorola Marco was a Newton OS-based personal digital assistant from Motorola, launched in January 1995 at MacWorld. It was unique in that it included a compatible RadioMail and ARDIS network radio, which allowed users to check and send e-mail as well as receive and send text messages.

In 2007, Motorola dusted off the Marco moniker and used it as the name for a new cell phone line.

== Hardware specifications ==
The Marco was a substantially modified form of the MessagePad 120 in a custom case with wireless capabilities. It had a similar 20 MHz ARM 610 processor with a modified five MB ROM and one Mbyte of static RAM. Newton OS 1.3 consumed 544 kbyte, leaving 480 kbyte for user data. Storage could be supplemented using the PCMCIA Type II port. It had a monochrome LC screen with 320 × 240 pixels.
