= Miniature Card =

Memory card format

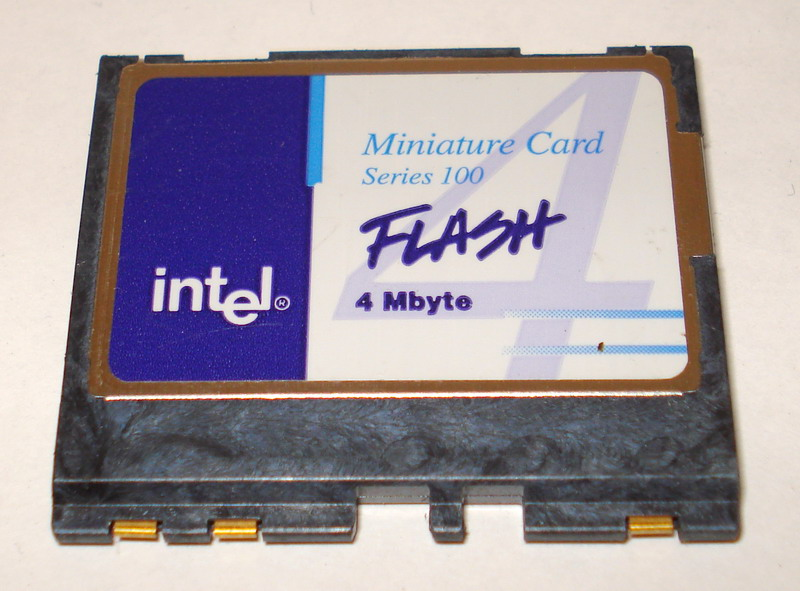
Miniature Card

The Miniature Card or MiniCard is a flash or SRAM memory card standard first promoted by Intel in 1995. The card was backed by Advanced Micro Devices, Fujitsu and Sharp Electronics. They are no longer manufactured. The Miniature Card Implementers Forum (MCIF) promoted this standard for consumer electronics, such as PDAs and palmtops, digital audio recorders, digital cameras and early smartphones. The Miniature Card is 37 × 45 × 3.5 mm thick and can have devices on both sides of the substrate. Its 60-pin connector was a memory-only subset of PCMCIA and featured 16-bit data and 24-bit address bus with 3.3 or 5-volt signaling. Miniature Cards support Attribute Information Structure (AIS) in the I²C identification EEPROM.

The Miniature Card format competed with SmartMedia and CompactFlash cards, also released during the mid-1990s, and the earlier, larger Type I PC Cards. Ultimately, CompactFlash and SmartMedia cards were more successful in the consumer electronics market.

Olympus Digital Voice Recorder D1000 and the digital camera HP Photosmart uses the Miniature Card. Also Philips Velo 500 PDAs and CISCO 800 and 1700 used Miniature Cards.

== See also ==
- Linear Flash
