= Newton OS =

Discontinued operating system by Apple Inc

- Screenshot of Newton OS 2.0
- Developer: Apple Computer, Inc.
- Written in: C++
- Working state: Historical
- Source model: Closed source
- Initial release: 3 August 1993; 33 years ago
- Final release: 2.1 / 21 March 1997; 29 years ago
- Supported platforms: ARM
- Kernel type: Microkernel
- Default user interface: GUI
- License: Proprietary EULA

Newton OS is a discontinued operating system for the Apple Newton PDAs produced by Apple Computer, Inc. between 1993 and 1997. It was written entirely in C++ and trimmed to be low power consuming and use the available memory efficiently. Many applications were pre-installed in the ROM of the Newton (making for quick start-up) to save on RAM and flash memory storage for user applications.

== Features ==
Newton OS features many interface elements that the Macintosh system software didn't have at the time, such as drawers and the "poof" animation. An animation similar to this is found in Mac OS X, and parts of the Newton's handwriting recognition system have been implemented as Inkwell in Mac OS X.

- Sound-responsive – Clicking menus and icons makes a sound; this feature was later introduced in Mac OS 8.
- Icons – Similar to the Macintosh Desktop metaphor, Newton OS uses icons to open applications.
- Tabbed documents – Similar to tabbed browsing in today's browsers and Apple's At Ease interface, documents titles appear in a small tab at the top right hand of the screen.
- Screen rotation – In Newton 2.0, the screen can be rotated to be used for drawing or word processing.
- File documents – Notes and Drawings can be categorized. E.g. Fun, Business, Personal, etc.
- Print documents – Documents on the Newton can be printed.
- Send documents – Documents can be sent to another Newton via Infrared technology or sent using the Internet by E-Mail, or faxed.
- Menus – Similar to menus seen in Mac OS, but menu titles are instead presented at the bottom of the screen in small rectangles, making them similar to buttons with attached "pop-up" menus.

Many features of the Newton are best appreciated in the context of the history of pen computing.

== Software ==
Shortly after the Newton PDA's release in 1993, developers were not paying much attention to the new Newton OS API and were still more interested in developing for the Macintosh and Windows platforms. It was not until two years later that developers saw a potential market available to them in creating software for Newton OS. Several programs were made by third-party developers, including software to enhance the disappointing hand writing recognition technology of Newton OS 1.x.

The basic software that came with Newton OS:

- Works – A program for drawing and word processing, with typical capabilities such as: rulers, margins, page breaks, formatting, printing, spell-checking and find-and-replace tools.
- Notes – Used for checklists, as well as both drawing and writing in the same program either with a newton keyboard or a stylus pen.
- Dates – Calendar program where you can schedule appointments and other special events.
- Names – Program for storing extensive contacts information in a flexible format.
- Formulas – Program that offers metric conversions, currency conversions, loan and mortgage calculators, etc.
- Calculator – A basic calculator with square root, percentage, MR, M+ and M− functions additional to the basic functions found on a calculator.
- Clock – A small floating window type application, known as a desktop accessory on the Macintosh. The Newton clock also includes features for an alarm, minute timer and the date.
- Book Reader – Support for displaying electronic books is built in.

== Version history ==
Date released	OS version
3 August 1993	1.0
30 October 1993	1.1
?	1.2
4 March 1994	1.3
14 March 1996	2.0
21 March 1997	2.1

== Handwriting recognition ==
The Newton uses the CalliGrapher word-based handwriting recognition engine developed by ParaGraph International Inc, led by former Soviet scientist Stepan Pachikov.

The earliest versions had weaknesses that resulted in bad publicity and reviews. However, with the release of Newton PDAs based upon version 2.0 of the OS, the handwriting recognition substantially improved, partially being a product of ParaGraph and an Apple-created recognizer pair: Apple's Rosetta and Mondello. Newton's handwriting recognition, particularly the print recognizer, has been considered by many reviewers, testers, and users to be the best in the industry, even 10 years after it was introduced. It was developed by Apple's Advanced Technology Group, and was described in 2012 as "the world's first genuinely usable handwriting recognition system".

The Newton can recognize hand-printed text, cursive, or a mix of the two, and can also accept free-hand "Sketches", "Shapes", and "ink text". Text can also be entered by tapping with the stylus on a small on-screen pop-up QWERTY keyboard. With "Shapes", Newton can recognize that the user was attempting to draw a circle, a line, a polygon, etc., and it cleans them up into "perfect" vector representations (with modifiable control points and defined vertices) of what the user is attempting to draw. "Shapes" and "Sketches" can be scaled or deformed once drawn. "Ink text" captures the user's free-hand writing but allows it to be treated somewhat like recognized text when manipulating for later editing purposes ("ink text" supported word wrap, could be formatted to be bold, italic, etc.). At any time a user can also direct the Newton to recognize selected "ink text" and turn it into recognized text (deferred recognition). A Newton Note document (or the notes attached to each contact in Names and each calendar event) can contain any mix of interleaved text, ink text, Shapes, and Sketches.

== NewtonScript ==
Newton OS runs applications written in C++, along with an interpreted, user-friendly language called NewtonScript. These applications are stored in packages.

== Timeline ==
Timeline of Newton models

== See also ==
- Apple Newton
- eMate 300
- Pen computing
- iOS
- Motorola Marco

== Notes ==
- A selection of PDFs of Apple's Newton manuals
- Newton FAQ
- Pen Computing's First Look at Newton OS 2.0
- The Newton Hall of Fame: People behind the Newton
- Pen Computing's Why did Apple kill the Newton?
- Pen Computing's Newton Notes column archive
- A.I. Magazine article by Yaeger on Newton handwriting recognition design, algorithms, & quality and associated slides
- Info on Newton handwriting recognition from Apple's handwriting recognition Technical Lead
