= Larry Yaeger =

American informatician and software designer

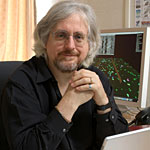
Larry Yaeger in 2005, with Polyworld running in the background

Larry Steven Yaeger (born 1950) is a former Apple Distinguished Scientist and Full Professor of Informatics at Indiana University Bloomington, currently employed at Google. Outside of academia he is best known for designing the handwriting recognition software used in the Apple Newton and Inkwell. Yaeger's academic research focused on the evolution of true artificial intelligence through natural selection. He is the lead developer of Polyworld.
