= Venu Govindaraju =

Indian academic

Senior Vice President for Research, Innovation and Economic Development Chief AI Officer SUNY Distinguished Professor University at Buffalo

Personal details
- Born: 1964 (age 61–62) Vijayawada, India
- Citizenship: American
- Education: Indian Institute of Technology, Kharagpur; University at Buffalo, The State University of New York
- Scientific career
- Fields: Artificial Intelligence; Computer science and engineering Pattern recognition Machine learning Handwriting recognition Biometrics
- Workplaces: University at Buffalo
- Doctoral advisor: Sargur Srihari
- Doctoral students: Roman Yampolskiy

Venu Govindaraju is an Indian-American whose research interests are in the fields of artificial intelligence, handwriting recognition, document image analysis and biometrics. He presently serves as the Senior Vice President for Research, Innovation and Economic Development, serves as Chief AI Officer and is a SUNY Distinguished Professor of Computer Science and Engineering, School of Engineering and Applied Sciences at the University at Buffalo, The State University of New York, Buffalo, New York, US.

He has been recognized in Congress, the New York State Assembly, the County of Erie (New York) and Town of Amherst (New York) for being a researcher and leader.

== Research career ==
After graduating with a Ph.D. from the University at Buffalo, Govindaraju served from 1992 to 2003 as a research scientist at the Center of Excellence for Document Analysis and Recognition (CEDAR), at the University at Buffalo founded and managed by Sargur Srihari. He became associate professor in the Department of Computer Science and Engineering at the University at Buffalo in 2000, a full Professor in 2002, and a SUNY Distinguished Professor, the highest faculty rank in the State University of New York system, in 2010. Govindaraju was the founding director of the Center for Unified Biometrics and Sensors and has remained its director since its inception in 2003.

Govindaraju is principal investigator and leads the National Science Foundation-funded National AI Institute for Exceptional Education (AI4ExceptionalEd), an NSF National AI Research Institute. AI4ExceptionalEd develops models to detect language and communication challenges in children early. His groundbreaking work, previously having transformed the postal industry, now empowers speech-language pathologists and educators with tools to screen and support children with dyslexia and dysgraphia.

== Poetry ==
In 2026, Govindaraju published his first book of poetry, Discovery of Self. University at Buffalo Libraries hosted a reading and book launch on April 17, 2026. Watch a video from the event on YouTube.

== Awards and honors ==
In 2026, the Council of Heritage and Arts of India awarded Govindaraju the AAPI (Asian American and Pacific Islanders) Trailblazer Award for his "remarkable accomplishments and commitment to empowering others through leadership, service, and innovation and a legacy that paves the way for future generations."

He received Certificates of Special Recognition from the United States House of Representatives, Awards of Recognition from the New York State Senate, Citations from the New York State Assembly and Commendations from the Town of Amherst (New York) in 2024 and 2026.

Govindaraju joined the Empire AI board of directors in 2025.

In 2024, Govindaraju received the University at Buffalo President's Medal in recognition of extraordinary service to the university.

Also in 2024, he was named Person of the Year by the Council of Heritage and Arts of India for his groundbreaking contributions to AI.

Govindaraju is a member of the Pan American Academy of Engineering, a fellow of the Association for Computing Machinery, the IEEE (Institute of Electrical and Electronics Engineers), the AAAS (American Association for the Advancement of Science), the IAPR (International Association for Pattern Recognition), and the SPIE (International Society for Optics and Photonics).

He received the 2001 International Conference on Document Analysis and Recognition Young Investigator award, the 2004 MIT Global Indus Technovator Award, the 2010 IEEE Technical Achievement Award, the Indian Institutes of Technology (IIT) Distinguished Alumnus Award (2014), and the 2015 IAPR/ICDAR Outstanding Achievements Award. He was named a Fellow of the National Academy of Inventors in 2015.
