= Anil K. Jain (computer scientist, born 1948) =

Indian-American computer scientist (born 1948)

Anil Kumar Jain
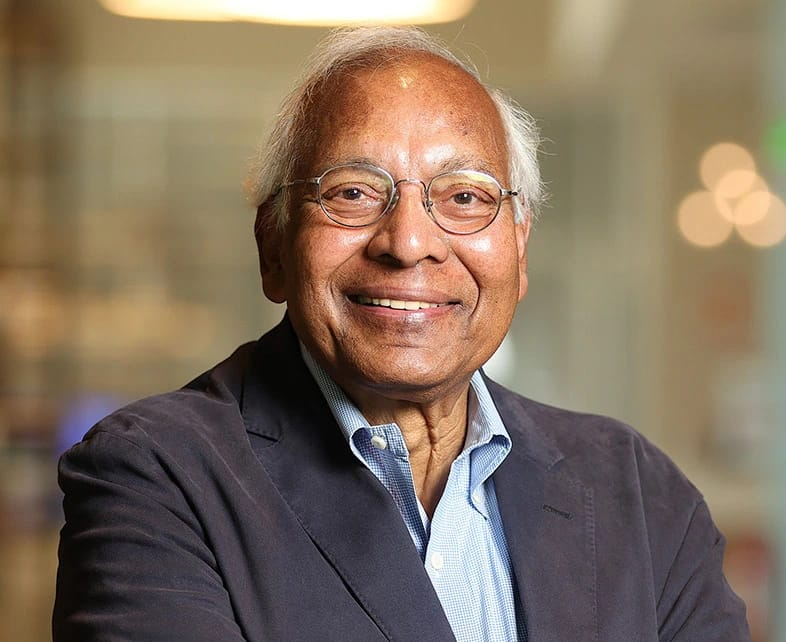
- Born: 1948 (age 77–78); Basti, India
- Known for: Biometric recognition, fingerprint recognition, face recognition, data clustering
- Awards: BBVA Foundation Frontiers of Knowledge Award (2024); Distinguished Alumni Award, IIT Kanpur (2017); Member, National Academy of Engineering (2016); Foreign Fellow, Indian National Academy of Engineering (2016); IAPR King-Sun Fu Prize (2008); IEEE W. Wallace McDowell Award (2007); IEEE Computer Society Technical Achievement Award (2003); IAPR Pierre Devijver Award (2002); Humboldt Research Award (2002); Guggenheim Fellowship (2001); Fulbright Fellowship (1998)

Academic background
- Education: Indian Institute of Technology, Kanpur; Ohio State University
- Thesis: Some Aspects of Dimensionality and Sample Size Problems in Statistical Pattern Recognition (1973)
- Doctoral advisor: Robert B. McGhee

Academic work
- Discipline: Pattern recognition, computer vision, biometrics
- Institutions: Michigan State University; Wayne State University
- Notable students: Brendan Klare, Jianchang C Mao and Arun Ross

Anil Kumar Jain (born 1948) is an Indian-American computer scientist and University Distinguished Professor and the Douglas E. Zongker Endowed Professor in the Department of Computer Science and Engineering at Michigan State University. He is one of the most highly cited researchers in computer science, and is internationally recognized for his foundational contributions to pattern recognition, computer vision, and biometric recognition, particularly in fingerprint recognition and face recognition.

Jain is a member of the United States National Academy of Engineering, a Foreign Member of the Chinese Academy of Sciences, and a Foreign Fellow of the Indian National Academy of Engineering. He is a Fellow of the ACM, IEEE, AAAS, IAPR, and SPIE. His research has shaped the field of biometrics and has been applied in systems used worldwide for identity verification, law enforcement, and border security. In 2024, he was awarded the BBVA Foundation Frontiers of Knowledge Award in the category of Information and Communication Technologies.

== Early life and education ==
Born in Basti, India, Jain received his Bachelor of Technology in electrical engineering from the Indian Institute of Technology, Kanpur in 1969. He then moved to the United States, where he earned his M.S. in 1970 and Ph.D. in 1973 from Ohio State University. His doctoral dissertation, titled Some Aspects of Dimensionality and Sample Size Problems in Statistical Pattern Recognition, was supervised by Robert B. McGhee and B. Chandrasekaran and laid the groundwork for his subsequent research in pattern recognition.

Jain began his academic career at Wayne State University, where he taught from 1972 to 1974. In 1974, he joined the faculty of Michigan State University, where he has remained for over five decades and currently holds the position of University Distinguished Professor.

Throughout his career, Jain has conducted pioneering research in data clustering, fingerprint recognition, and face recognition. His work has been published in leading scientific journals including Scientific American, Nature, IEEE Spectrum, and MIT Technology Review. He served as Editor-in-Chief of the IEEE Transactions on Pattern Analysis and Machine Intelligence from 1991 to 1994.

=== Visiting and international appointments ===
In addition to his primary appointment at Michigan State University, Jain has held visiting professorships at several institutions internationally, including Mohamed bin Zayed University of Artificial Intelligence (MBZUAI), Tsinghua University, Korea University, the Indian Institute of Information Technology, Hyderabad (IIIT-Hyderabad), Hong Kong Polytechnic University, ETH Zurich, the University of Bonn, the Technical University of Lisbon, and the University of Oslo.

Jain served on the Board of Trustees of MBZUAI from its inception in 2019 until 2024.

=== National security and policy service ===
Jain has also contributed to national security and policy through his service on several advisory bodies. He served as a member of the U.S. National Academies panels on Face Recognition Technology, Information Technology Laboratory Assessment, Whither Biometrics, and Improvised Explosive Devices (IED). He was appointed to serve on the United States Defense Science Board, the Forensic Science Standards Board, and the AAAS Latent Fingerprint Working Group. Jain served as Program Director for the Intelligent Systems at the National Science Foundation (1980–1981).

In 2014, Jain was named Innovator of the Year at Michigan State University for transferring several technologies on face and fingerprint recognition, tattoo recognition, and artificial image generation to major players in the biometrics industry. He holds 8 patents related to biometric technologies.

== Research contributions ==
Jain's research spans pattern recognition, computer vision, machine learning, and biometric recognition. Jain's pattern recognition insights have helped develop biometric recognition as a science, provided new directions to researchers and solutions to government and industry. His scientific contributions have transformed the biometric industry

=== Biometric recognition ===
Jain introduced much-needed formalism into fingerprint recognition and devised models to address the following longstanding questions:

(a) are fingerprints unique? (Pankanti, Prabhakar and Jain, IEEE PAMI, 2002), (b) does the fingerprint recognition accuracy degrade with time? (Yoon and Jain, PNAS, 2015), (c) do identical twins have the same fingerprint pattern? (Jain, Prabhakar and Pankanti, Pattern Recognition, 2002), and (d) is a given fingerprint "normal" or "abnormal" (altered)? (Yoon, Feng and Jain, IEEE PAMI, 2012).

Traditional fingerprint matching involves computationally expensive point matching, which slows down large scale database searches. To circumvent this bottleneck, his team developed DeepPrint, a deep learning-based fingerprint recognition system (Engelsma, Cao, and Jain, IEEE PAMI, 2019), which learns to extract fixed-length fingerprint representations of only 200 bytes. DeepPrint incorporates fingerprint domain knowledge, including alignment and minutiae detection, into the deep network architecture to maximise the discriminative power of its representation.

In recent years, Jain and his research team have made significant advances in child (infants and toddlers) fingerprint recognition. Infant ID (Engelsma et al., IEEE PAMI 2021) is able to correctly recognise a child's fingerprint one year later with over 99 percent accuracy for children as young as six months old. The custom low cost, compact, and high resolution fingerprint reader which his team designed for children was made available in open source. This research has important implications for child identification in developing countries, where it can be used to track immunisation records and provide access to health care.

=== Data clustering ===
The "User's Dilemma" in data clustering, a concept formalised by Dubes and Jain (1976), highlights the fundamental challenges of unsupervised learning. Because clusters are vaguely defined, practitioners face major decision points regarding feature representation, similarity metrics, and algorithm selection to successfully uncover data patterns. Later, they introduced the notions of "Clustering tendency" and "Cluster validity".

In their foundational paper, "Bootstrap Technique in Cluster Analysis," Jain and Moreau (1987) introduced a resampling method with replacement to determine the optimal number of clusters in a dataset and to measure the stability of clustering results. The approach evaluates how robust a specific K-cluster solution is by observing fluctuations across multiple resampled datasets.

Jain extended his interest in clustering and statistical models to unsupervised segmentation based on texture analysis using Markov random field models (Cross and Jain, 1984) and Gabor filter banks (Jain and Farrokhnia, 1991).

Jain's survey articles "Data clustering: a review" (1999) and "Data Clustering: 50 Years Beyond K-Means" (2010) are considered the most comprehensive and lucid overviews of the evolution of clustering methods and remain essential references in the field.

=== Citation metrics ===
Jain is among the most highly cited researchers in computer science. Based on his Google Scholar profile, he has an h-index of 223 with total citations of 290,000.

== Honors and awards ==
- Member, United States National Academy of Engineering (2016) — elected "for contributions to the engineering and practice of biometrics"
- Foreign Fellow, Indian National Academy of Engineering (2016)
- Foreign Member, Chinese Academy of Sciences (2019)
- Member, The World Academy of Sciences (2019)
- Fellow, National Academy of Inventors (2015)
- BBVA Foundation Frontiers of Knowledge Award in Information and Communication Technologies (2025)
- Doctor Honoris Causa, Universidad Autónoma de Madrid (2017)
- Doctor Honoris Causa, Hong Kong University of Science and Technology (2020)
- Doctor Honoris Causa, Hong Kong Baptist University (2021)
- Distinguished Alumni Award, IIT Kanpur (2017)
- Distinguished Alumni Award, Ohio State University (1997)
- IAPR King-Sun Fu Prize (2008)
- IEEE W. Wallace McDowell Award (2007) the highest technical honour awarded by the IEEE Computer Society, for pioneering contributions to theory, technique, and practice of pattern recognition, computer vision, and biometric recognition systems
- IEEE Computer Society Technical Achievement Award (2003)
- IAPR Pierre Devijver Award (2002)
- Humboldt Research Award (2002)
- Guggenheim Fellowship (2001)
- Fulbright Fellowship (1998)
- IEEE ICDM Research Contribution Award (2008)
- IEEE Transactions on Neural Networks Best Paper Award (1996)
- Pattern Recognition journal Best Paper Awards (1987, 1991, 2005)

== Legacy and endowments ==
Two endowed funds have been established in Jain's honor at Michigan State University, recognizing his lasting impact on the field and the university.

In 2015, a former visiting scholar from Jain's laboratory made an anonymous $400,000 gift to create the Anil K. Jain Endowed Graduate Fellowship, which supports doctoral level research in pattern recognition, computer vision, and biometric recognition.

In 2022, the Anil K. and Nandita K. Jain Endowed Professorship was established through $1 million in contributions from multiple donors, including a substantial gift from the Jain family, to support faculty recruitment and retention in the Department of Computer Science and Engineering.

In 2025, Jain was named the inaugural holder of the Douglas E. Zongker Endowed Professorship in the Department of Computer Science and Engineering, established through a $1 million gift from Douglas Zongker, a former MSU undergraduate student and research assistant in Jain's laboratory who later worked at Google (now at Waymo) on Gmail and Android.

== Selected publications ==
=== Books ===
- 1988. Algorithms For Clustering Data. With Richard C. Dubes. Prentice Hall.
- 1993. Markov Random Fields: Theory and Applications. With Rama Chellappa eds. Academic Press.
- 1999. Biometrics: Personal Identification in Networked Society. With Ruud M. Bolle and Sharath Pankanti eds. Springer.
- 2003. Handbook of Fingerprint Recognition. (2nd edition 2009). With D. Maio, D. Maltoni, S. Prabhakar. Springer.
- 2005. Handbook of Face Recognition. (2nd edition 2011). With S. Z. Li ed. Springer.
- 2006. Handbook of Multibiometrics. With A. Ross and K. Nandakumar. Springer.
- 2007. Handbook of Biometrics. With P. Flynn and A. Ross eds. Springer.
- 2011. Introduction to Biometrics. With A. Ross and K. Nandakumar. Springer.
- 2015. Encyclopedia of Biometrics (Second Edition). With Stan Li. Springer.

=== Research articles ===
- Cross, George R. and Anil K. Jain. "Markov random field texture models". IEEE Transactions on Pattern Analysis and Machine Intelligence (1983): 25–39.
- Jain, Anil K., and Farshid Farrokhnia. "Unsupervised texture segmentation using Gabor filters". Pattern Recognition 24.12 (1991): 1167–1186.
- Jain, Anil K., and Douglas Zongker. "Feature selection: Evaluation, application, and small sample performance". IEEE Transactions on Pattern Analysis and Machine Intelligence, 19.2 (1997): 153–158.
- Jain, Anil K., L. Hong, S. Pankanti, R. Bolle. "An Identity-Authentication System using Fingerprints". Proceedings of the IEEE, 85.9 (1997): 1365–1388.
- Hsu, Rein-Lien, Mohamed Abdel-Mottaleb, and Anil K. Jain. "Face detection in color images". IEEE Transactions on Pattern Analysis and Machine Intelligence, 24.5 (2002): 696–706.
- Figueiredo, Mario A.T. and Anil K. Jain. "Unsupervised learning of finite mixture models". IEEE Transactions on Pattern Analysis and Machine Intelligence, 24.3 (2002): 381–396.

=== Survey articles ===
- A. K. Jain, J. Mao, and M. Mohiuddin. "Artificial Neural Networks: A Tutorial ". IEEE Computer, Vol. 29.3 (1996), 31–44.
- Jain, Anil K., M. Narasimha Murty, and Patrick J. Flynn. "Data clustering: a review ". ACM Computing Surveys (CSUR) 31.3 (1999): 264–323.
- Jain, Anil K., Robert P. W. Duin, and Jianchang Mao. "Statistical pattern recognition: A review". IEEE Transactions on Pattern Analysis and Machine Intelligence, 22.1 (2000): 4–37.
- Jain, Anil K., Arun Ross, and Salil Prabhakar. "An Introduction to Biometric Recognition". IEEE Transactions on Circuits and Systems for Video Technology, 14.1 (2004): 4–20.
- Jain, Anil K. "Biometric Recognition: Q & A". Nature, Vol. 449, pp. 38–40, Sept. 2007.
- Jain, Anil K. "Data Clustering: 50 Years Beyond K-Means". Pattern Recognition Letters, Vol. 31, No. 8, pp. 651–666, June 2010.
