= Sargur Srihari =

Indian academic (1949–2022)

Sargur Narasimhamurthy Srihari
- Sargur N. Srihari
- Born: 7 May 1949; Bangalore, India
- Died: 8 March 2022 (aged 72); Washington, D.C.
- Education: Bangalore University; Indian Institute of Science, Bangalore; Ohio State University, Columbus
- Known for: Pattern Recognition, Machine Learning, Handwriting Recognition, Computational forensics
- Awards: IEEE Fellow; IAPR Fellow; IETE Fellow
- Scientific career
- Fields: Computer Science and Engineering; Pattern Recognition; Machine Learning
- Thesis: Comparative evaluation of stored-pattern classifiers for radar aircraft identification (1976)
- Doctoral advisor: Lee J. White
- Doctoral students: Robin Li (masters)

Sargur Narasimhamurthy Srihari (7 May 1949 – 8 March 2022) was an Indian and American computer scientist and educator who made contributions to the field of pattern recognition. The principal impact of his work has been in handwritten address reading systems and in computer forensics. He was a SUNY Distinguished Professor in the School of Engineering and Applied Sciences at the University at Buffalo, Buffalo, New York, USA.

== Early life and education ==
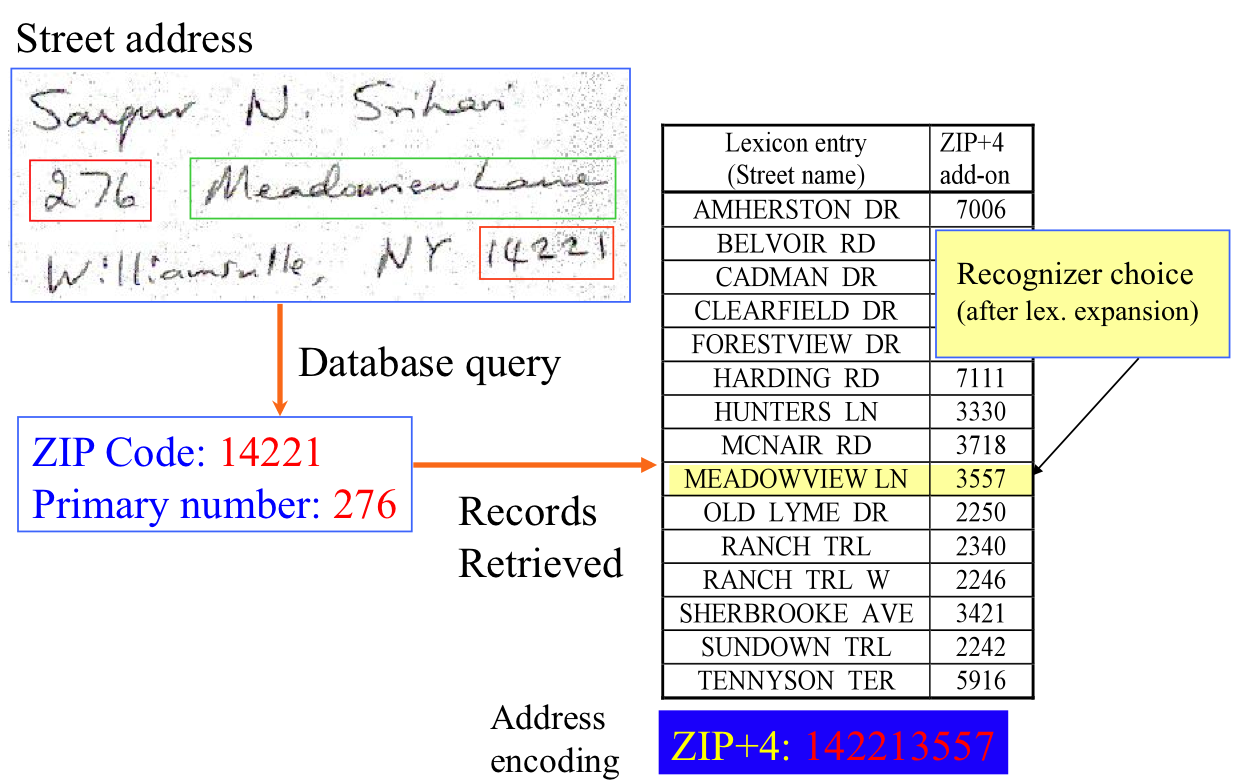
Method used for exploiting contextual information in the first handwritten address interpretation system developed by Sargur Srihari and Jonathan Hull

Srihari received undergraduate degrees in Science and in Electrical Communication Engineering from the National College of Bangalore University and the Indian Institute of Science in Bangalore respectively. He received Master's and Doctoral degrees in Computer and Information Science from Ohio State University, Columbus.

== Career ==
=== CEDAR ===
Srihari is the founding director of Center of Excellence for Document Analysis and Recognition (CEDAR) which was established with support from the United States Postal Service. Work at CEDAR led to the first handwritten address interpretation system in the world, versions of which were deployed by the Internal Revenue Service, USPS, Australia Post and UK Royal Mail. His subsequent work led to the first handwriting verification and identification system known as CEDAR-FOX, which was granted a U.S. Patent in 2009.

Srihari had a leading role in establishing the international conferences on document analysis and recognition, frontiers of handwriting recognition and computational forensics. He also served on the Board of Scientific Counselors of the National Library of Medicine for six years.

=== Computational forensics ===
In 2002, Srihari published a landmark study establishing the individuality of handwriting. This work was cited in Daubert standard and Frye standard hearings in United States courts leading to the admission of handwriting evidence in those cases. This research work was later extended to shoe-print and fingerprint recognition as well. Srihari served on the National Academy of Sciences Committee on Identifying the needs of the Forensic Science Community which led to a highly influential report entitled "Strengthening Forensic Science in the United States: A Path Forward" published in April 2009.

== Personal life ==
Srihari died from complications of glioblastoma on 8 March 2022, at the age of 72.

== Awards ==
Srihari became an IEEE Fellow in 1995 and an IAPR Fellow in 1996. He was the recipient of the Outstanding Achievements Award of IAPR/ICDAR for 2011.
