= Aly Farag =

Engineer

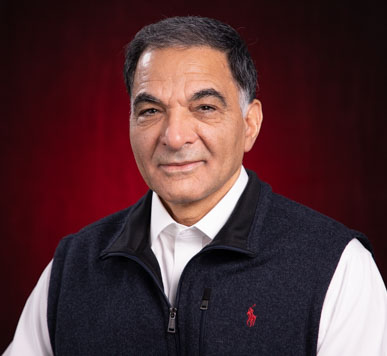

Aly Farag is an Electrical and Biomedical Engineer. As of 2022, he is a professor at the University of Louisville. He was named Fellow of the Institute of Electrical and Electronics Engineers (IEEE) in 2014 for contributions to image modeling and biomedical applications.

== Education ==
Farag studied Electrical Engineering at Cairo University, earning a B.S. degree in 1976. He continued his studies at Cairo University, earning a diploma in Systems and Biomedical Engineering in 1979. He then earned master's degrees in Biomedical Engineering in 1981 from Ohio State University and Bioengineering in 1984 from University of Michigan before completing his education with a Ph.D. in Electrical Engineering from Purdue University in 1990.

== Awards and recognition ==
Farag has been Elected Fellow of IEEE and IAPR for contributions to Image Modeling and Biomedical Applications. Since January 2019, he has been elevated to the rank of Life IEEE Fellow.

== Research ==
=== Selected publications ===
- Mohamed, Mostafa; Ali, Asem; Elshazly, Salwa; Farag, Aly (2021). "Stabilising visualisation by reducing camera movements in virtual colonoscopy methods". Computer Methods in Biomechanics and Biomedical Engineering: Imaging & Visualization. 9 (3): 253–260. doi:10.1080/21681163.2020.1835557. S2CID 229470420.
- Farag, Amal; Ali, Asem; Elshazly, Salwa; Farag, Aly A. (16 June 2017). "Feature fusion for lung nodule classification". International Journal of Computer Assisted Radiology and Surgery. 12 (10): 1809–1818. doi:10.1007/s11548-017-1626-1. PMID 28623478. S2CID 12663102.
- Elhabian, S; Farag, A (2016). "Helmholtz HSH-Based Basis: A Compact Phenomenological Representation of Arbitrary Reflectance". Informatica. 26 (4): 593–620. doi:10.15388/Informatica.2015.66.
- Mostafa, Eslam; Ali, Asem; Farag, Aly (2015). "Learning a non-linear combination of Mahalanobis distances using statistical inference for similarity measure". IET Computer Vision. 9 (4): 541–548. doi:10.1049/iet-cvi.2014.0011.
- Ismail, Marwa; Elshazly, Salwa; Farag, Aly; Sites, Chuck; Curtin, Robert; Falk, Robert; Seow, Albert; Dryden, Gerald (2015). "Revamped fly-over for accurate colon visualisation in virtual colonoscopy". IET Computer Vision. 9 (4): 511–521. doi:10.1049/iet-cvi.2014.0177.
