= Guberman =

Guberman is a surname. Notable people with the surname include:

- Igor Guberman (born 1936), Russian writer and poet of Jewish ancestry
- Scott Guberman (born 1971), American keyboardist
- Shelia Guberman (born 1930), Russian-American computer scientist
- Barry Strain Guberman (born 1978), British businessman, founder of Guberman International Trading and Guberman International Recycling
