= William Webb (engineer) =

British engineer

- Born: 1967 (age 58–59); United Kingdom
- Education: University of Southampton
- Known for: technology entrepreneurship
- Awards: FREng (2005); IET Mountbatten Medal (2018)
- Scientific career
- Fields: Telecommunications engineering
- Workplaces: University of Southampton; Ofcom
- Thesis: “QAM for Digital Mobile Radio (1992)

William Webb is a British telecommunications engineer who is a visiting professor at the University of Southampton. He was IET President 2014) and is a Director of Webb Search Ltd., UK.

== Education ==
Webb was educated at University of Southampton, UK. He received his undergraduate degree in 1989 and Ph.D. degree in 1992. He received his MBA from the same university in 1997.

== Career ==
Webb started his career at Smith System Engineering Ltd. UK. He then worked for Motorola Inc. He joined PA Consulting UK to work on a number of telecommunications projects. He joined Ofcom UK as Head of R&D and worked on radio spectrum policy. He was one of the co-founders of Neul which was acquired by Huawei in 2014. Webb was President of IET UK (2014) and CEO of Weightless SIG. He is a director at Webb Search Ltd.

== Awards ==
Webb received the IET Mountbatten Medal in 2018. He was elected to the Royal Academy of Engineering in 2005. He has received three honorary doctorate degrees, from University of Southampton, Anglia Ruskin University and University of Hertfordshire.
