= MovAlyzeR =

- Developer: NeuroScript
- Stable release: 6.1 / July 27, 2010; 16 years ago
- Written in: C++
- Operating system: Microsoft Windows
- Type: Handwriting Movement Analysis
- License: Proprietary EULA
- Website: www.neuroscript.net/movalyzer.php

MovAlyzeR is a software package for handwriting movement analysis for research and professional applications. Handwriting movements are recorded using a digitizing tablet connected to a computer. MovAlyzeR is used in many different fields ranging from research in kinesiology, psychology, education, geriatrics, neurology, psychiatry, occupational therapy, forensic document examination or questioned document examination, computer science, to educational demonstrations or student projects in these fields.

== Features ==
MovAlyzeR can be customized for many different pen-movement tests, including goal-directed movements, drawing and handwriting up to a full page of text. It can also process scanned images of handwriting for use in, for example, forensic document examination. Immediately after each trial, consistency with the required pen-movement task is verified so that the user can decide to correct or redo a trial. MovAlyzeR can generate animated audiovisual stimuli which can be edited using its Stimulus Editor.

MovAlyzeRx has the same capability as MovAlyzeR except altering a test. It is designed for medical professionals (hence Rx). The user interface is as simple as possible. No left-clicks are required. The screen layout can be customized. To start testing, just type the patient or participant code.

ScriptAlyzeR handwriting analysis software, is a sub-package of MovAlyzeR excluding visual stimuli and sub-movement analysis.

GripAlyzeR is another flavor of MovAlyzeR for bi-manual force coordination using dedicated hardware: two grip-force units connected via a magnet of programmable force.

== History ==
The original code of the software was the result of many years of research in handwriting movements. At the core of the software, the signal analysis algorithms that are used have been developed since 1976 when Dr. Hans-Leo Teulings conducted research into the development of handwriting motor control in children in comparison to children with developmental disorders at the Department of Experimental Psychology at the University of Nijmegen (KUN), in The Netherlands. The department became part of the Nijmegen Institute for Cognition and Information (NICI) and eventually the Centre for Cognition at the Radboud University Nijmegen (RU).

These signal analysis algorithms were originally coded in Fortran on Digital's PDP11/34 laboratory computers with 54kB of memory. The algorithms use a complex Fast Fourier Transform (FFT) to transform both the x and y signals into frequency domain. This allows low-pass filtering and differentiation with zero-phase and ripple free filtering of both x and y signals simultaneously (Teulings & Maarse, 1984).

The software was expanded and transcribed into plain C during the European ESPRIT projects: P419 "Image and Movement Understanding -- IMU" on Cursive-script recognition (1985–1988) and ESPRIT project P5204 "Pen And Paper Input Recognition Using Script – PAPYRUS (1991–1992).

The software was developed further at the Motor Control Laboratory of Arizona State University, USA (1993–1997) for research on Parkinson's disease and aging.

In 1997, NeuroScript was founded by Dr. Hans-Leo Teulings and Prof. George Stelmach (who has since retired) as a result of a National Institutes of Health (NIH) Small Business and Innovation Research (SBIR) Phase I grant (R43 RR11683: Analysis system for fine motor control) to conduct a feasibility study into the feasibility of a general purpose handwriting movement analysis system for research.

In 1999, an SBIR Phase II grant was awarded to NeuroScript (R44 RR11683 Analysis system for fine motor control). The aim was to develop this system into a usable product. The result: the MovAlyzeR software was born - named, designed and implemented by Gregory M. Baker who joined NeuroScript in 1999.

In 2002, NeuroScript received an SBIR Phase II grant (R44 NS39212 Force measurement and analysis system). This enabled NeuroScript to generalize MovAlyzeR for bi-manual force coordination: GripAlyzeR. Instead of x and y movement components and axial pen pressure, GripAlyzeR used left and right grip forces and a lift force.

In 2002 NeuroScript received another Phase II grant (R44 NS38793: Optimization software for goal-directed movements). MovAlyzeR was expanded with interactive and animated audio-visual stimuli and sub-movement analysis.

In 2006, a Phase II grant was awarded (R44 MH073192: Movement Analysis to Monitor Medication). MovAlyzeR was tested in several major clinics where hundreds of patients were tested for movement side effects due to schizophrenia medication in addition to conventional clinical evaluation (SAEPS - Simpson-Angus Scale for Extrapyramidal Symptoms and parkinsonism, AIMS – Abnormal Involuntary Movement Scale for tardive dyskinesia, BARS – Barnes Akathisia Rating Scale). Results demonstrated that MovAlyzeR measurements were more sensitive for dosage and medication type than the conventional clinical evaluations.

== Versions ==
- MovAlyzeR 6 (Apr. 2010) External processing extended to the trial events set in each condition or task. Added Getting-Started Videos window with links to tutorial videos. Example experiments improved. Sample MATLAB® scripts for external processing added to the new sample experiment: MAT. Any PNG, JPG, BMP, GIF and PCX handwriting image processing added. New skins. The licensing interface simplified and improved.
- MovAlyzeR 5 (Feb. 2009) Integrated with Matlab scripts. Uninterrupted recordings of 30 minutes. Word extraction in recordings with large numbers of words. MovAlyzeR Quick Reference. Attachments of documents to experiments. Enhanced tutorial. MovAlyzeRx patient-centered experiment and data analysis interface (no right-clicks needed). Customizable application look.
- MovAlyzeR 4 (Feb. 2007) Certified for MS Windows Vista. Pen tilt recording. Knowledge of Results after each trial. Summarization of data across trials or up and down strokes. Sequence of condition customization with randomization rules. Sampling rate and device resolution automatically detected per test and stored for each subject. Questionnaire for demographics and clinical data integrated in data summarization. Subject Codes without limitation. Automatic generation of up to 46000 unique subject IDs. Export Wizard for multiple-subject export and automatic website (FTP) uploading. Device setup wizard. Graphical Stimulus Editor. Correction and measurement of data discontinuities due to pen lifts. Importing and processing of handwriting images.
- MovAlyzeR 3 (Aug. 2004) Digitally signed by VeriSign using Microsoft Authenticode. Pay per use. Data sharing via LAN or internet URL. Client / Server database interaction. Multiple stroke segmentation methods.
- MovAlyzeR 2 (Sep. 2002) Certified for MS Windows XP. Event sounds. Stroke counting during recording. Real-time transformation of visual feedback during recording. Dynamic and animated stimuli. Example user UU1 with example experiments. Tooltips to all screen items. Digitizer accuracy and linearity test. Test signal simulation. Subject privacy protection.
- MovAlyzeR 1 (Aug. 2001) Data import wizard. Run experiment wizard. Charts with Standard Error, Mean of the within-subject means and SDs. Replay handwriting movement in real time.

== Related file formats and extensions ==
Ext.	Explanation
.hwr	.hwr files contain x and y tablet coordinates and axial pen pressure. Data can also include azimuth and altitude angles of the pen barrel relative to the digitizer tablet.
.mef	.mef files are MovAlyzeR Export Files with a complete experiment plus raw data and privacy-protected subject data using data encryption plus password protection. Only MovAlyzeR can open these files.

== Comparable software ==
- CSWIN by Science and Motion
- OASIS by KikoSoft
- Pullman Spiral Acquisition and Analysis by Lafayette
- NeuroSkill by Verifax
- COMpet by University of Haifa
- MedDraw by Universities of Kent and Rouen

== See also ==
- Graphonomics, science of handwriting and drawing movement production and processing.
- Fine motor skill, dexterity and coordination of small muscle movements
- Handwriting movement analysis, reviewing digitizer tablets and software systems
