= Ronjon Nag =

British-American inventory and entrepreneur in the mobile technology field

Ronjon Nag OBE
- Education: University of Birmingham; Massachusetts Institute of Technology; Cambridge University
- Known for: Mobile Technology Components
- Awards: Mountbatten Medal (2014), IEEE SCV Outstanding Engineer (2021)
- Scientific career
- Fields: Mobile Technology
- Workplaces: Stanford University

Ronjon Nag OBE is a British-American inventor and entrepreneur specializing in the field of mobile technology. He co-founded the technology company Lexicus, acquired by Motorola in 1993 and Cellmania, acquired by Research in Motion in 2010. He later served as Vice-President of both Motorola and BlackBerry.

== Education and personal life ==
Ronjon Nag received his bachelor's degree in 1984 from the University of Birmingham, where he studied Electronic & Electrical Engineering. He received a Master of Science degree from MIT in Management Science and studied neural networks in Stanford University's Department of Psychology. After completing a Doctorate in Engineering at Cambridge University, he studied as a Harkness Fellow in the United States at Massachusetts Institute of Technology and Stanford University. In 2014 became a Fellow of the Institution of Engineering and Technology and in 2016, he become a fellow of the Stanford University Distinguished Careers .

He divides his time between Cambridge in the United Kingdom and Silicon Valley in California.

== Career in Technology ==
Nag's work has focused on inventing new systems for interacting with mobile devices, resulting in breakthroughs in the application of speech recognition, handwriting recognition, predictive text and touch screens for mobile devices. As a student at Cambridge University, Nag wrote an article applying a hidden Markov model to speech recognition, which became the basis for his Phd on the subject. In 1991 Ronjon Nag began researching artificial neural networks, first under Amar Gupta at MIT and then in Stanford University's Department of Psychology, studying under David Rumelhart. In 1992, Nag co-founded the technology company Lexicus in Palo Alto, California. As CEO and as a computer scientist, Nag oversaw the emergence of Lexicus as an industry pioneer of speech and predictive technology systems and saw the acquisition of Lexicus by Motorola in November 1993. As a subsidiary of Motorola, Lexicus introduced some of the first devices with Chinese handwriting and speech recognition. In 1999, he founded Cellmania, a mobile infrastructure company that provided digital rights management for mobile content, enabling the creation of some of the first mobile app stores. Cellmania was sold to Research in Motion, now BlackBerry Limited, in 2010 for an undisclosed sum.

Nag is President of the R42 Institute which develops and funds AI and Longevity projects. Nag is also Chairman of Bounce Imaging, which develops throwable cameras undertaking video stitching whilst being thrown, winning the $1m Verizon Powerful Answers Prize in 2015.

== Awards ==
In 2014 Nag was the recipient of the Mountbatten Medal awarded by the Institution of Engineering and Technology. The award cited Nag's influence on the creation of the modern mobile phone industry with the development of smartphone components such as text and speech recognition and digital distribution platforms, technologies that were later incorporated widely into early smartphones developed by Motorola and BlackBerry.

In 2021, Nag's contributions in engineering entrepreneurship, smartphone user interfaces, and mobile app stores were acknowledged by the IEEE Santa Clara Valley Section (SCV) with an Outstanding Engineer award.
