= AI-complete =

Term describing difficult problems in AI

In the field of artificial intelligence (AI), tasks that are hypothesized to require artificial general intelligence to solve are informally known as AI-complete or AI-hard. Calling a problem AI-complete reflects the belief that it cannot be solved by a simple specific algorithm.

Prior to 2013, problems supposed to be AI-complete included computer vision, natural language understanding, and dealing with unexpected circumstances while solving any real-world problem. AI-complete tasks were notably considered useful for distinguishing humans from automated agents, as CAPTCHAs aim to do.

== History ==
The term was coined by Fanya Montalvo by analogy with NP-complete and NP-hard in complexity theory, which formally describes the most famous class of difficult problems. Early uses of the term are in Erik Mueller's 1987 PhD dissertation and in Eric Raymond's 1991 Jargon File.

Expert systems, that were popular in the 1980s, were able to solve very simple and/or restricted versions of AI-complete problems, but never in their full generality. When AI researchers attempted to "scale up" their systems to handle more complicated, real-world situations, the programs tended to become excessively brittle without commonsense knowledge or a rudimentary understanding of the situation: they would fail as unexpected circumstances outside of its original problem context would begin to appear. When human beings are dealing with new situations in the world, they are helped by their awareness of the general context: they know what the things around them are, why they are there, what they are likely to do and so on. They can recognize unusual situations and adjust accordingly. Expert systems lacked this adaptability and were brittle when facing new situations.

DeepMind published a work in May 2022 in which they trained a single model to do several things at the same time. The model, named Gato, can "play Atari, caption images, chat, stack blocks with a real robot arm and much more, deciding based on its context whether to output text, joint torques, button presses, or other tokens." Similarly, some tasks once considered to be AI-complete, like machine translation, are among the capabilities of large language models.

== AI-complete problems ==
AI-complete problems have been hypothesized to include:

- AI peer review (composite natural language understanding, automated reasoning, automated theorem proving, formalized logic expert system)
- Bongard problems
- Computer vision (and subproblems such as object recognition)
- Natural language understanding (and subproblems such as text mining, machine translation, and word-sense disambiguation)
- Autonomous driving
- Dealing with unexpected circumstances while solving any real world problem, whether navigation, planning, or the kind of reasoning done by expert systems.

== Formalization ==
Computational complexity theory deals with the relative computational difficulty of computable functions. By definition, it does not cover problems whose solution is unknown or has not been characterized formally. Since many AI problems have no formalization yet, conventional complexity theory does not enable a formal definition of AI-completeness.

== Research ==
Roman Yampolskiy suggests that a problem $C$ is AI-Complete if it has two properties:

- It is in the set of AI problems (Human Oracle-solvable).
- Any AI problem can be converted into $C$ by some polynomial time algorithm.

On the other hand, a problem $H$ is AI-Hard if and only if there is an AI-Complete problem $C$ that is polynomial time Turing-reducible to $H$. This also gives as a consequence the existence of AI-Easy problems, that are solvable in polynomial time by a deterministic Turing machine with an oracle for some problem.

Yampolskiy has also hypothesized that the Turing Test is a defining feature of AI-completeness.

Groppe and Jain classify problems which require artificial general intelligence to reach human-level machine performance as AI-complete, while only restricted versions of AI-complete problems can be solved by the current AI systems. For Šekrst, getting a polynomial solution to AI-complete problems would not necessarily be equal to solving the issue of artificial general intelligence, while emphasizing the lack of computational complexity research being the limiting factor towards achieving artificial general intelligence.

For Kwee-Bintoro and Velez, solving AI-complete problems would have strong repercussions on society.

== See also ==
- ASR-complete
- List of unsolved problems in computer science
- Synthetic intelligence
