= Jianchang Mao =

Jianchang (JC) Mao
- Born: November 1963 (age 62); China
- Citizenship: United States
- Education: Michigan State University, East China Normal University
- Awards: IEEE Fellow, Microsoft Distinguished Engineer, Distinguished Alumni Awards, IEEE Paper Award, Yahoo! Leadership Superstar Award, etc.
- Scientific career
- Fields: Pattern Recognition, Machine Learning, AI, Online Advertising
- Workplaces: Microsoft, Yahoo!, Verity Inc., IBM

Jianchang (JC) Mao (born in November 1963) is a Chinese-American computer scientist and Vice President, Google Assistant Engineering at Google. His research spans artificial intelligence, machine learning, computational advertising, data mining, and information retrieval. He was named a Fellow of the Institute of Electrical and Electronics Engineers (IEEE) in 2012 for his contributions to pattern recognition, search, content analysis, and computational advertising.

== Early life and education ==
Mao grew up in Zhejiang, China. He got his bachelor's degree in Physics and master's degree in Electronics from East China Normal University, Shanghai, China. He studied artificial neural networks, pattern recognition and machine learning at Michigan State University under the supervision of University Distinguished Professor Anil K. Jain and earned a Ph.D. in Computer Science in 1994.

== Career ==
Mao began his career in the US at the IBM Almaden Research Center, California, in 1994. He was a research staff member there till 2000 when he joined Verity Inc., a leader in Enterprise Search (acquired by Autonomy and then by Hewlett-Packard). From 2000 to 2004, Mao was a principal architect and director of emerging technologies at Verity. From 2004 to 2012, Mao served various leadership positions at Yahoo!. Mao was vice president and head of advertising sciences at Yahoo! Labs, overseeing the R&D of advertising technologies and products including search advertising, contextual advertising, display advertising, targeting, and categorization. In his early years at Yahoo!, Mao was the science and engineering director responsible for the development of back-end technologies for several Yahoo! social search products, including MyWeb and Yahoo! Answers. Mao joined Microsoft in 2012. He served as Corporate Vice President, Microsoft Advertising Products and Engineering. His organization was responsible for building advertising platforms, technologies, and products, and running a multi-billion-dollar advertising marketplace that serves both search ads and native ads on search and content publishers including Bing, Verizon Media, Microsoft News, and Outlook in the US and international markets. He is currently Vice President, Google Assistant Engineering at Google.

== Research and awards ==
Mao has published more than 50 papers in journals, book chapters, and conferences, and holds 30+ U.S. patents. Mao received an Honorable Mention Award in Association for Computing Machinery KDD Cup 2002 (Task 1: Information Extraction from Biomedical Articles), an IEEE Transactions on Neural Networks Outstanding Paper Award in 1996 (for his 1995 paper), and an Honorable Mention Award from the International Pattern Recognition Journal in 1993. He served as an associate editor (1999-2000) and guest co-editor (Vol. 8, No.1. Jan 1997) of the IEEE Transactions on Neural Networks. Mao received the Claud R. Erickson Distinguished Alumni Award from the College of Engineering, the highest honor presented to an alumnus by the college at Michigan State University. Mao was the commencement speaker for the class of 2018 Spring in the College of Engineering at Michigan State University.

== Selected publications ==
- A.K. Jain, R.P.W. Duin, and Jianchang Mao. "Statistical pattern recognition: A review". IEEE Transactions on Pattern Analysis and Machine Intelligence, 22.1 (2000): 4-37.
- A.K. Jain, J. Mao, and M. Mohiuddin. "Artificial Neural Networks: A Tutorial ", IEEE Computer, Vol. 29.3 (1996), 31–44.
- J. Mao and A.K. Jain. Artificial neural networks for feature extraction and multivariate data projection. IEEE Trans. Neural Networks, Vol.6, No.2. pp. 296–317. March 1995. Received the Outstanding Paper Award.
- J. Mao and A.K. Jain. Texture classification and segmentation using multi-resolution simultaneous autoregressive models. Pattern Recognition, 25(2): 173–188, 1992. Received an Honorable Mention Award.
- R. Mukherjee and J. Mao. Enterprise Search: Tough Stuff. ACM Queue. Vol.2 No.2. pp. 37–46. April 2004.
- M.A. Kraaijveld, J. Mao, and A.K. Jain. A nonlinear projection method based on Kohonen’s topology preserving maps. IEEE Trans. Neural Networks, Vol.6, No.3. pp. 548–559. May 1995.
- H. Valizadegan, R. Jin, R. Zhang, J. Mao. Learning to Rank by Optimizing NDCG Measure. The Twenty-Third Annual Conference on Neural Information Processing Systems (NIPS 2009), Vancouver, Canada, December, 2009.
- Z. Xu, Y. Fu, J. Mao, D. Su. Towards the Semantic Web: Collaborative Tag Suggestions. The 14th International World Wide Web conference (WWW 2006). Edinburgh. May 22, 2006.
- J. Zhu, Y. Shan, J. Mao, D. Yu, H. Rahmanian, and Y. Zhang. Deep embedding forest: Forest-based serving with deep embedding features. In Proceedings of the 23rd ACM SIGKDD International Conference on Knowledge Discovery and Data Mining (KDD 2017). Halifax, Canada. August 13–17, 2017.
- Y. Shan, T.R. Hoens, J. Jiao, H. Wang, D. Yu, and J. Mao. Deep Crossing: Web-Scale Modeling without Manually Crafted Combinatorial Features. The 22nd ACM SIGKDD Conference on Knowledge Discovery and Data Mining (KDD 2016). San Francisco, California, USA. August 13–17, 2016.

See the complete list of papers and patents at his Google Scholar page.
