= Jean Armstrong =

Australian design engineer

- Born: Scotland
- Education: University of Edinburgh, Scotland; Heriot-Watt University in Edinburgh, Scotland
- Occupation: Design engineer
- Known for: Fellow of the Institute of Electrical and Electronics Engineers

Jean Armstrong is an engineering professor at Monash University in Melbourne, Australia, was named Fellow of the Institute of Electrical and Electronics Engineers (IEEE) in 2015 for "contributions to the theory and application of orthogonal frequency division multiplexing in wireless and optical communications". She was inducted to the Victorian Honour Roll of Women in 2008.

== Biography ==
Armstrong was born in Scotland and later immigrated to Australia. She received a B.Sc. in electrical engineering from the University of Edinburgh, Scotland in 1974, an M.Sc. in digital techniques from the Heriot-Watt University in Edinburgh, Scotland in 1980, and a Ph.D. in digital communications from Monash University in Melbourne, Australia in 1993. She has published many papers on wireless and optical communications, focusing specifically on Orthogonal frequency-division multiplexing. Her work has led to a number of commercialized patents.

Between 1974 and 1977, she worked as a design engineer at Hewlett-Packard Ltd., Scotland. Since 1977, she has been working in academia, holding positions at the University of Melbourne, Monash University, and La Trobe University.

In 2016 she was awarded the Institution of Engineering and Technology Mountbatten Medal.
