= ASR-complete =

Type of task difficulty

ASR-complete is, by analogy to "NP-completeness" in complexity theory, a term to indicate that the difficulty of a computational problem is equivalent to solving the central automatic speech recognition problem, i.e. recognize and understanding spoken language. Unlike "NP-completeness", this term is typically used informally.

Such problems are hypothesised to include:

- Spoken natural language understanding
- Understanding speech from far-field microphones, i.e. handling the reverbation and background noise

These problems are easy for humans to do (in fact, they are described directly in terms of imitating humans). Some systems can solve very simple restricted versions of these problems, but none can solve them in their full generality.

== See also ==
- AI-complete
