= Roman Yampolskiy =

Latvian-American AI researcher (born 1979)

- Роман Ямпольский
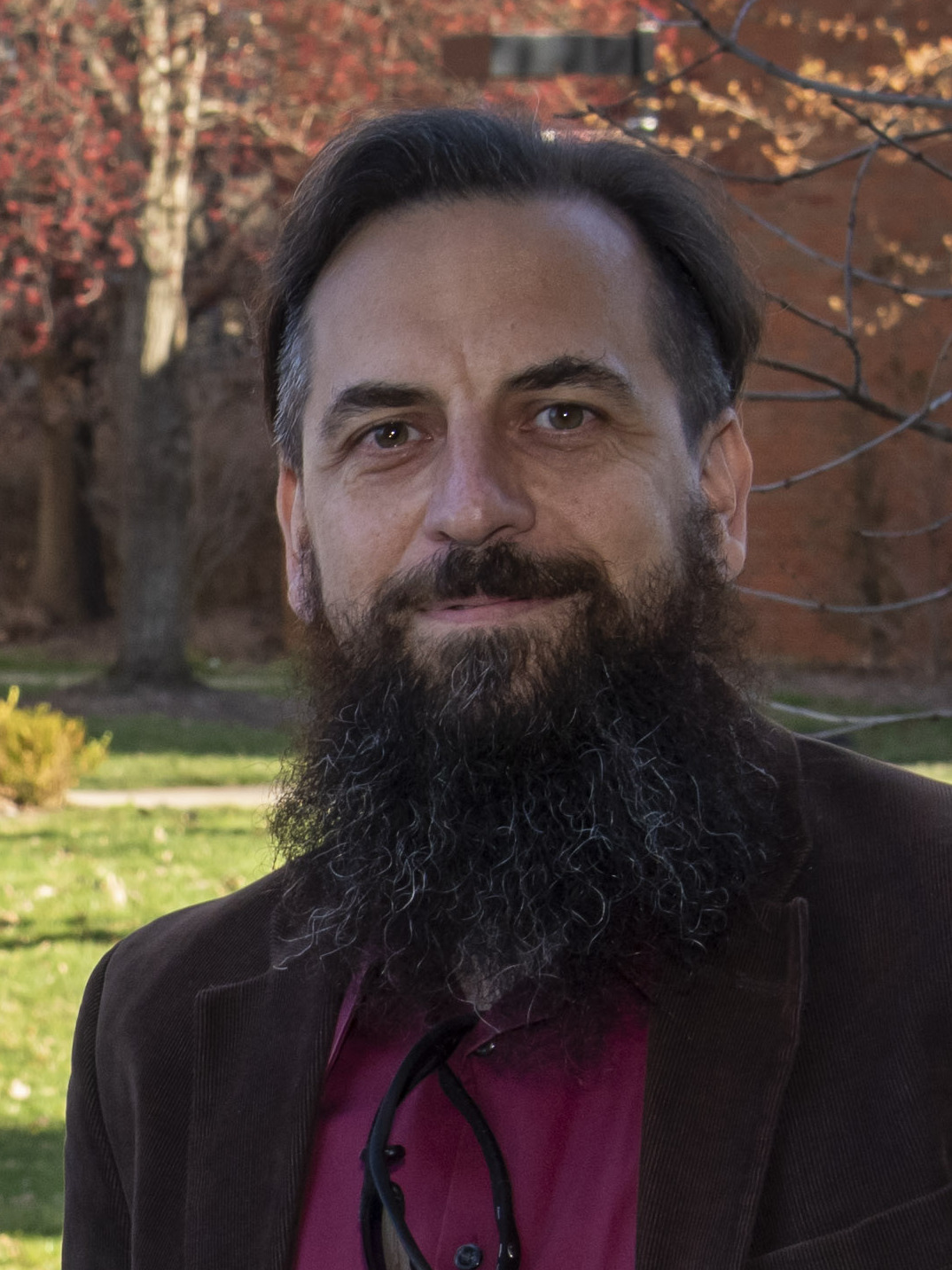
- Yampolskiy in 2023
- Born: Roman Vladimirovich Yampolskiy; August 13, 1979 (age 47); Riga, Latvian SSR, Soviet Union
- Education: Rochester Institute of Technology; University at Buffalo
- Scientific career
- Fields: Computer science
- Workplaces: University of Louisville; Speed School of Engineering
- Thesis: Intrusion detection using spatial information and behavioral biometrics (2008)
- Doctoral advisor: Venu Govindaraju
- Website: www.romanyampolskiy.com

Roman Vladimirovich Yampolskiy (Russian: Роман Владимирович Ямпольский; born 13 August, 1979) is a computer scientist at the University of Louisville, mostly known for his work on AI safety and cybersecurity. He founded the Cybersecurity Lab in the department of Computer Engineering and Computer Science at the Speed School of Engineering of the University of Louisville.

He opposes the development of artificial superintelligence, arguing that it cannot be controlled. He said in 2024 that he believed AI to be 99.9% likely to eliminate humanity within a century.

== Early life and education ==
Yampolskiy was born in Riga, Latvia. He attended Monroe Community College before moving to Rochester Institute of Technology, where he received a combined B.S. and M.S. degree in computer science in 2004. He received a Ph.D. in computer science from the University at Buffalo in 2008, under the supervision of Venu Govindaraju. His thesis was on intrusion detection and he conducted research at the Center for Unified Biometrics and Sensors of the University at Buffalo. After his doctorate, Yampolskiy spent time at the Centre for Advanced Spatial Analysis at University College London before accepting a position as an assistant professor at the University of Louisville in 2008.

== Career ==
Yampolskiy founded the Cybersecurity Lab in the department of Computer Engineering and Computer Science at the Speed School of Engineering of the University of Louisville in 2008 and directed it for a number of years.

=== AI safety ===
Yampolskiy is considered to have coined the term "AI safety" in a 2011 publication, and is an early researcher in the field.

Yampolskiy has warned of the possibility of existential risk from advanced artificial intelligence, and has advocated research into "boxing" artificial intelligence. More broadly, Yampolskiy and his collaborator, Michaël Trazzi, have proposed in 2018 to introduce "Achilles' heels" into potentially dangerous AI, for example by barring an AI from accessing and modifying its own source code. Another proposal is to apply a "security mindset" to AI safety, itemizing potential outcomes in order to better evaluate proposed safety mechanisms.

He has said that there is no evidence of a solution to the AI control problem and has proposed pausing AI development, arguing that "Imagining humans can control superintelligent AI is a little like imagining that an ant can control the outcome of an NFL football game being played around it". He joined AI researchers such as Yoshua Bengio and Stuart Russell in signing "Pause Giant AI Experiments: An Open Letter" in March 2023.

In an appearance on the Lex Fridman podcast in 2024, Yampolskiy said the chance that AI could lead to human extinction was at "99.9% within the next hundred years". In 2025, Yampolskiy said that AI could leave 99% of workers unemployed by 2030.

Yampolskiy has been a research advisor of the Machine Intelligence Research Institute, and an AI safety fellow of the Foresight Institute.

In 2015, Yampolskiy proposed the term "intellectology" for a new field of study to analyze the forms and limits of intelligence. Yampolskiy considers AI to be a sub-field of this.

Yampolskiy has worked on developing the theory of AI-completeness, suggesting the Turing Test as a defining example.

== Books ==
- Feature Extraction Approaches for Optical Character Recognition. Briviba Scientific Press, 2007, ISBN 0-6151-5511-1
- Computer Security: from Passwords to Behavioral Biometrics. New Academic Publishing, 2008, ISBN 0-6152-1818-0
- Game Strategy: a Novel Behavioral Biometric. Independent University Press, 2009, ISBN 0-578-03685-1
- Yampolskiy, Roman V. (2016). Artificial superintelligence: a futuristic approach. Boca Raton: Taylor & Francis, CRC Press. ISBN 978-1-4822-3443-5.
- Yampolskiy, Roman V., ed. (2019). Artificial intelligence safety and security. Chapman & Hall/CRC artificial intelligence and robotics series. Boca Raton: CRC Press/Taylor & Francis Group. ISBN 978-0-8153-6982-0.
- Yampolskiy, Roman V. (2024). AI: unexplainable, unpredictable, uncontrollable. Chapman & Hall/CRC artificial intelligence and robotics series. Boca Raton: CRC Press Taylor & Francis Group. ISBN 978-1-003-44026-0.
- Ziesche, Soenke; Yampolskiy, Roman V. (2025). Considerations on the AI endgame: ethics, risks, and computational frameworks. Chapman and Hall/CRC Press. ISBN 978-1-040-31862-1.

== See also ==
- AI capability control
- AI-complete
- Machine Intelligence Research Institute
- Singularity University
