= IET Mountbatten Medal =

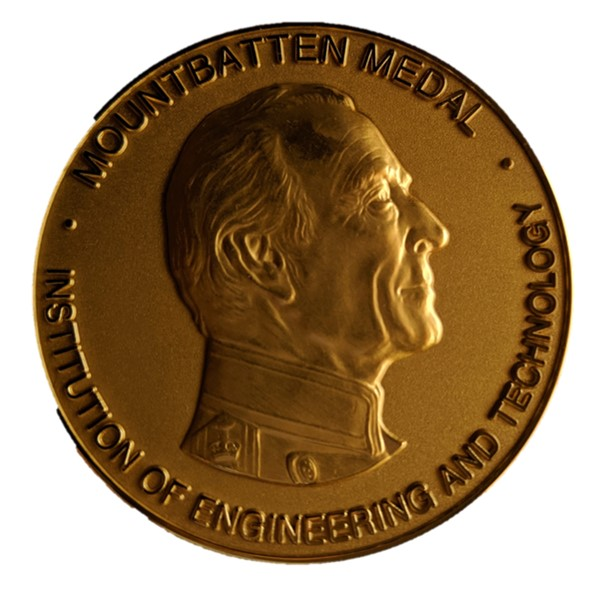
- Awarded for: Awarded for an outstanding contribution, or contributions over a period, to the promotion of electronics or information technology and their application.
- Sponsored by: Institution of Engineering and Technology and the Institution of Electrical Engineers
- Date: Since 1992
- Country: United Kingdom

Precedence
- Next (higher): Faraday Medal
- Next (lower): Mensforth Manufacturing Gold Medal

The IET Mountbatten Medal is awarded annually for an outstanding contribution, or contributions over a period, to the promotion of electronics or information technology and their application. The Medal was established by the National Electronics Council in 1992 and named after Louis Mountbatten, The Earl Mountbatten of Burma, Admiral of the Fleet and Governor-General of India. Since 2011, the medal has been awarded as one of the IET Achievement Medals.

== Eligibility ==
One of the IET's Prestige Achievement Medals, the Medal is awarded to an individual for an outstanding contribution, or contributions over a period, to the promotion of electronics or information technology and in the dissemination of the understanding of electronics and information technology to young people, or adults.

== Criteria ==
In selecting a winner, the Panel give particular emphasis to:

- the stimulation of public awareness of the significance and value of electronics;
- spreading recognition of the economic significance of electronics and IT, and encouraging their effective use throughout industry in general;
- encouraging excellence in product innovation and the successful transition of scientific advances to wealth-creating products;
- recognising brilliance in academic and industrial research;
- encouraging young people of both sexes to make their careers in the electronics and IT industries;
- increasing the awareness of the importance of electronics and IT amongst teachers and others in the educational disciplines.

== Recipients ==
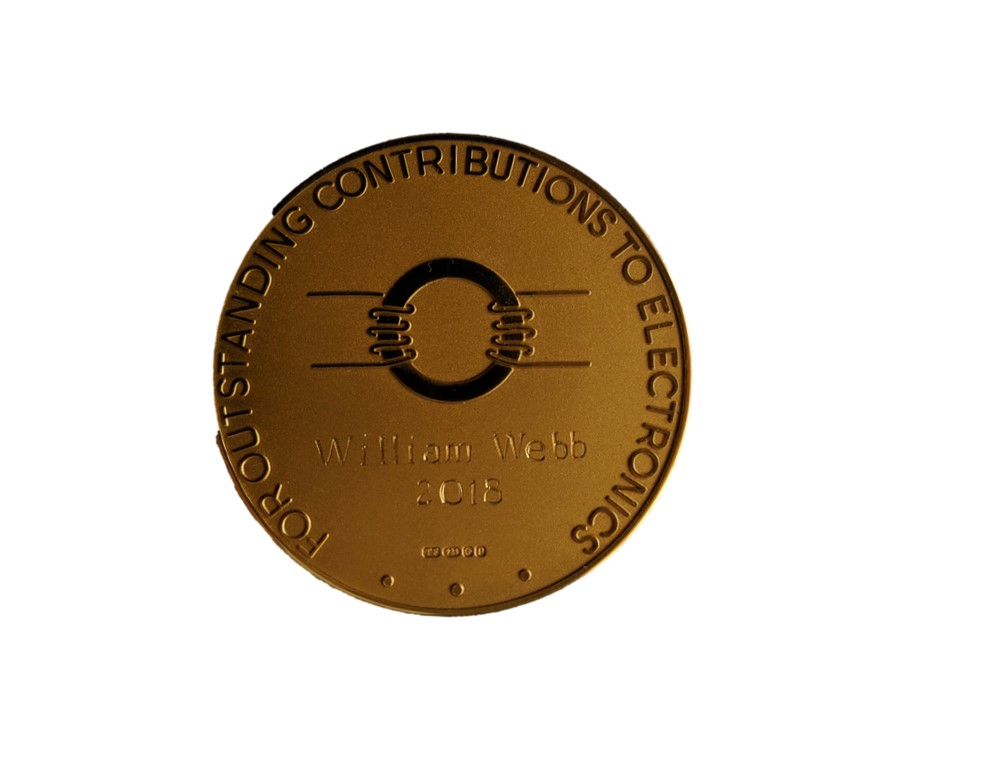
The rear view of the IET Mountbatten Medal, showing the award that was given to Dr. William Webb in 2018

As of November 2018

- 2025 - Steve Hodges
- 2024 - Alan Weinberg
- 2023 - No recipient
- 2022 - Santokh S Badesha
- 2021 - Nick McKeown
- 2020 - Tong Boon Tang
- 2019 - Irwin M. Jacobs
- 2018 - William Webb
- 2017 – Shuji Nakamura
- 2016 – Jean Armstrong
- 2015 – Alan Finkel
- 2014 – Ronjon Nag
- 2013 – Ian Nussey
- 2012 – Vincent Fusco
- 2011 – Peter McOwan
- 2010 – Eli Yablonovitch
- 2009 – David Ogden
- 2008 – Kevin Warwick
- 2007 – Andrew Blake
- 2006 – John Leighfield
- 2005 – Sir David Brown
- 2004 – Andy Hopper
- 2003 – Not awarded
- 2002 – Not awarded
- 2001 – David Payne
- 2000 – Hermann Hauser
- 1999 – Steve Shirley
- 1998 – J D Rhodes
- 1997 – Tom Kilburn and Maurice Wilkes
- 1996 – Tim Berners-Lee
- 1995 – Peter Bonfield
- 1994 – David E. Potter
- 1993 – W A Gambling
- 1992 – Ernest Harrison

== See also ==
- List of computer science awards
- List of computer-related awards
- List of engineering awards
- List of awards named after people
