= King-Sun Fu =

Taiwanese-American computer scientist (1930–1985)

- 傅京蓀
- Born: October 2, 1930; Nanking (now Nanjing), China
- Died: April 29, 1985 (aged 54); Washington, DC, US
- Education: National Taiwan University (BS); University of Toronto (MA); University of Illinois, Urbana-Champaign (PhD)
- Known for: IAPR King-Sun Fu Prize; The First President of IAPR
- Awards: National Science Foundation research grants (1961); Guggenheim Fellowship (1971); Fellow of IEEE (1971); Herbert Newby McCoy award (1976); Member of National Academy of Engineering (1976); Member of Academia Sinica (1978); IEEE Computer Society Honor Roll (1973) Appreciation (1977, 1979) Outstanding Paper Award (1977) Special Award (1982); ASEE Senior Research Award (1981); IEEE Education Medal (1982); AFIPS Harry Goode Memorial Award (1982); Chinese Institute of Engineers-USA (CIE-USA) Achievement (1983); IEEE Centennial Medal (1984)
- Scientific career
- Fields: Pattern recognition Image analysis
- Workplaces: Purdue University; Boeing Airplane Company (1959–1960); Seattle University (1960); Massachusetts Institute of Technology (1961); IBM Thomas J. Watson Research Center (1961); University of California, Berkeley (1967, 1972); Stanford University (1972); National Science Foundation (1972–1978); Engineering Committee of the Council (1976–1979); National Science Foundation (1978–1981)
- Thesis: An Approximation Method for Both Magnitude and Phase by Rational Functions (1959)
- Doctoral advisor: Mac Van Valkenburg

King-Sun Fu (Chinese: 傅京蓀; pinyin: Fù Jīngsūn; October 2, 1930 – April 29, 1985) was a Chinese-American computer scientist. He was a Goss Distinguished Professor at Purdue University School of Electrical and Computer Engineering in West Lafayette, Indiana. He was instrumental in the founding of International Association for Pattern Recognition (IAPR), served as its first president, and is widely recognized for his extensive and pioneering contributions to the field of pattern recognition (within computer image analysis) and machine intelligence. In honor of the memory of Professor King-Sun Fu, IAPR gives the biennial King-Sun Fu Prize to a living person in the recognition of an outstanding technical contribution to the field of pattern recognition. The first King-Sun Fu Prize was presented in 1988, to Azriel Rosenfeld.

== Biography ==
Fu was born on October 2, 1930, in Nanjing, then China's capital. He received B.S. from National Taiwan University in 1953, M.A. from University of Toronto in 1955, and Ph.D. from the University of Illinois, Urbana-Champaign in 1959.

Fu died on April 29, 1985, in Washington, DC.

== Academic life ==
Fu and others organized the First International Conference Pattern Recognition (ICPR) in 1973 and served as chairman. The conference later evolved into the formation of the International Association for Pattern Recognition by 1976 and was elected to be its president.

He reorganized the Pattern Recognition Committee and was its first chairman in 1974, which led to the founding of the IEEE Transactions on Pattern Analysis and Machine Intelligence (TPAMI) and he served as its first Editor-in-Chief in 1978.

King-Sun gave invited lectures in China almost every year over the past decades and was a Member of the Academia Sinica in 1978. He was instrumental in establishing the Microelectronics and Information Science and Technology Research Center at the National Chiao Tung University in 1984.

== Selected works ==
- 1968. Sequential Methods in Pattern Recognition. Academic
- 1970. Sequential Methods in Pattern Recognition and Machine Learning. New York: Academic
- 1974. Syntactic Methods in Pattern Recognition. New York: Academic.
- 1980. Statistical Pattern Classification Using Contextual Information. Wiley
- 1982. Syntactic Pattern Recognition and Applications. Prentice-Hall

== See also ==
- Syntactic pattern recognition
