= Shelia Guberman =

Ukrainian-American scientist (born 1930)

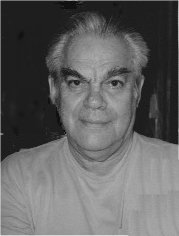
- Born: February 25, 1930 (age 96); Felsztyn, Kamianets-Podilskyi Oblast, USSR
- Citizenship: USSR, United States
- Scientific career
- Fields: Nuclear Physics, Computer Science, Geology, Geophysics, Artificial Intelligence, Psychology of Perception

Shelia Guberman (born 25 February 1930, Ukraine, USSR) is a scientist in computer science, nuclear physics, geology, geophysics, medicine, artificial intelligence and perception. He proposed the D-waves theory of Earth seismicity, algorithms of Gestalt-perception (1980) and Image segmentation, and programs for the technology of oil and gas fields exploration (1985).

== Life and career ==
He is the son of Aizik Guberman (writer, poet) and his wife Etya (teacher). From 1947 to 1952 Guberman studied at the Institute of Electrical Communications, Odessa, USSR, graduating in radio engineering. From 1952 to 1958 he worked as field geophysicist in the Soviet oil industry. From 1958 to 1961 he studied as a postgraduate at the Oil and Gas Institute in Moscow. In 1962 he received a PhD. in nuclear physics, followed by a PhD. in applied mathematics in 1971. In 1971 he was appointed for full professorship in computer science. After authoring the first applied pattern recognition program in 1962, Guberman specialized in artificial intelligence implementing principles of Gestalt perception in computer programs for geological data analysis. In 1966 he was invited by the outstanding mathematician of the XX century Prof. Israel Gelfand to lead the Artificial Intelligence team in Keldysh Institute of Applied Mathematics of the Russian Academy of Sciences. He applied the pattern recognition technology to earthquake prediction, oil and gas exploration, handwriting recognition, speech compression, and medical imaging. From 1989 to 1992 Guberman held the chair professorship at Moscow Open University (Department of Geography). Since 1992 he is living in the US. Guberman is the inventor of the handwriting recognition technology implemented in the commercial product by the company "Paragraph International" founded by Stepan Pachikov, and used today by Microsoft in Windows CE. He is author of core technologies for five US companies, and owns a patent on speech compression.

== Achievements ==
=== Handwriting recognition ===
The common approach to computer handwriting recognition was computer learning on a set of examples (characters or words) presented as visual objects. Guberman proposed that it is more adequate for the psycho-physiology of human perception to present the script as a kinematic object, a gesture, i.e. synergy of movements of the stylus producing the script.

Primitivs

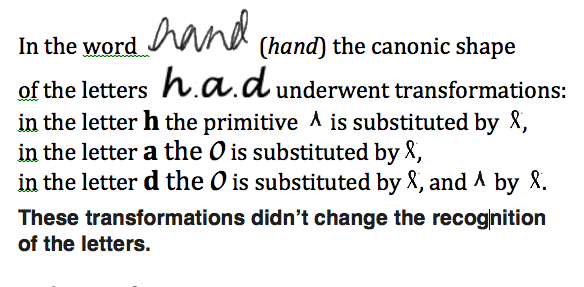
Transformation of letters

The handwriting consists of 7 primitives. The variations, which characters undergo during the writing, are restricted by the rule: each element can be transformed only into his neighbor in the ordered sequence of primitives. During the evolution of Latin-like writing acquired resistance to natural variations in character shape: when one of the primitives is substituted by his neighbor the interpretation of the character does not change to another one.

Based on this approach two USA companies Paragraph and Parascript developed the first commercial products for on-line and off-line free handwriting recognition, which were licensed by Apple, Microsoft, Boeing, Siemens and others. "Most commercially available natural handwriting software is based on ParaGraph or Parascript technology".

The hypothesis that humans perceive the handwriting as well as other linear drawings (in general – the communication signals) not in visual modality but in the motor modality was later confirmed by the discovery of mirror neurons. The difference is that in the classical mirroring phenomena the motor response appears in parallel with the observed movement ("immediate action perception"), and during the handwriting recognition the static stimulus is transformed into a time process by tracing the path of the pen on the paper. In both cases the observer is trying to understand the intention of the correspondent: "the understanding of what the person is doing and why he is doing it, is acquired through a mechanism that directly transforms visual information into a motor format".

=== Speech parallel coding ===
The speech is traditionally presented as a time sequence of phonemes - vowels and consonants. Each vowel is mainly determined by the relationship between the volume sizes of the front and the back of the voice tract. The ratio is defined by 1) horizontal position of tongue (back–forth), 2) the position of the lips (back-forth), and 3) the size of pharynx that can extend the cavity of the voice tract far back. Most consonants can be described with 3 parameters: 1) place of articulation (lips, teeth and so on), 2) time pattern of interaction with the voice tract (explosive or not), and 3) voiced or not voiced sound. Because of the inertia of the articulatory organs (tongue, lips, jaw) any phoneme interferes with the neighbors and changes its sounding (co-articulation). As a result, each phoneme sounds different in different context. Guberman presents the parallel model of speech production. It states that vowels and consonants are generated not in sequence but in parallel. The two channels manage two different gropes of muscles, which together define the geometry of the voice tract, and, respectively, voice signal. The separation is possible because the generation of vowels and of consonants involves different muscles. For the vowels [o], [u] the lips are managed by muscles Mentalis and Orbicularis Oris for protrusion and rounding, and for [i], [e] by Buccinator and Risorius for retracting the lips. The tongue participate in creating the vowels by innervating Superior Longitudinal and Vertical for lifting and for moving the whole tongue back and forth, and Genioglossus for all consonants articulated in the front of the mouth )when jaw is fixed). For the lip consonant [p], [b], [v], [f] the lips are managed by Labii Inferioris and Orbicularis Oris muscles for moving the lips and the jaw up and down, and Zygomaticus Minor for moving the lower lip back for [v], [f].
From the hypothesis of Parallel Phonetic Coding follows:
1. Because the vowels are defined as a particular ratio of front and back volumes of voice tract, the vowels are present at any moment of the speech (even during silence – the neutral vowel [ə] when no muscle of the voice tract is innervated).

2. Any consonant in speech appears on the background of a vowel. The last consonant in the word, is pronounced on the background of the neutral vowel [ə]. In clusters the consonants are produced in parallel with [ə] except the last one. In the past in Russian writing after consonant at the end of the word has to be written a special character denoting the neutral vowel – Ъ (the rule was canceled in 1918).

(N) Writing words soda and word in parallel code

3. The correct written code for words soda and word is shown in (N) where the number of vowels in syllable reflects the relative duration of the vowel. Such coding is used in Hebrew: in the word יצֵירֵ (peace) two points under characters denote vowel [e]). In Arabic the two channels carry different functions: the consonant stream keeps the meaning, (the root), and the vowel stream either modify the meaning of the root, or expresses a grammatical category: kitab means "book"; katib "writer"; ia-ktub-u "he is writing"; ma-ktab "school".

=== Giant oil/gas fields exploration ===
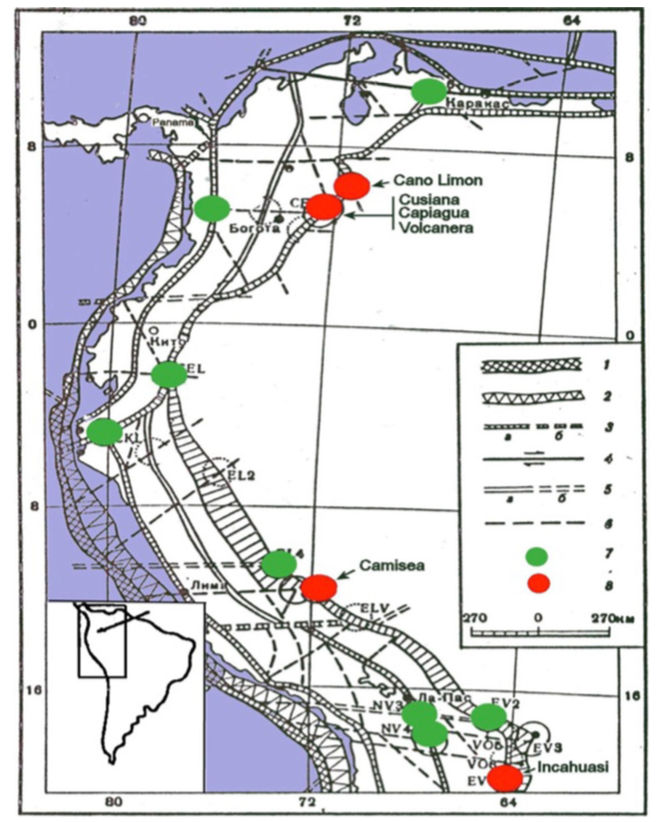
Prognostic map of Andes of South America published in 1986. Red and green circles – sites predicted as future discoveries of giant oil/gas fields. Red circles – where giants were really discovered. Green ones are still underdeveloped.

In the '70s and '80s Guberman developed an artificial intelligence software and the appropriate technology for geological applications, and used it for predicting places of giant oil/gas deposits.

In 1986 the team published a prognostic map for discovering giant oil and gas fields at the Andes in South America based on abiogenic petroleum origin theory. The model proposed by Prof. Yury Pikovsky (Moscow State University) assumes that petroleum moves from the mantel to the surface through permeable channels created at the intersection of deep faults. The technology uses 1) maps of morphostructural zoning (method proposed and developed by Prof. E.Rantsman), which outlines the morphostructural nodes (intersections of faults), and 2) pattern recognition program that identify nodes containing giant oil/gas fields. It was forecasted that eleven nodes, which had not been developed at that time, contain giant oil or gas fields. These 11 sites covered only 8% of the total area of all the Andes basins. 30 years later (in 2018) was published the result of comparing the prognosis and the reality. Since publication of the prognostic map in 1986, only six giant oil/gas fields were discovered in the Andes region: Cano–Limon, Cusiana, Capiagua, and Volcanera (Llanos basin, Colombia), Camisea (Ukayali basin, Peru), and Incahuasi (Chaco basin, Bolivia). All discoveries were made in places shown on the 1986 prognostic map as promising areas.

The result is convincingly positive, and this is a strong contribution in support of abiogenic theory of oil origin.

=== D-waves theory ===
In the middle of the 20th century, the attention of seismologists was attracted by the phenomenon of chains of earthquakes consistently arising along big faults. Later it was interpreted as waves of tectonic strain In 1975 Guberman proposed the D-waves theory that separates the local processes of stress accumulation and the triggering of earthquakes. The basic postulates of this theory are: a) a strong earthquake changes the distribution of mass in the Earth's core and accordingly its rate of rotation ω; b) at times when ω reaches a local minimum the disturbances occur at both poles, which propagate along meridians at a constant rate of 0.15°/year (D waves); c) A strong earthquake occurs at the place where tectonic stresses have accumulated, and at a time when two D waves (from poles N and S) have met at that point. (Fig ).

This hypothesis and its consequences were supported by seismological data.

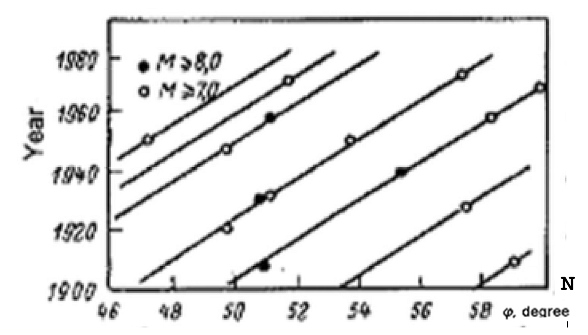
Alaska D-waves

1. The postulate c) is presented at the plot ( ) where φ is a latitude of a strong earthquake, and T is its time of occurrence. Each line presents a D-wave travelling the Earth with constant speed 0.15°/year triggering along the way strong earthquakes. The dots present the strong earthquake in the Aleutian Islands and Alaska (magnitude M ≥ 7.0). Similar results were demonstrated for California, South-eastern Europe, Asia Minor, Southern Chile, South Sandwich Island, New Zealand, France and Italy The probability that this can happen by chance is < 0,025 in each case.

2. The source of irregularity in Earth rotation could be a strong earthquake, which displaced huge masses of rocks, and

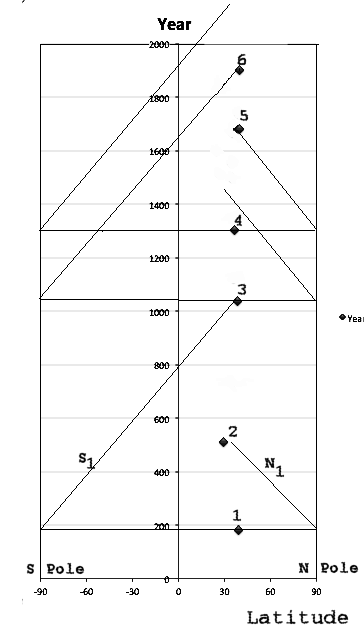
China: A chain of strong earthquakes triggered by D-waves (180–1902 A.D.)

for keeping the rotational moment of the Earth constant the angular speed of rotation ω has to be changed Because of the low speed of the D-waves (0.15°/year), it takes more than 200 years after occurrence to reach the areas where earthquakes with magnitude M >8 occur. To test the postulate b) very long time interval of seismological records is needed. In China, the seismic history has been documented for a very long period of time (from 180 A.D.). The time-space relations between the 6 strongest documented earthquakes in China are presented at the plot. The earthquake #1 created at the poles two D-waves. The one moves from the North Pole, and in 332 years triggered the earthquake #2; the second wave moves from the South Pole, and in 858 years achieved the location of the earthquake #3, and so on (see the graph). In total, the average deviation of the position of the D-wave at the time of the event and the location of the triggered earthquake is 0.4°, which is less than the error in determining the position of the epicenter of the historical earthquakes. 3. From the hypothesis of D-waves it follows that epicenters of the strongest earthquakes can predominantly occur at the discrete D-latitudes (90/2n)·i (i = 0, 1, 2, ...), with n ≤ 5. To test this statement the areas of high seismicity on the Earth were divided in stripes parallel to D-latitudes of order ≤ 4 each 5.625° width (see the map).

Position of strong earthquakes relative to the D-latitudes

In 43 regions earthquakes with M ≥ 8.0 occurred, in each region the strongest earthquake was chosen, and in 31 regions the epicenter of the strongest earthquake are located close to the D-latitude, i.e. located in the stripe around the D-latitude 1° wide. The stripe is 1° wide, and occupies 0.36 part of the area of each region, which is 5.625° wide. If the epicenters are randomly scattered over each of the 43 regions, the expected number of epicenters, which will occur close to the D-latitude would be 43 x 0.36 = 15, and the probability that 31 epicenter will be located inside the stripe is less than 0.005.

The earthquakes are an essential part of tectonic movements on the Earth. It was shown that strong earthquakes occur in the intersection of faults – morphostructural nodes. It means that not only the earthquakes are located near the D-latitudes, but also the big morphostructural knots do as well. Combining it with Prof Pikovsky's hypothesis that the morphostructural knots are pipes that deliver the oil from the mantle to the crust of the Earth follows that big oil/gas fields has also be predominantly located at the discrete D-latitudes. It was proved in, and the appropriate parameter (distance to the D-latitude) was used in the search for giant oil/gas fields (see above). The fact that the strong earthquakes occur on discrete D-latitudes influences the tectonic configuration of the net of tectonic faults. It was also found that in the morphostructural knots happens most accidents on oil, gas, and water pipelines, and railroad rails.

=== Computer medical diagnosis ===
Two types of treatment exist for patients with hemorrhagic strokes: passive (medicamental) and active (surgical). Prof. E. Kandel (one of the pioneers in surgical treatment of hemorrhagic strokes) turned to the outstanding mathematician Prof. I. Gelfand for help in comparing the effectiveness of these two treatments. Guberman was chosen as the main architect of the project. First, it was decided changing the goal: instead of choosing the best treatment in general finding the best treatment for a particular patient – conservative or operational ("treat the patient not the disease"). For this it was decided to use the pattern recognition technology developed in the past for geology (see above). Two decision rules have to be developed: 1) for predicting the outcome (life or death) of the conservative treatment of the particular patient, 2) for predicting the outcome (life or death) of the surgery of the same patient. The decisions are based on neurological and general symptoms collected at the first 12 hours after the patient arrived in the hospital. The obtained decision rules were preliminary tested for two years: the collected data were sent to the computer, and the two prognoses (forecasted outcomes of the operation and the conservative treatment) were placed in the patient's file. A month later the computer predictions were compared with the outcomes. The overall result – 90% correct predictions. Then followed the clinical implementation: the computer decisions were immediately sent to the surgeon on duty who makes the final decision. In five years, 90 patients received computer forecasts. In 16 cases the computer strongly recommended the operation. 11 of them were operated and survived. For 5 patients the computer warning was neglected (for different reasons), and all 5 died. In 5 cases it was strongly recommended avoiding operation. 3 of them were treated accordingly and survive, 2 of them were operated contrary to the computer advice and died.

== Positions ==
- 1966–1991 Chief scientist, Keldysh Institute of Applied Mathematics, Moscow (Russia)
- 1989–1992: Chaired Professorship, Russian Open University (Moscow), Department of Geography.
- 1989–1997 Chief Scientist, ParaGraph International, Campbell, CA, US
- 1995–1996 Visiting Scientist, Lawrence Berkeley National Laboratory, CA, US
- 1998–2007 Founder & CEO, Digital Oil Technologies, Cupertino, CA, US

== Publications ==
More than 180 papers published in scientific journals in Russia, US, France, Germany, Italy and Austria.

Selected recent papers on computer science and psychology:

- 2017: "Gestalt Theory Rearranged: Back to Wertheimer", in "Frontiers in Psychology"
- 2015: "On Gestalt Theory Principles", Gestalt Theory, 37(1), 25 - 44.
- 2012 (with Vadim V. Maximov and Alex Pashintsev): "Gestalt and Image Understanding", Gestalt Theory, 34(2), 143 - 166.
- 2013: Critical review of Desolneux, Moisan & Morel (2008): From Gestalt Theory to Image Analysis. In: Gestalt Theory 35(2), 183–206.
- 2008: What is «self-organization»? A journey of a small child. 7th Congress of the UES Systems Science European Union Lisbon, Dec. 17–19, 2008.
- 2004: "Reflections on Ludwig Bertalanffy's "General System Theory: Foundations, Development, Applications". Gestalt Theory, 26(1), 45 – 57.
- 2002: "Clustering Analysis as a Gestalt Problem." Gestalt Theory, 24(2), 143 – 158.
- 2001: "Reflections on M. Wertheimer`s "Productive Thinking": Lesson to Artificial Intelligence. Gestalt Theory, 23(2).

Selected paper on tectonophysics:

- 1972: Guberman, Sh. (1972), "Criteria of high seismicity determined by pattern recognition.", Tectonophysics, 13 (1–4): 415–422 v.13, Bibcode:1972Tectp..13..415G, doi:10.1016/0040-1951(72)90031-5

Books:

- 1987: "Non-formal data analysis in geology and geophysics", Nedra, Moscow.
- 1962: "Theory of similarity and interpretation of nuclear well-log date", Nedra, Moscow.
- 2007: with Gianfranco Minati "Dialogue about Systems", Polimetrica, Italy. ISBN 978-8876990618
- 2009: "Unorthodox Geology and Geophysics. Oil, Ores and Earthquakes", Polimetrica, Italy. ISBN 978-8876991356

== Sources about his work ==
- Zueva E. (2009), "The history of computer vision in the Keldysh Institute of Applied Mathematics of the Russian Academy of Sciences" (PDF), Mathematical Machines and Systems (4)
- E.M.Kudryavtsev, E.F.Maklyaev, S.D.Zotov and A.A.Lebedev (2009), "Comparison of Hypothetical D-Waves of Planetary Scale, Causing Earthquakes in Sh.A.Guberman's Model, with Slow Solitary Elastic Waves (SSEWs) Detected Experimentally", Bulletin of the Lebedev Physics Institute, 36 (9): 277–281, Bibcode:2009BLPI...36..277K, doi:10.3103/S106833560909005X, S2CID 121955600
- Joel N. Shurkin (1994), "Thoroughly Electronic Russian", San Jose Mercury News West Magazine, pp. 8–12
