= Center of Excellence for Document Analysis and Recognition =

The Center of Excellence for Document Analysis and Recognition (CEDAR) is a research laboratory at the University at Buffalo, State University of New York. The center was established with funding from the United States Postal Service and National Institute of Justice. CEDAR was formalized by the United States Postal Service by Postmaster General Anthony Frank in 1991.The primary goal of CEDAR was to conduct research and development for developing software useful for the automation of postal sorting equipment. Work at CEDAR, with Sargur Srihari as principal investigator, led to the first handwritten address interpretation system in the world. CEDAR-FOX, the first system for automatic comparison of handwriting for the purpose of forensic analysis, was developed at CEDAR.

== Handwritten Analysis Interpretation ==
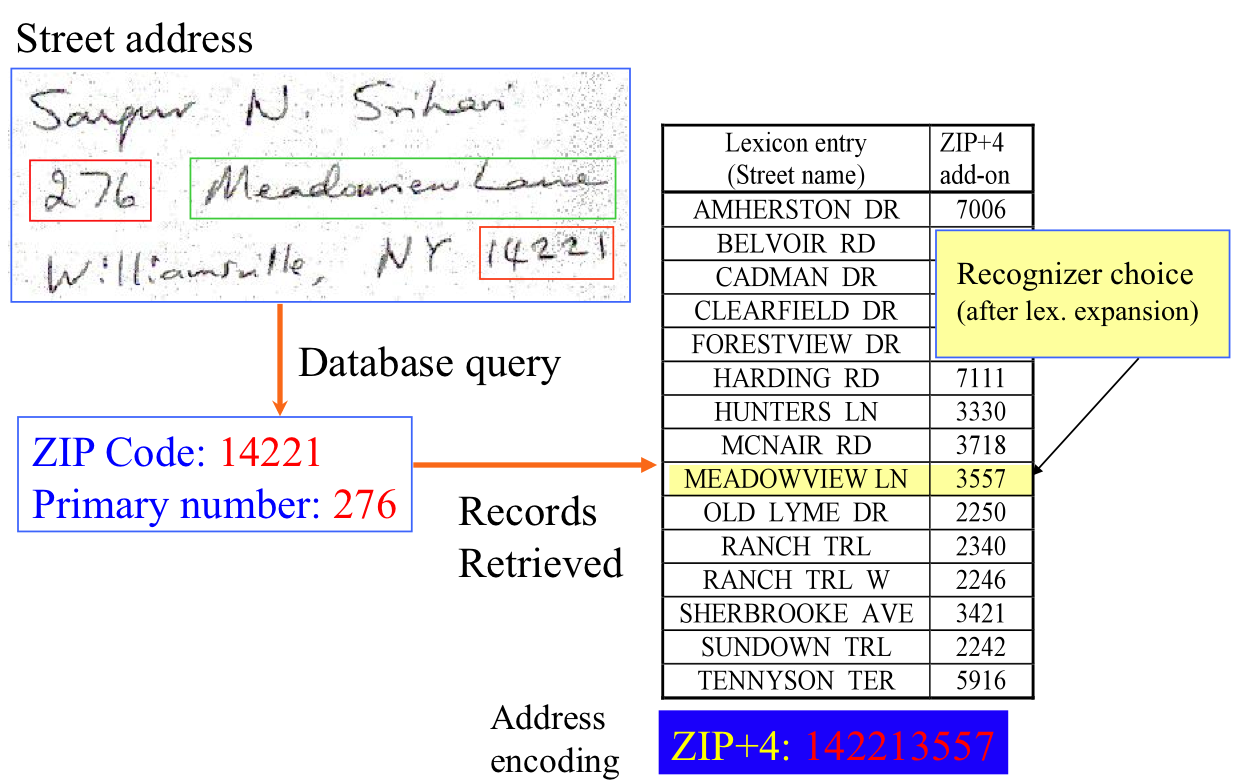
Method used for exploiting contextual information in the first handwritten address interpretation system developed by Sargur Srihari and Jonathan Hull.

HandWritten Address Interpretation is a software system developed at CEDAR. Known as HWAI, it was first deployed by the United States Postal Service through its contractor Lockheed-Martin in Tampa, Florida during the holiday December season in 1997. Initially 10% of the handwritten mail was successfully sorted and the project was considered a success. This was due to the large volume of mail that the US Postal Service processes and the cost of labor involved. The key to the success was the discovery of a heuristic by researchers Sargur Srihari and Jonathan Hull that the street number and ZIP code could be relatively easily recognized, because they only consist of numerals, which could then be used to constrain the possible street. Subsequent improvements to HWAI led to a 45% sort rate with a 2% error rate. Today more than 95% of the handwritten mail is sorted automatically. Versions of HWAI were developed for Australia Post and UK Royal Mail.
