= International Conference on Document Analysis and Recognition =

The International Conference on Document Analysis and Recognition (ICDAR) is an international academic conference, sponsored by the International Association for Pattern Recognition. The conference held annually, each time in a different country. It is about character and symbol recognition, printed/handwritten text recognition, graphics analysis and recognition, document analysis, document understanding, historical documents and digital libraries, document based forensics, camera and video based scene text analysis.

== History ==
ICDAR was held every second year between 1991 and 2023. It then transitioned to be an annual conference. The host country changes every time and the conference has taken place on five different continents so far. An attempt is made to rotate around the world between Europe-Africa, Asia-Australia and the Americas - depending on the availability of hosts.

Year	Country	City	Website
1991	France	Saint-Malo	
1993	Japan	Tsukuba, Ibaraki	
1995	Canada	Montreal	
1997	Germany	Ulm	
1999	India	Bangalore	
2001	United States	Seattle	
2003	Scotland	Edinburgh	
2005	Korea	Seoul	
2007	Brazil	Curitiba	
2009	Spain	Barcelona	
2011	China	Peking	
2013	United States	Washington, D.C.	https://iapr.org/archives/icdar2013/
2015	France	Nancy	https://iapr.org/archives/icdar2015/
2017	Japan	Kyoto	https://iapr.org/archives/icdar2017/
2019	Australia	Sydney	https://iapr.org/archives/icdar2019/
2021	Switzerland	Lausanne	https://iapr.org/archives/icdar2021/
2023	United States	San Jose, CA	https://iapr.org/archives/icdar2023/
2024	Greece	Athens	https://icdar2024.net/
2025	China	Wuhan	https://www.icdar2025.com/
2026	Austria	Vienna	https://icdar2026.org/
2027	Malaysia	Kuala Lumpur	

== See also ==
- International Association for Pattern Recognition
