= International Association for Pattern Recognition =

Organization

- Abbreviation: IAPR
- Formation: 1978; 47 years ago
- Founder: King-Sun Fu
- Fields: Machine learning
- Website: https://www.iapr.org

The International Association for Pattern Recognition (IAPR), is an international association of organizations dedicated to computer vision or pattern recognition. It only admits one organization per country or territory. Individual people participate in the IAPR through their own country or territory's organization.

The IAPR was founded by Purdue University computer scientist King-Sun Fu in 1978.

== Publications ==
The IAPR publishes four main academic publications of record:

- The IAPR Newsletter, which is published quarterly
- Pattern Recognition Letters, which is published monthly by Elsevier (ISSN 0167-8655)
- Machine Vision and Applications, which is published bimonthly by Springer Verlag
- International Journal on Document Analysis and Recognition, which is published quarterly by Springer Verlag

== Conferences ==
Conferences run by the IAPR include:

- The International Conference on Pattern Recognition (ICPR)
  - 2014—Stockholm, Sweden
  - 2016—Santiago, Chile
  - 2018—Beijing, China
  - 2020—Milan, Italy
  - 2022—Montreal, Canada
  - 2024—Biswa Bangla Convention Centre, Kolkata, India
- The International Conference on Pattern Recognition in Bioinformatics (PRIB)
- The International Conference on Pattern Recognition and Image Analysis (PRIA)
- The International Conference on Document Analysis and Recognition (ICDAR)
  - 2013—Washington, DC, USA
  - 2015—Nancy, France
  - 2017—Kyoto, Japan
  - 2019—Sydney, Australia
  - 2021—Lausanne, Switzerland
  - 2023—San Jose, California, USA

The IAPR Fellow Award has been awarded biennially since 1994 to recognize distinguished contributions to the field of pattern recognition.
