= Tablet computer =

Mobile computer with integrated display, circuitry, and battery

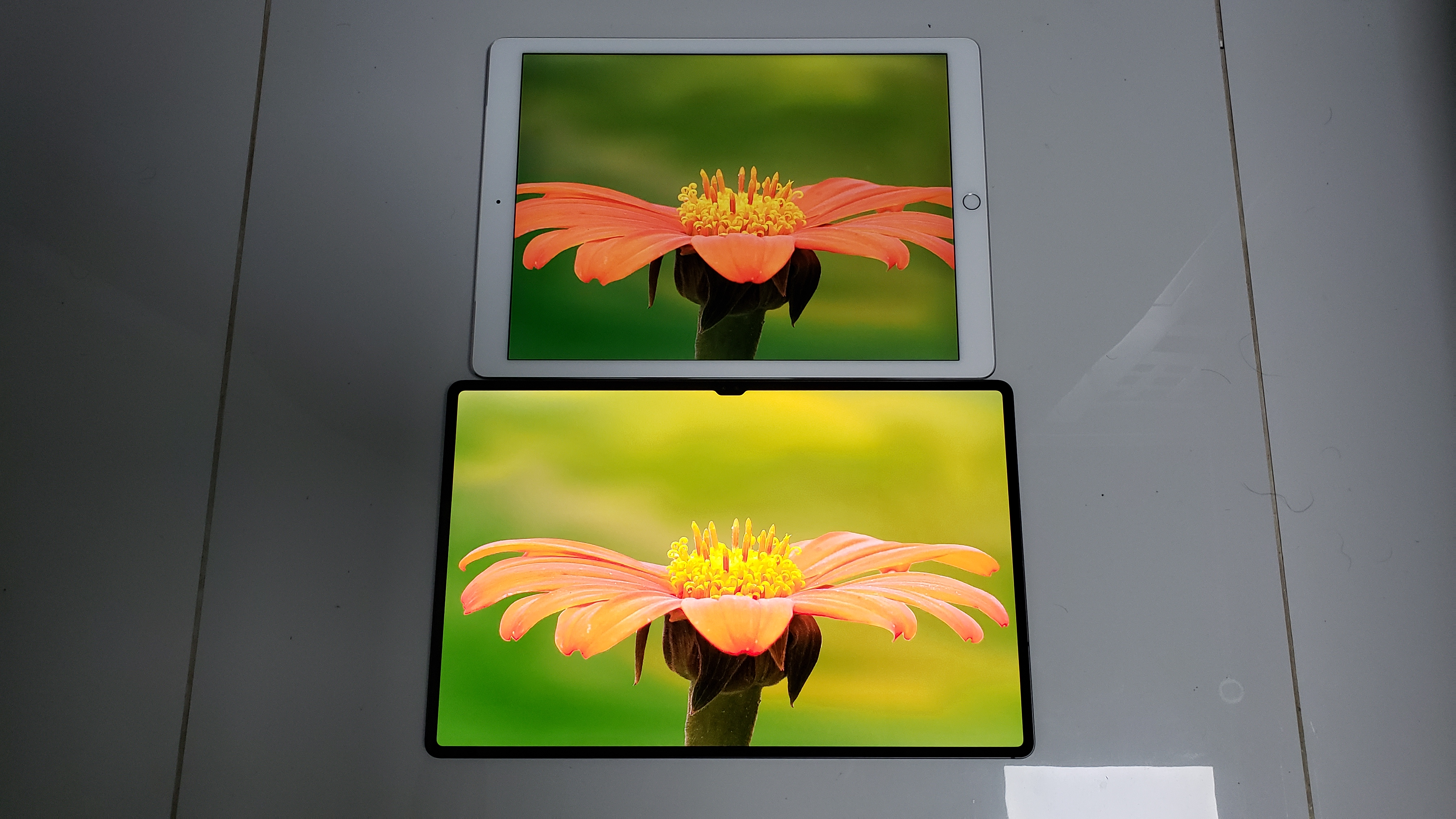
Two large-sized tablet computers shown: the iPad Pro (1st generation) from 2015 at 12.9 inches diagonally (top), and the Samsung Galaxy Tab S8 Ultra from 2022 at 14.6 inches diagonally (bottom)

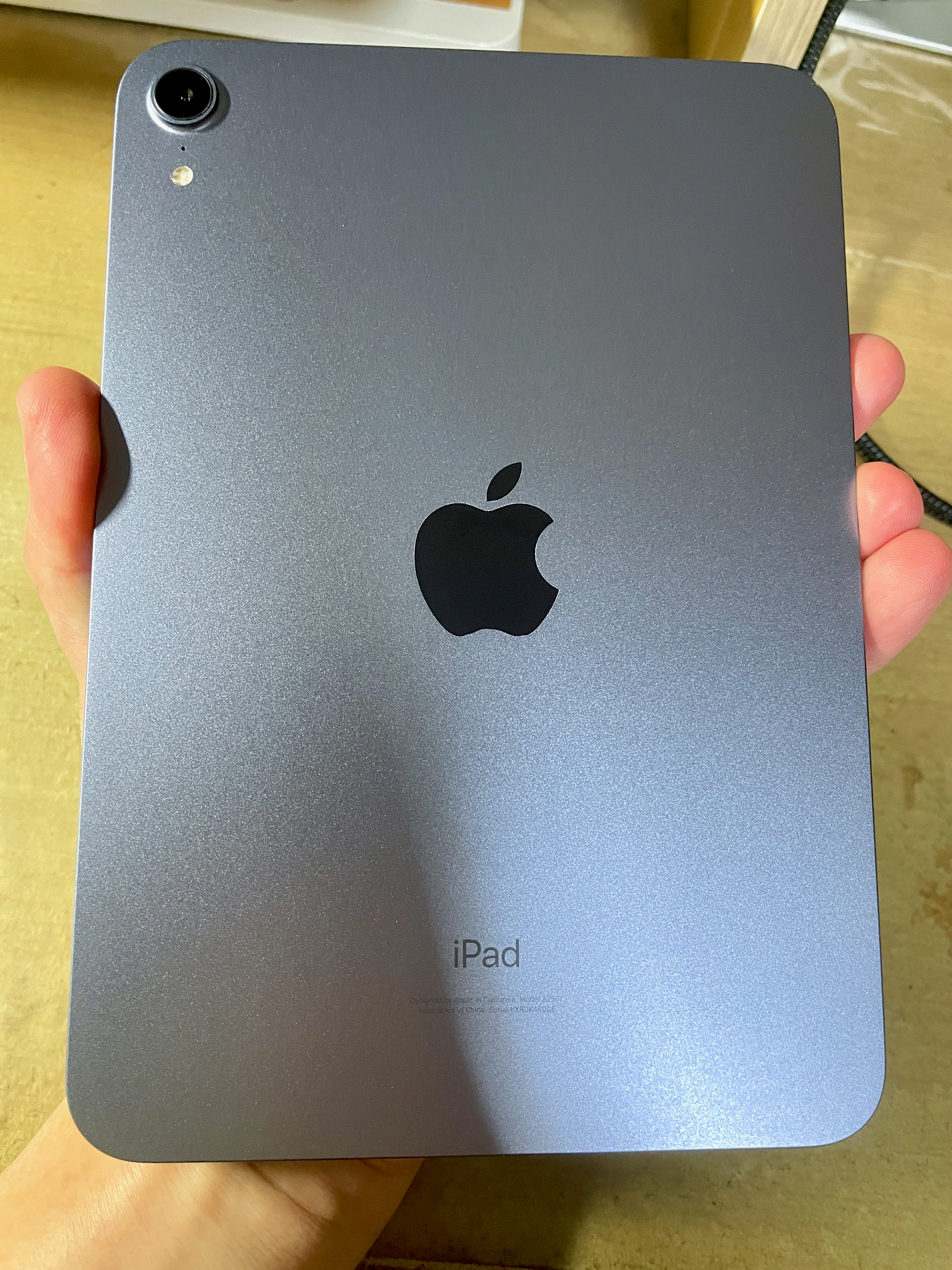
A small and one-handed tablet computer, the iPad Mini (6th generation)

A tablet computer (Note: Commonly shortened to tablet PC, tablet or simply tab.) is a mobile device, typically with a mobile operating system and touchscreen display processing circuitry, and a rechargeable battery in a single, thin and flat package. Tablets, being computers, have similar capabilities, but lack some input/output (I/O) abilities that others have. Many modern tablets are based on smartphones, the only differences being that tablets are relatively larger than smartphones, with screens from around 7 inches (18 cm) to 14.6 inches (37 cm) measured diagonally, and may not support access to a cellular network. Unlike laptops (which have traditionally run off operating systems usually designed for desktops), tablets usually run mobile operating systems, alongside smartphones.

The touchscreen display is operated by gestures executed by finger or digital pen (stylus), instead of the mouse, touchpad, and keyboard of larger computers. Portable computers can be classified according to the presence and appearance of physical keyboards. Two species of tablet, the slate and booklet, do not have physical keyboards and usually accept text and other input by use of a virtual keyboard shown on their touchscreen displays. To compensate for their lack of a physical keyboard, most tablets can connect to independent physical keyboards by Bluetooth or USB; 2-in-1 PCs have keyboards, distinct from tablets.

The form of the tablet was conceptualized in the middle of the 20th century (Stanley Kubrick depicted fictional tablets in the 1968 science fiction film 2001: A Space Odyssey) and prototyped and developed in the last two decades of that century. In 2010, Apple released the iPad, the first mass-market tablet to achieve widespread popularity. Thereafter, tablets rapidly rose in ubiquity and soon became a large product category used for personal, educational and workplace applications. Popular uses for a tablet PC include viewing presentations, video-conferencing, reading e-books, watching movies, sharing photos, and more. As of 2021 there are 1.28 billion tablet users worldwide according to data provided by Statista. As of 2025, Apple holds the largest manufacturer market share followed by Samsung and Lenovo.

== History ==
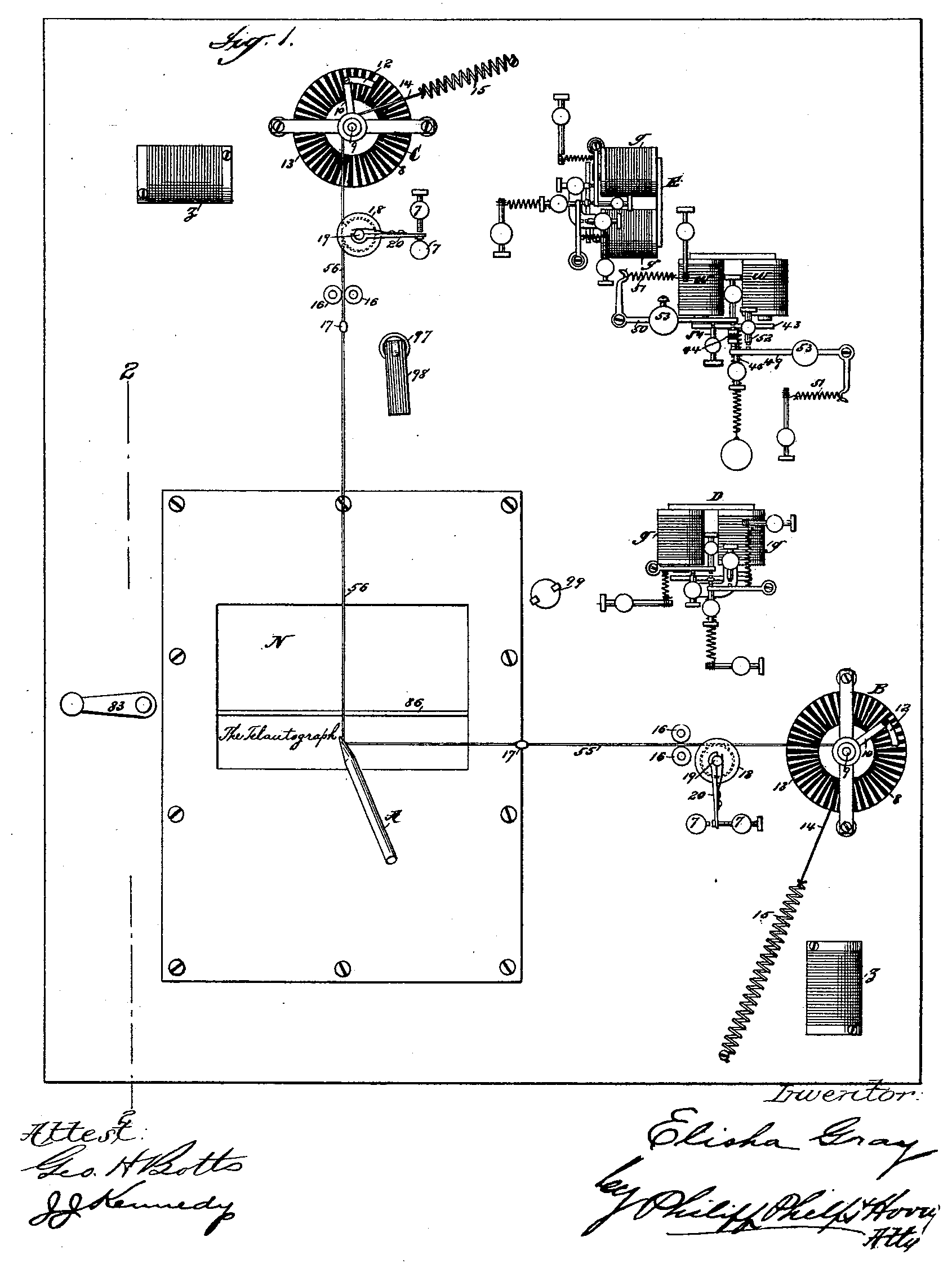
1888 telautograph patent schema

The tablet computer and its associated operating system began with the development of pen computing. Electrical devices with data input and output on a flat information display existed as early as 1888 with the telautograph, which used a sheet of paper as display and a pen attached to electromechanical actuators. Throughout the 20th century devices with these characteristics have been imagined and created whether as blueprints, prototypes, or commercial products. In addition to many academic and research systems, several companies released commercial products in the 1980s, with various input/output types tried out.

=== Fictional and prototype tablets ===
Wireless tablet device portrayed in the movie 2001: A Space Odyssey (1968)

Tablet computers appeared in a number of works of science fiction in the second half of the 20th century; all helped to promote and disseminate the concept to a wider audience. Examples include:

- Isaac Asimov described a Calculator Pad in his novel Foundation (1951)
- Stanisław Lem described the Opton in his novel Return from the Stars (1961)
- Numerous similar devices were depicted in Gene Roddenberry's Star Trek: The Original Series (1966)
- Dr Who: The Dominators Educator Balan holds a tablet which he inputs data into using swipe gestures (1967)
- Arthur C. Clarke's newspad was depicted in Stanley Kubrick's film 2001: A Space Odyssey (1968)
- Douglas Adams described a tablet computer in The Hitchhiker's Guide to the Galaxy and the associated comedy of the same name (1978)
- The science fiction TV series Star Trek: The Next Generation featured tablet computers which were designated as PADDs, notable for (as with most computers in the show) using a touchscreen interface, both with and without a stylus (1987)
- A device more powerful than today's tablets appeared briefly in The Mote in God's Eye (1974)
- The Star Wars franchise features datapads, first described in print in the 1991 novel Heir to the Empire, and depicted on screen in the 1999 feature film, Star Wars: Episode I – The Phantom Menace

Further, real-life projects either proposed or created tablet computers, such as:

- In 1968, computer scientist Alan Kay envisioned a KiddiComp; he developed and described the concept as a Dynabook in his proposal, A personal computer for children of all ages (1972), which outlines functionality similar to that supplied via a laptop computer, or (in some of its other incarnations) a tablet or slate computer, with the exception of near eternal battery life. The target audience was children.
- In 1979, the idea of a touchscreen tablet that could detect an external force applied to one point on the screen was patented in Japan by a team at Hitachi consisting of Masao Hotta, Yoshikazu Miyamoto, Norio Yokozawa and Yoshimitsu Oshima, who later received a US patent for their idea.
- In 1984, Hartmut Esslinger created a touchscreen Macintosh concept, featuring a touch display and a keyboard, a prototype of which sits in the San Francisco Museum of Modern Art
- In 1992, Atari showed developers the Stylus, later renamed ST-Pad. The ST-Pad was based on the TOS/GEM Atari ST platform and prototyped early handwriting recognition. Shiraz Shivji's company Momentus demonstrated in the same time a failed x86 MS-DOS based Pen Computer with its own graphical user interface (GUI).
- In 1994, the European Union initiated the NewsPad project, inspired by Clarke and Kubrick's fictional work. Acorn Computers developed and delivered an ARM-based touch screen tablet computer for this program, branding it the "NewsPad"; the project ended in 1997.
- During the November 2000 COMDEX, Microsoft used the term Tablet PC to describe a prototype handheld device they were demonstrating.
- In 2001, Ericsson Mobile Communications announced an experimental product named the DelphiPad, which was developed in cooperation with the Centre for Wireless Communications in Singapore, with a touch-sensitive screen, Netscape Navigator as a web browser, and Linux as its operating system.

=== Early tablets ===
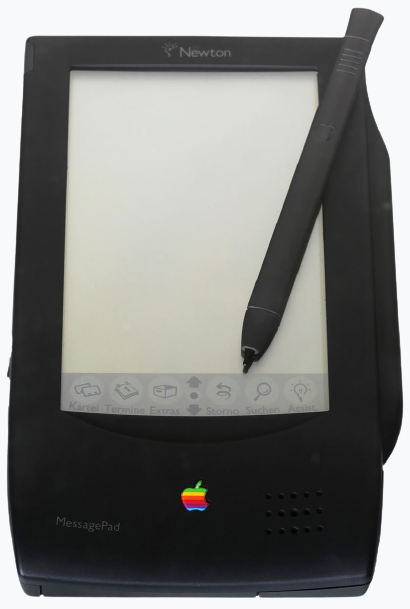
MessagePad, Apple's first produced tablet, released in 1993

Following earlier tablet computer products such as the Pencept PenPad, the Linus Write-Top, and the CIC Handwriter, in September 1989, Grid Systems released the first commercially successful tablet computer, the GridPad. All four products were based on extended versions of the MS-DOS operating system. In 1992, IBM announced (in April) and shipped to developers (in October) the ThinkPad 700T (2521), which ran the GO Corporation's PenPoint OS. Also based on PenPoint was AT&T's EO Personal Communicator from 1993, which ran on AT&T's own hardware, including their own AT&T Hobbit CPU. Apple Computer launched the Apple Newton personal digital assistant in 1993. It used Apple's own new Newton OS, initially running on hardware manufactured by Motorola and incorporating an ARM CPU, that Apple had specifically co-developed with Acorn Computers. The operating system and platform design were later licensed to Sharp and Digital Ocean, who went on to manufacture their own variants.

Pen computing was highly hyped by the media during the early 1990s. Microsoft, the dominant PC software vendor, released Windows for Pen Computing in 1992 to compete against PenPoint OS. The company launched the WinPad project, working together with OEMs such as Compaq, to create a small device with a Windows-like operating system and handwriting recognition. However, the project was abandoned two years later; instead Windows CE was released in the form of "Handheld PCs" in 1996. That year, Palm, Inc. released the first of the Palm OS based PalmPilot touch and stylus based PDA, the touch based devices initially incorporating a Motorola Dragonball (68000) CPU. Also in 1996 Fujitsu released the Stylistic 1000 tablet format PC, running Microsoft Windows 95, on a 100 MHz AMD486 DX4 CPU, with 8 MB RAM offering stylus input, with the option of connecting a conventional Keyboard and mouse. Intel announced a StrongARM processor-based touchscreen tablet computer in 1999, under the name WebPAD. It was later re-branded as the "Intel Web Tablet". In 2000, Norwegian company Screen Media AS and the German company Dosch & Amand Gmbh released the "FreePad". It was based on Linux and used the Opera browser. Internet access was provided by DECT DMAP, only available in Europe and provided up to 10 Mbit/s. The device had 16 MB storage, 32 MB of RAM and x86 compatible 166 MHz "Geode"-Microcontroller by National Semiconductor. The screen was 10.4" or 12.1" and was touch sensitive. It had slots for SIM cards to enable support of television set-up box. FreePad were sold in Norway and the Middle East; but the company was dissolved in 2003. Sony released its Airboard tablet in Japan in late 2000 with full wireless Internet capabilities.

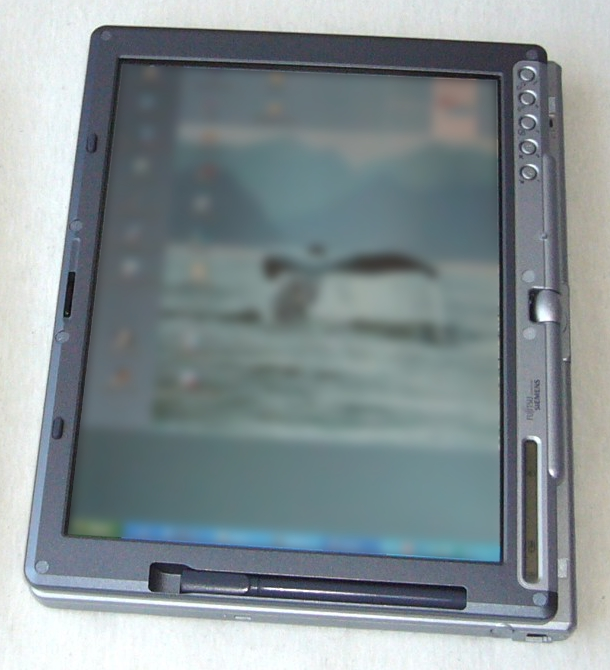
A Fujitsu Siemens Lifebook tablet running Windows XP, released in 2003

In the late 1990s, Microsoft launched the Handheld PC platform using their Windows CE operating system; while most devices were not tablets, a few touch enabled tablets were released on the platform such as the Fujitsu PenCentra 130 or Siemens's SIMpad. Microsoft took a more significant approach to tablets in 2002 as it attempted to define the Microsoft Tablet PC as a mobile computer for field work in business, though their devices failed, mainly due to pricing and usability decisions that limited them to their original purpose – such as the existing devices being too heavy to be held with one hand for extended periods, and having legacy applications created for desktop interfaces and not well adapted to the slate format.

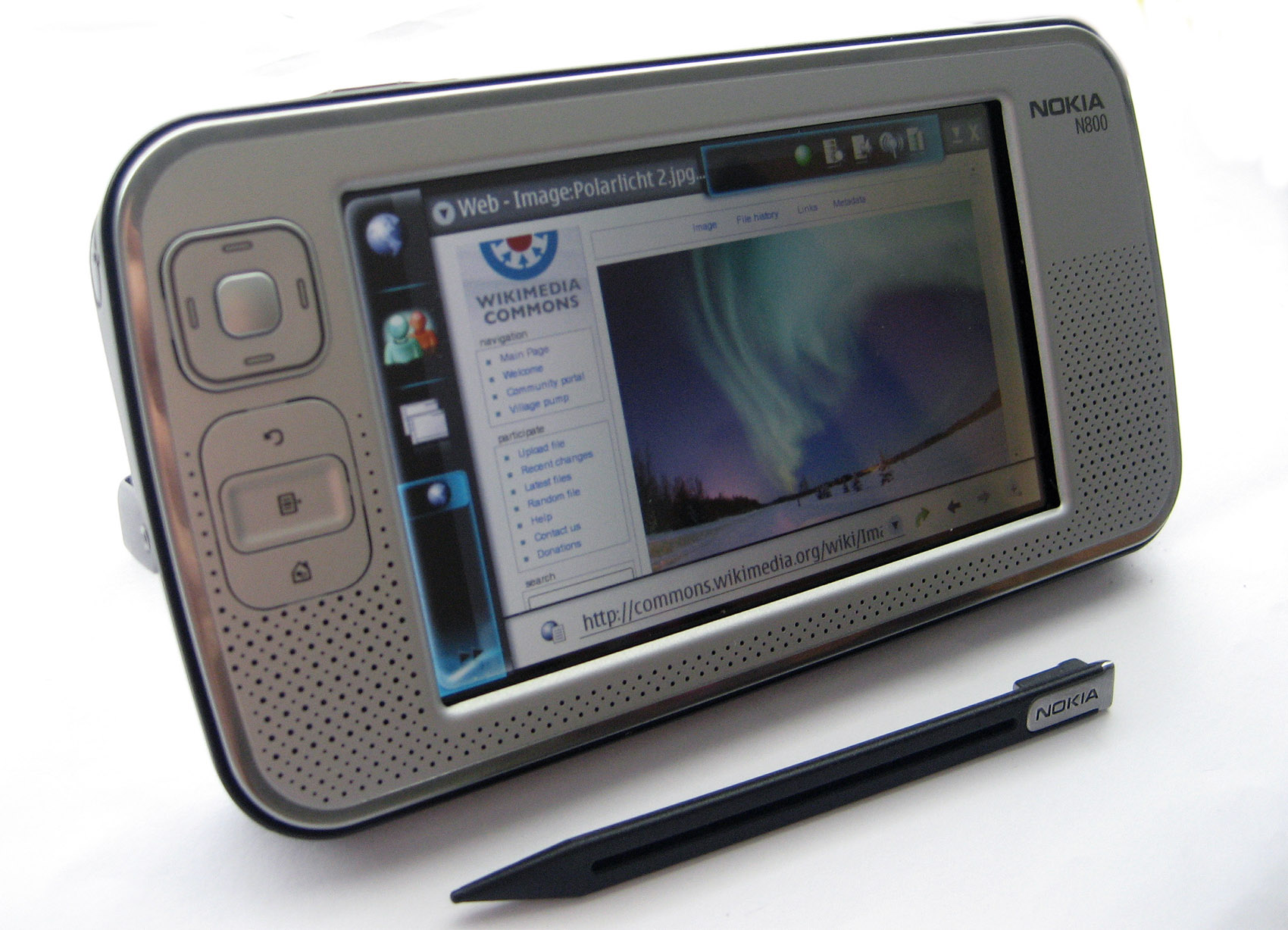
The Nokia N800, the second tablet manufactured by Nokia

Nokia had plans for an Internet tablet since before 2000. An early model was test manufactured in 2001, the Nokia M510, which was running on EPOC and featuring an Opera browser, speakers and a 10-inch 800×600 screen, but it was not released because of fears that the market was not ready for it. Nokia entered the tablet space in May 2005 with the Nokia 770 running Maemo, a Debian-based Linux distribution custom-made for their Internet tablet line. The user interface and application framework layer, named Hildon, was an early instance of a software platform for generic computing in a tablet device intended for internet consumption. But Nokia did not commit to it as their only platform for their future mobile devices and the project competed against other in-house platforms and later replaced it with the Series 60. Nokia used the term internet tablet to refer to a portable information appliance that focused on Internet use and media consumption, in the range between a personal digital assistant (PDA) and an Ultra-Mobile PC (UMPC). They made two mobile phones, the N900 that runs Maemo, and N9 that run Meego.

Before the release of iPad, Axiotron introduced an aftermarket, heavily modified Apple MacBook called Modbook, a Mac OS X-based tablet computer. The Modbook uses Apple's Inkwell for handwriting and gesture recognition, and uses digitization hardware from Wacom. To get Mac OS X to talk to the digitizer on the integrated tablet, the Modbook was supplied with a third-party driver.

Following the launch of the Ultra-mobile PC, Intel began the Mobile Internet Device initiative, which took the same hardware and combined it with a tabletized Linux configuration. Intel codeveloped the lightweight Moblin (mobile Linux) operating system following the successful launch of the Atom CPU series on netbooks. In 2010, Nokia and Intel combined the Maemo and Moblin projects to form MeeGo, a Linux-based operating system supports netbooks and tablets. The first tablet using MeeGo was the Neofonie WeTab launched September 2010 in Germany. The WeTab used an extended version of the MeeGo operating system called WeTab OS. WeTab OS adds runtimes for Android and Adobe AIR and provides a proprietary user interface optimized for the WeTab device. On September 27, 2011, the Linux Foundation announced that MeeGo would be replaced in 2012 by Tizen.

=== Modern tablets ===
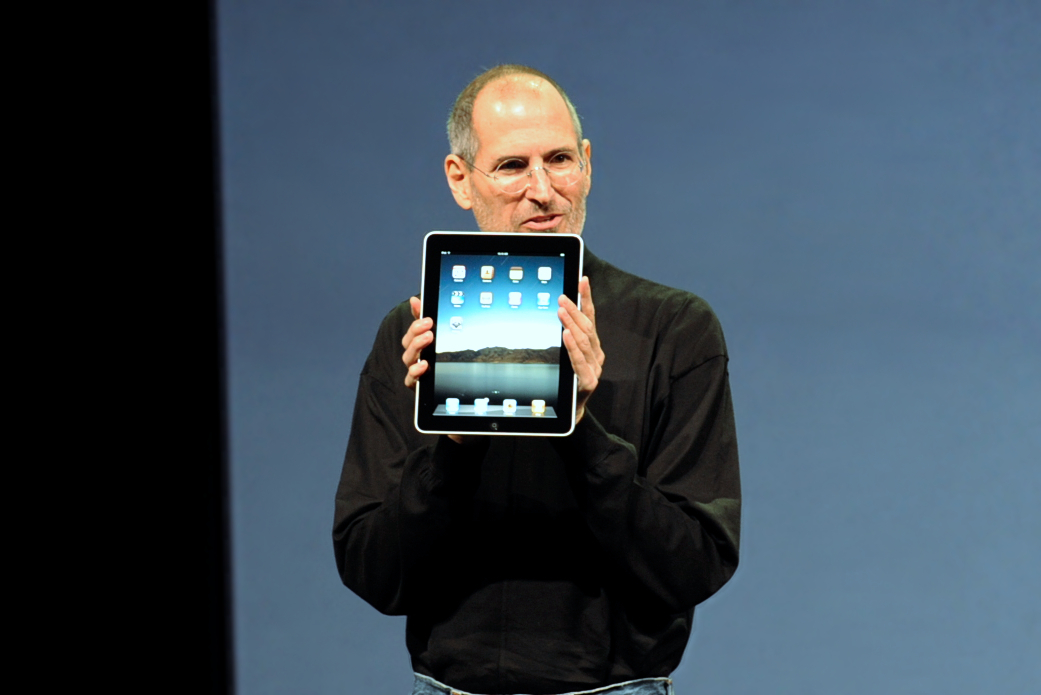
Steve Jobs introducing the iPad in San Francisco on January 27, 2010

Android was the first of the 2000s-era dominating platforms for tablet computers to reach the market. In 2008, the first plans for Android-based tablets appeared. The first products were released in 2009. Among them was the Archos 5, a pocket-sized model with a 5-inch touchscreen, that was first released with a proprietary operating system and later (in 2009) released with Android 1.4. The Camangi WebStation was released in Q2 2009. The first LTE Android tablet appeared late 2009 and was made by ICD for Verizon. This unit was called the Ultra, but a version called Vega was released around the same time. Ultra had a 7-inch display while Vega's was 15 inches. Many more products followed in 2010. Several manufacturers waited for Android Honeycomb, specifically adapted for use with tablets, which debuted in February 2011.

Apple is often credited for defining a new class of consumer device with the iPad, which shaped the commercial market for tablets in the following years, and was the most successful tablet at the time of its release. Its debut in 2010 pushed tablets into the mainstream. Samsung's Galaxy Tab and others followed, continuing the trends towards the features listed above. iPads and competing devices were tested by the U.S. military in 2011 and cleared for secure use in 2013. The top-selling line of devices was Apple's iPad with 100 million sold between its release in April 2010 and mid-October 2012, but iPad market share (number of units) dropped to 36% in 2013 with Android tablets climbing to 62%. Android tablet sales volume was 121 million devices, plus 52 million, between 2012 and 2013 respectively. Individual brands of Android operating system devices or compatibles follow iPad with Amazon's Kindle Fire with 7 million, and Barnes & Noble's Nook with 5 million.

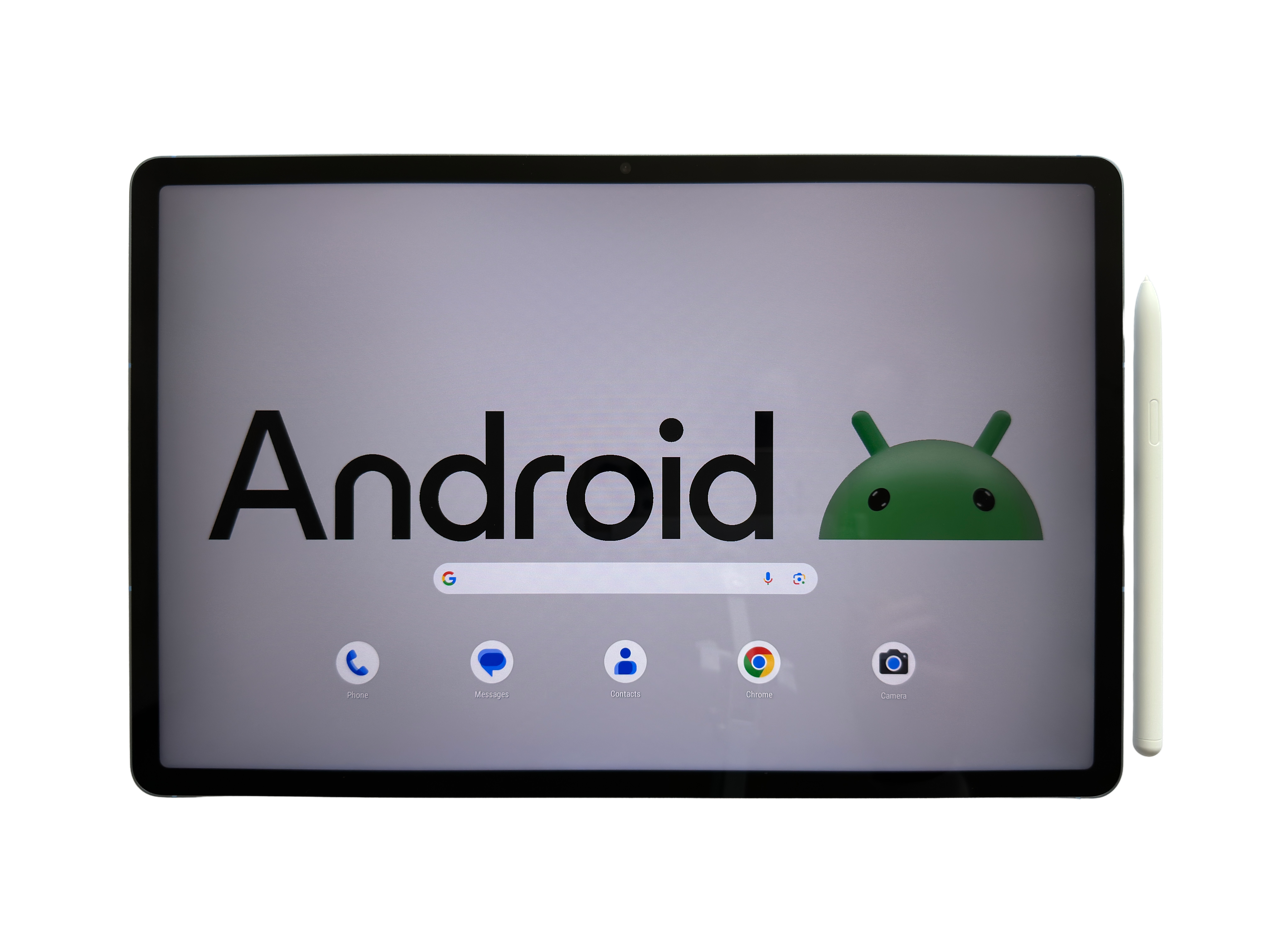
Samsung's Galaxy Tab tablet running Android

The BlackBerry PlayBook was announced in September 2010 that ran the BlackBerry Tablet OS. The BlackBerry PlayBook was officially released to US and Canadian consumers on April 19, 2011. Hewlett-Packard announced that the TouchPad, running WebOS 3.0 on a 1.2 GHz Qualcomm Snapdragon CPU, would be released in June 2011. On August 18, 2011, HP announced the discontinuation of the TouchPad, due to sluggish sales. In 2013, the Mozilla Foundation announced a prototype tablet model with Foxconn which ran on Firefox OS. Firefox OS was discontinued in 2016. The Canonical hinted that Ubuntu would be available on tablets by 2014. In February 2016, there was a commercial release of the BQ Aquaris Ubuntu tablet using the Ubuntu Touch operating system. Canonical terminated support for the project due to lack of market interest on April 5, 2017 and it was then adopted by the UBports as a community project.

As of February 2014, 83% of mobile app developers were targeting tablets, but 93% of developers were targeting smartphones. By 2014, around 23% of B2B companies were said to have deployed tablets for sales-related activities, according to a survey report by Corporate Visions. The iPad held majority use in North America, Western Europe, Japan, Australia, and most of the Americas. Android tablets were more popular in most of Asia (China and Russia an exception), Africa and Eastern Europe. In 2015 tablet sales did not increase. Apple remained the largest seller but its market share declined below 25%. Samsung vice president Gary Riding said early in 2016 that tablets were only doing well among those using them for work. Newer models were more expensive and designed for a keyboard and stylus, which reflected the changing uses. As of early 2016, Android reigned over the market with 65%. Apple took the number 2 spot with 26%, and Windows took a distant third with the remaining 9%. In 2018, out of 4.4 billion computing devices Android accounted for 2 billion, iOS for 1 billion, and the remainder were PCs, in various forms (desktop, notebook, or tablet), running various operating systems (Windows, macOS, ChromeOS, Linux, etc.).

== Types ==
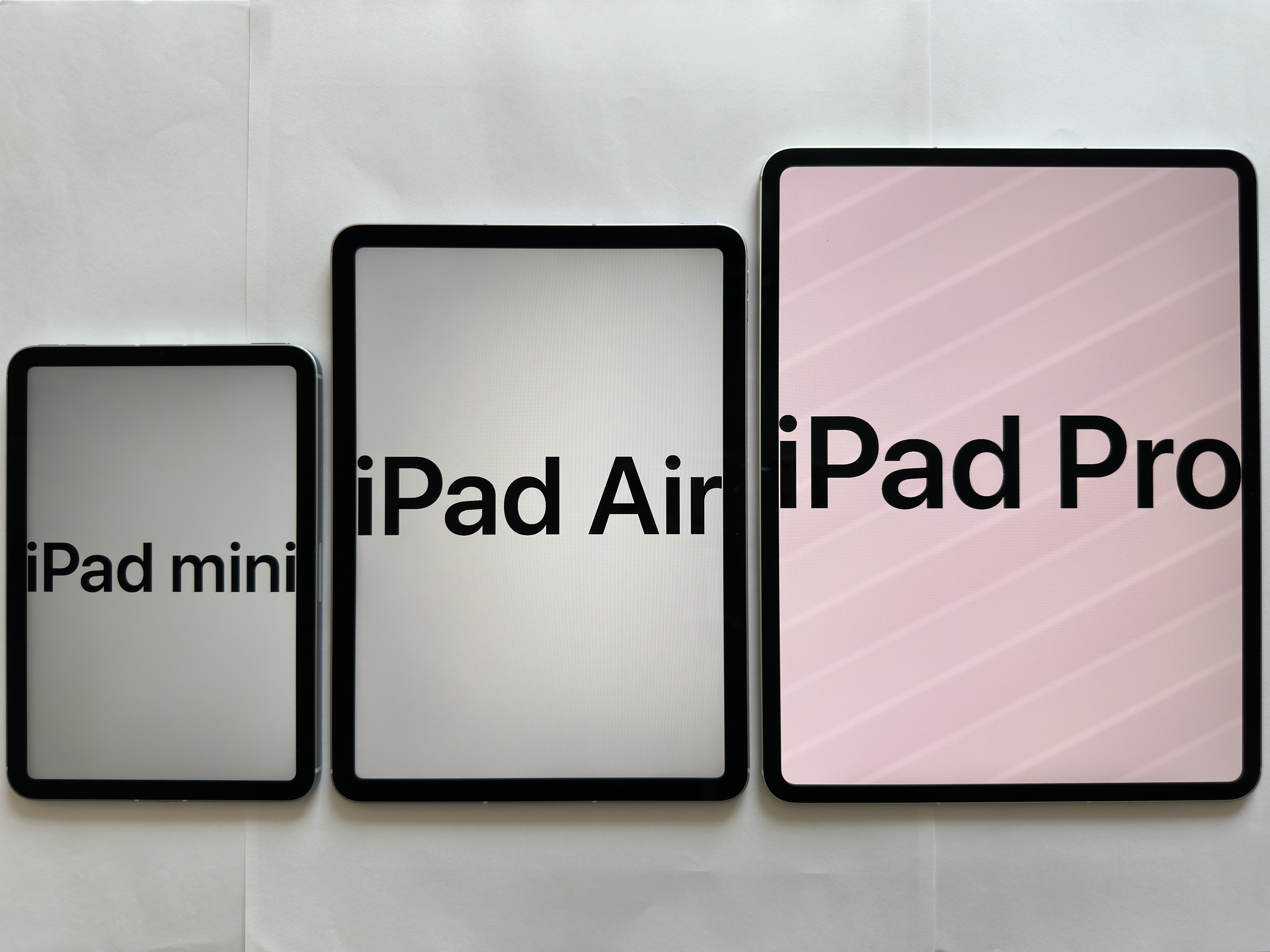
iPad mini, iPad Air, iPad Pro

Tablet computers can be loosely grouped into several categories by physical size, kind of operating system installed, input and output technology, and uses.

The size of a tablet varies, but it starts from 6 inches (150 mm).

=== Slate ===
Some models in the larger than 10-inch (25 cm) category include the Samsung Galaxy Tab Pro 12.2 at 12.2 inches (31 cm), the Toshiba Excite at 13.3 inches (33 cm) and the Dell XPS 18 at 18.4 inches (47 cm). As of March 2013, the thinnest tablet on the market was the Sony Xperia Tablet Z at only 0.27 inches (6.9 mm) thick. On September 9, 2015, Apple released the iPad Pro with a 12.9 inches (33 cm) screen size, larger than the regular iPad.

=== Mini tablet ===
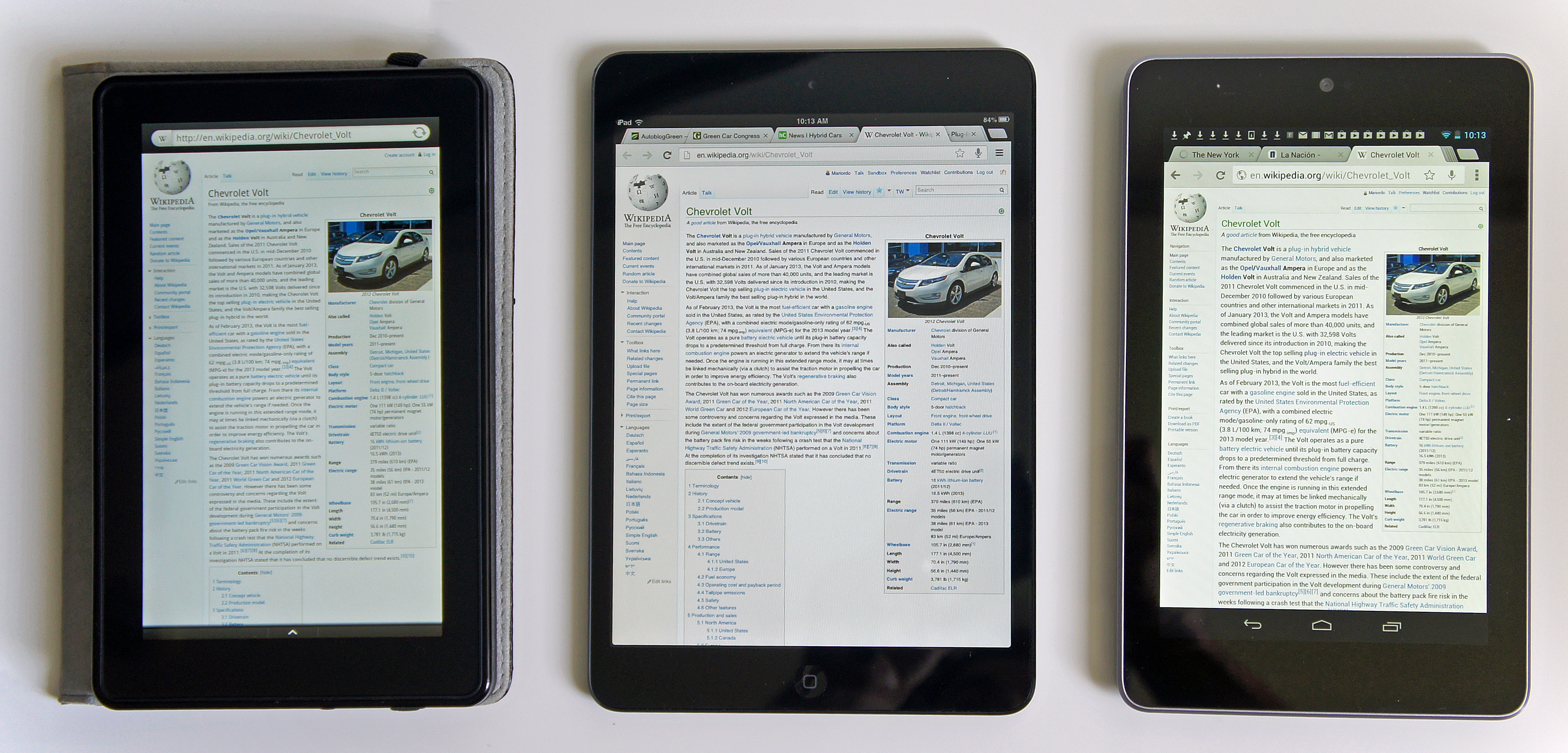
Comparison of several mini tablet computers: Amazon Kindle Fire (left), iPad Mini (center), and Google Nexus 7 (right)

Mini tablets are smaller and weigh less than slates, with typical screen sizes between 7–8 inches (18–20 cm). The first commercially successful mini tablets were introduced by Amazon.com (Kindle Fire), Barnes & Noble (Nook Tablet), and Samsung (Galaxy Tab) in 2011; and by Google (Nexus 7) in 2012. They operate identically to ordinary tablets but have lower specifications compared to them.

On September 14, 2012, Amazon, Inc. released an upgraded version of the Kindle Fire, the Kindle Fire HD, with higher screen resolution and more features compared to its predecessor, yet remaining only 7 inches. In October 2012, Apple released the iPad Mini with a 7.9-inch screen size, about 2 inches smaller than the regular iPad, but less powerful than the then current iPad 3.

On July 24, 2013, Google released an upgraded version of the Nexus 7, with FHD display, dual cameras, stereo speakers, more color accuracy, performance improvement, built-in wireless charging, and a variant with 4G LTE support for AT&T, T-Mobile, and Verizon. In September 2013, Amazon further updated the Fire tablet with the Kindle Fire HDX. In November 2013, Apple released the iPad Mini 2, which remained at 7.9 inches and nearly matched the hardware of the iPad Air.

=== Phablet ===
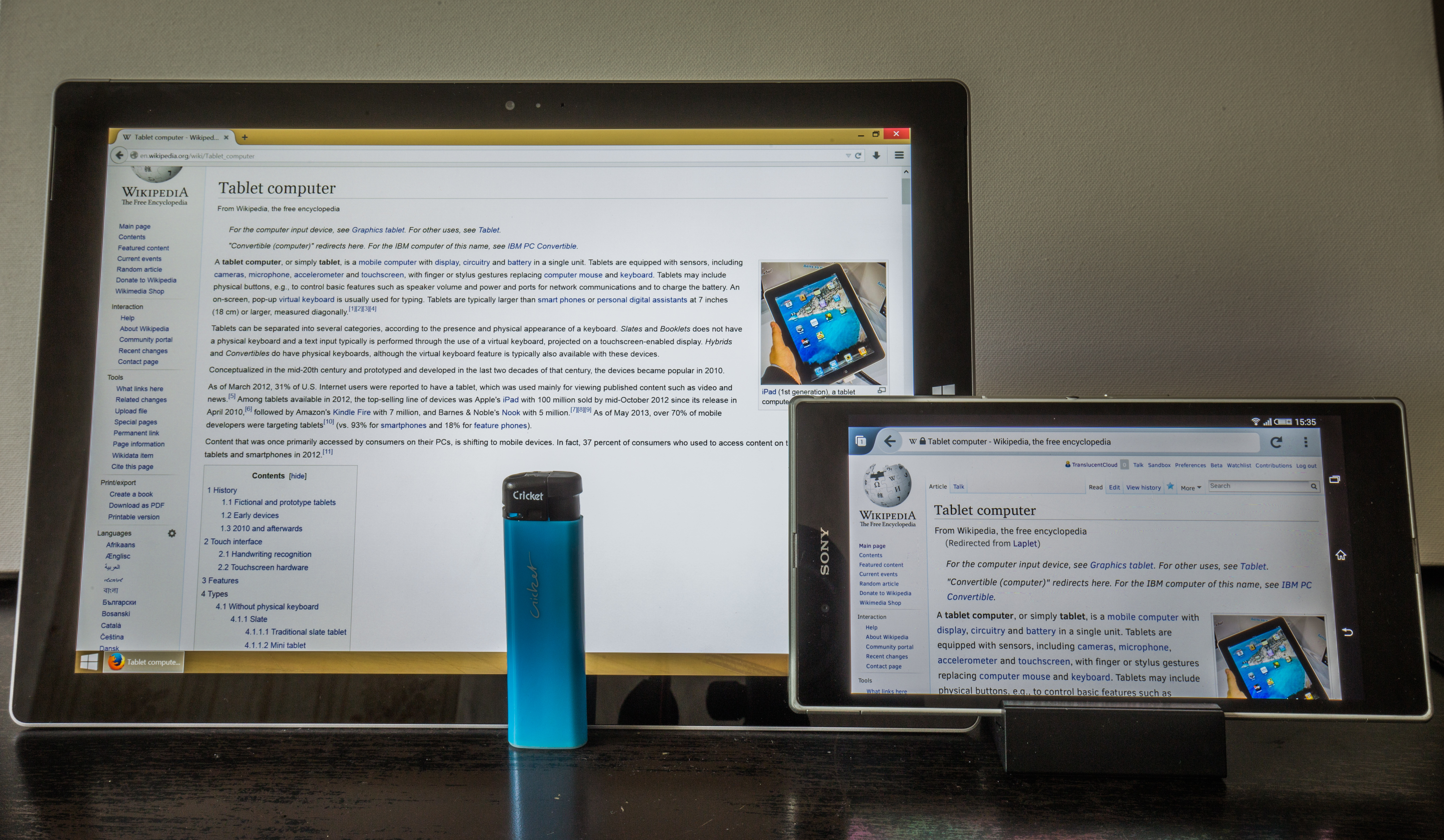
Crossover tablet device types from 2014: Microsoft Surface Pro 3 2-in-1 PC and Sony Xperia Z Ultra phablet, next to a generic blue lighter for size comparison

Smartphones and tablets are similar devices, differentiated by the former typically having smaller screens and most tablets lacking cellular network capability. Since 2010, crossover touchscreen smartphones with screens larger than 5 inches have been released. That size is generally considered larger than a traditional smartphone, creating the hybrid category of the phablet by Forbes and other publications. "Phablet" is a portmanteau of "phone" and "tablet".

At the time of the introduction of the first phablets, they had screens of 5.3 to 5.5 inches, but as of 2017 screen sizes up to 5.5 inches are considered typical. Examples of phablets from 2017 and onward are the Samsung Galaxy Note series (newer models of 5.7 inches), the LG V10/V20 (5.7 inches), the Sony Xperia XA Ultra (6 inches), the Huawei Mate 9 (5.9 inches), and the Huawei Honor (MediaPad) X2 (7 inches).

By the late 2010s, the term had largely fallen into disuse, especially as phone sizes grew, in some cases to the size of a small tablet, up to 180 mm (7.1 in), with wider aspect ratios.

=== Foldable phone ===
The iPhone Duo launching at Apple Store TRX

Since the early 2020s, companies like Samsung, Google, Motorola, Oppo and Vivo have used foldable technology to create smartphones that unfold into small tablets, including Samsung's Galaxy Z Fold and Google's Pixel Fold lineups. In 2026, Apple launched the iPhone Duo that unfolds into a small iPad with Apple Pencil support.

=== Booklet ===
Booklets are dual-touchscreen tablet computers with a clamshell design that can fold like a laptop. Examples include the Microsoft Courier, which was discontinued in 2010, the Sony Tablet P (considered a flop), and the Toshiba Libretto W100. In addition, companies like Asus and Lenovo created large 12 and 17-inch class tablets which can fold into a smaller footprint for use as a laptop.

=== 2-in-1 laptop ===
Microsoft's Surface Pro 11 running Windows 11, an example of a detachable laptop.

A 2-in-1 laptop is a hybrid or combination of a tablet and laptop computers that has features of both, an example of technological convergence. All 2-in-1 laptops have physical keyboards, but they can be either detached from the chassis ("detachable") or concealed by folding them back and under the touchscreen ("convertible"). They can also display a virtual keyboard on their touchscreens when their physical keyboards are concealed or detached.

Some 2-in-1s have processors and operating systems like those of laptops, such as Windows, while having the flexibility of operation as a tablet. Further, 2-in-1s may have typical laptop I/O ports, such as USB 3 and DisplayPort, and may connect to traditional peripheral devices and external displays. Simple tablets are mainly used as media consumption devices, while 2-in-1s have capacity for both media consumption and content creation.

There are two species of 2-in-1 laptops:

- Convertibles have a chassis design by which their physical keyboard may be concealed by flipping/folding the keyboard behind the chassis. Examples include the Lenovo Yoga series, the Samsung Galaxy Book 360 series, and the HP OmniBook 7.
- Detachables have physical keyboards that may be detached from their chassis, even while the 2-in-1 is operating. Examples include the Microsoft Surface Pro series and the Lenovo Chromebook Duet.

=== Gaming tablet ===
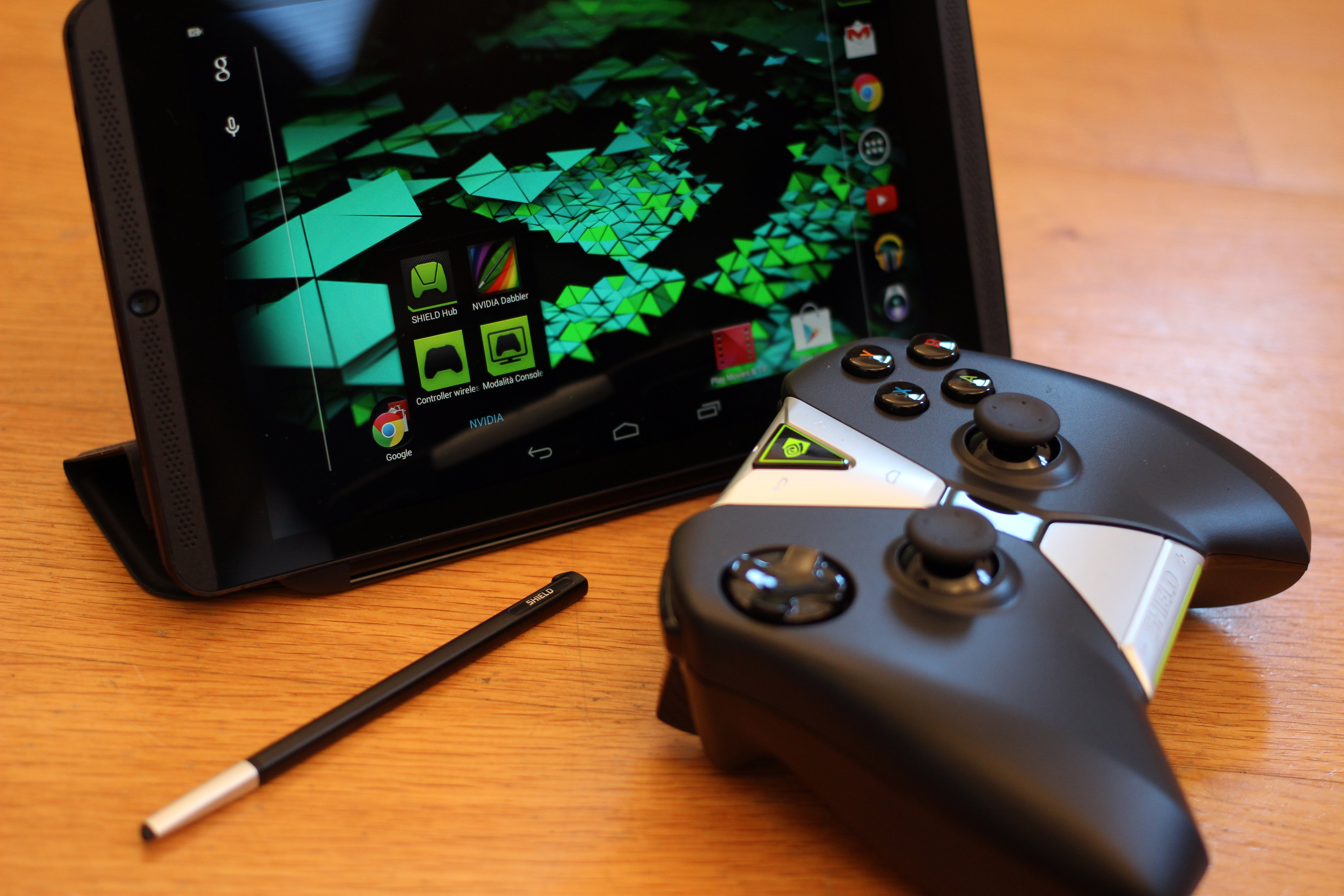
Nvidia Shield Tablet, notable gaming tablet

Some tablets are modified by adding physical gamepad buttons such as D-pad and thumb sticks for better gaming experience combined with the touchscreen and all other features of a typical tablet computer. Most of these tablets are targeted to run native OS games and emulator games. Nvidia's Shield Tablet, with an 8-inch (200 mm) display, and running Android, is an example. It runs Android games purchased from Google Play Store. PC games can also be streamed to the tablet from computers with some higher end models of Nvidia-powered video cards.

The Nintendo Switch hybrid console and its successor Nintendo Switch 2 are also gaming tablets that run on their own system software, featuring detachable Joy-Con controllers with motion controls (along with its successor Joy-Con 2 controllers to additionally consist with the mouse control, replacing the IR motion camera sensor) and three gaming modes: table-top mode using its kickstand, traditional docked/TV mode and handheld mode.

While not entirely an actual tablet form factor due to their sizes, some other handheld console including the Nintendo Switch Lite and PlayStation Vita are treated as a gaming tablet or tablet replacement by community and reviewers due to their capabilities on browsing the internet and multimedia capabilities.

=== Customized business tablet ===
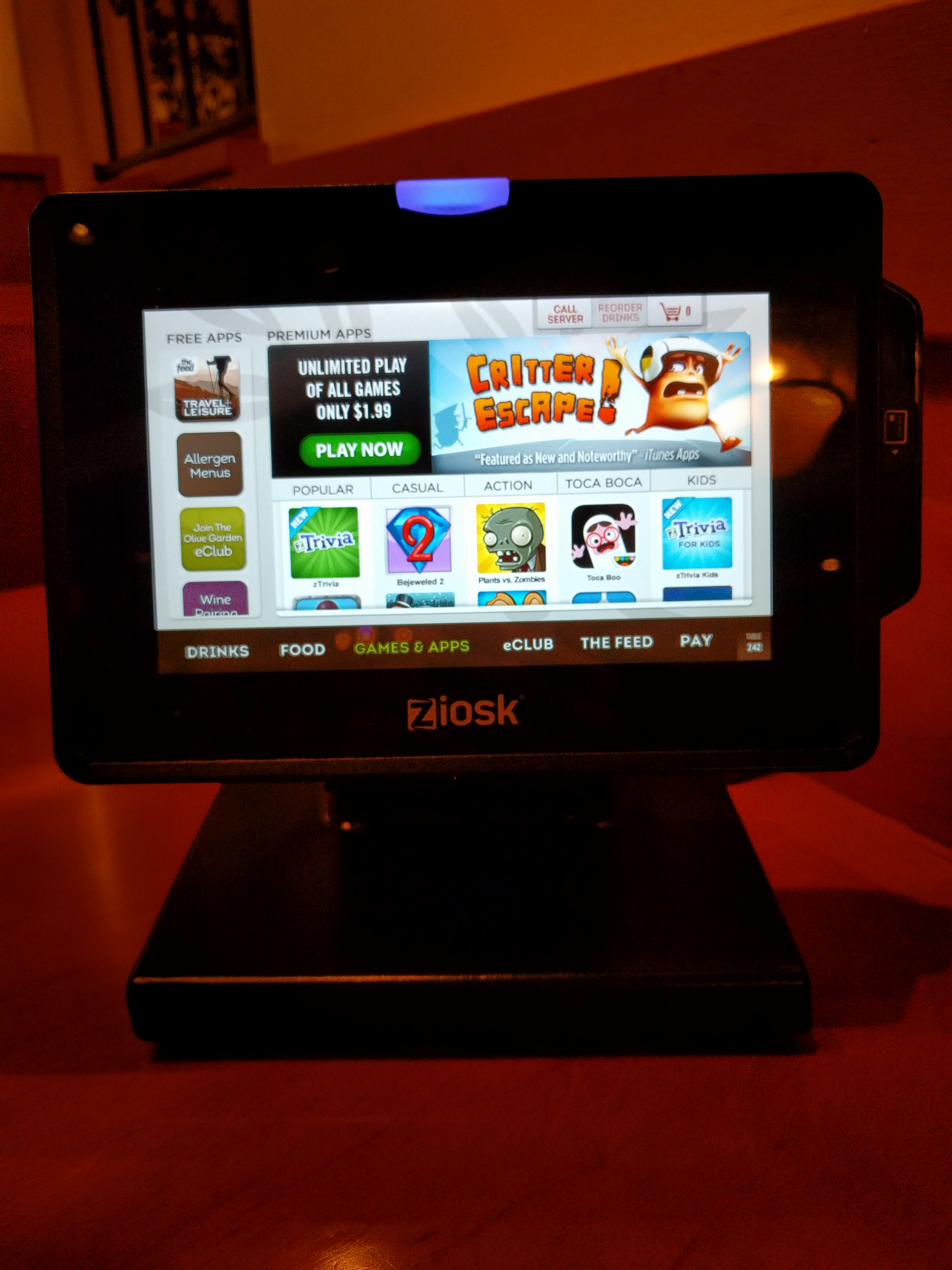
Games on a Ziosk table ordering tablet at an Olive Garden restaurant

Customized business tablets are built specifically for a business customer's particular needs from a hardware and software perspective, and delivered in a business-to-business transaction. For example, in hardware, a transportation company may find that the consumer-grade GPS module in an off-the-shelf tablet provides insufficient accuracy, so a tablet can be customized and embedded with a professional-grade antenna to provide a better GPS signal. Such tablets may also be ruggedized for field use. For a software example, the same transportation company might remove certain software functions in the Android system, such as the web browser, to reduce costs from needless cellular network data consumption of an employee, and add custom package management software. Other applications may call for a resistive touchscreen and other special hardware and software.

A table ordering tablet is a touchscreen tablet computer designed for use in casual restaurants. Such devices allow users to order food and drinks, play games and pay their bill. Since 2013, restaurant chains including Chili's, Olive Garden and Red Robin have adopted them. As of 2014, the two most popular brands were Ziosk and Presto. The devices have been criticized by servers who claim that some restaurants determine their hours based on customer feedback in areas unrelated to service.

=== E-reader ===
Any device that can display text on a screen may act as an E-reader. While traditionally E-readers are designed primarily for the purpose of reading digital e-books and periodicals, modern E-readers that use a mobile operating system such as Android have incorporated modern functionally including internet browsing and multimedia capabilities; for example the Huawei MatePad Paper is a tablet that uses e-ink instead of a typical LCD or LED panel, hence focusing on the reading of digital content while maintaining the internet and multimedia capabilities. Some E-readers such as the PocketBook InkPad Color and the Onyx Boox Nova 3 Color even came with a color e-ink panel and speaker which allowed for a higher degree of multimedia consumption and video playback.

The Amazon Kindle devices were originally limited to e-reading capabilities; however, an update to their Kindle firmware added the ability to browse the Internet and play audio, allowing them to be alternatives to a traditional tablet, in some cases, with a more readable e-ink panel and greater battery life, and providing the user with access to wider multimedia capabilities compared to the older models.

== Hardware ==
=== System architecture ===
ARM has been the choice for tablet manufacturers, and most tablets released since mid-2010 use a version of an ARM processor for longer battery life. The ARM Cortex family is powerful enough for tasks such as internet browsing, light creative and production work and mobile games.

This ARM dominance began with the release of the mobile-focused and comparatively power-efficient 32-bit ARM610 processor originally designed for the Apple Newton in 1993 and ARM3-using Acorn A4 laptop in 1992. Arm Holding's licensing model supported this success by allowing device manufacturers to license, alter and fabricate custom SoC derivatives tailored to their own products. This has helped manufacturers extend battery life and shrink component count along with the size of devices.

The multiple licensees ensured that multiple fabricators could supply near-identical products, while encouraging price competition. This forced unit prices down to a fraction of their x86 equivalents. The architecture has historically had limited support from Microsoft, but with the 2012 release of Windows 8, Microsoft announced added support for the architecture, shipping their own ARM-based tablet computer, branded the Microsoft Surface, as well as an x86-64 Intel Core i5 variant branded as Microsoft Surface Pro.

Intel tablet chip sales were 1 million units in 2012, and 12 million units in 2013. Intel chairman Andy Bryant has stated that its 2014 goal is to quadruple its tablet chip sales to 40 million units by the end of that year, as an investment for 2015.

=== Display ===
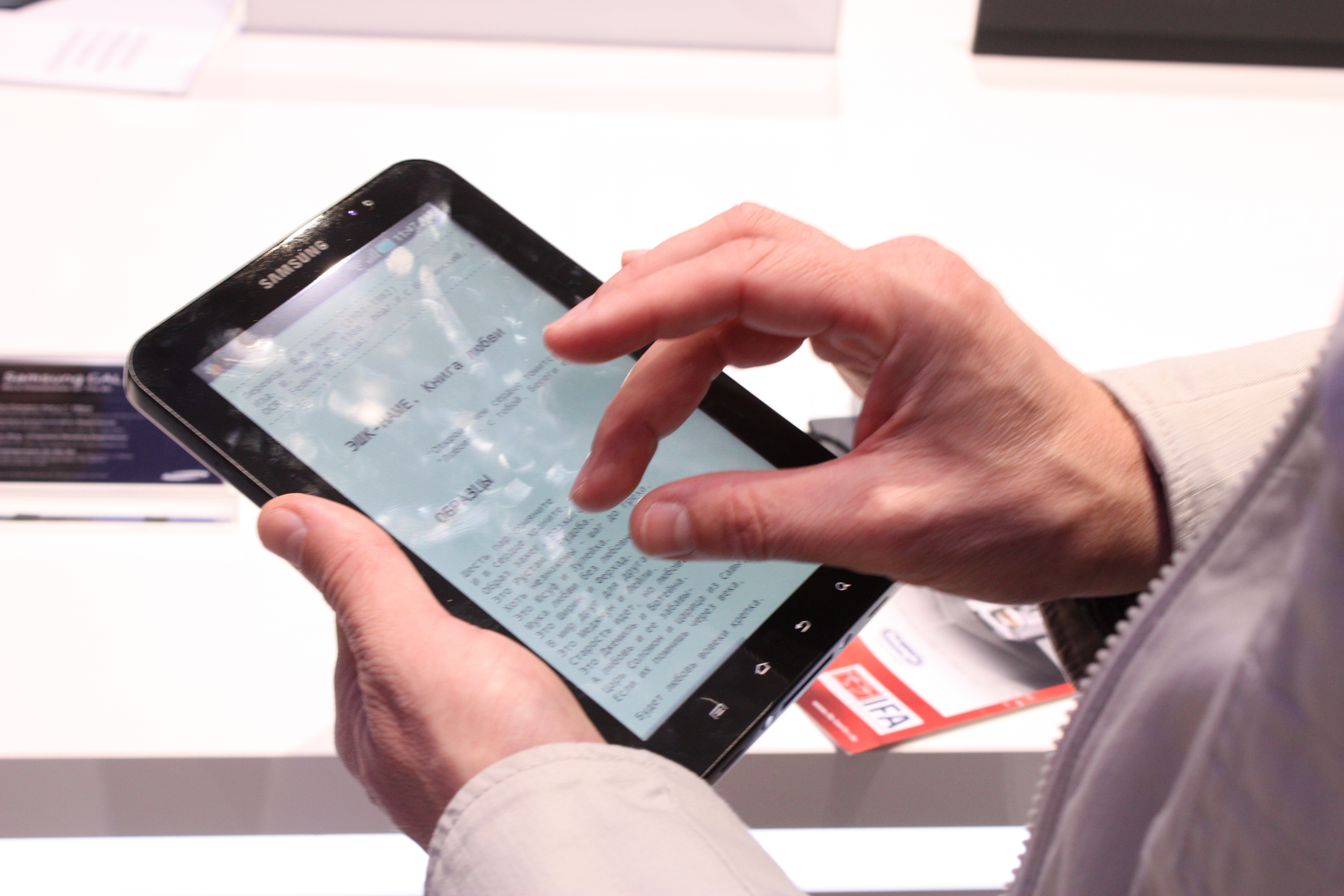
Samsung Galaxy Tab demonstrating multi-touch

A key component among tablet computers is touch input on a touchscreen display. This allows the user to navigate easily and type with a virtual keyboard on the screen or press other icons on the screen to open apps or files. The first tablet to do this was the Linus Write-Top by Linus Technologies; the tablet featured both a stylus, a pen-like tool to aid with precision in a touchscreen device, as well as handwriting recognition. The system must respond to on-screen touches rather than clicks of a keyboard or mouse. This operation makes precise use of our eye–hand coordination.

Touchscreens usually come in one of two forms:

- Resistive touchscreens are passive and respond to pressure on the screen. They allow a high level of precision, useful in emulating a pointer (as is common in tablet computers) but may require calibration. Because of the high resolution, a stylus or fingernail is often used. Stylus-oriented systems are less suited to multi-touch.
- Capacitive touchscreens tend to be less accurate, but more responsive than resistive devices. Because they require a conductive material, such as a fingertip, for input, they are not common among stylus-oriented devices but are prominent on consumer devices. Most finger-driven capacitive screens do not currently support pressure input (except for the iPhone 6S and later models), but some tablets use a pressure-sensitive stylus or active pen.
- Some tablets can recognize individual palms, while some professional-grade tablets use pressure-sensitive films, such as those on graphics tablets. Some capacitive touch-screens can detect the size of the touched area and the pressure used.

Since mid-2010s, most tablets use capacitive touchscreens with multi-touch, unlike earlier resistive touchscreen devices which users needed styluses to perform inputs.

There are also electronic paper tablets such as Sony Digital Paper DPTS1 and reMarkable that use E ink for its display technology.

=== Handwriting recognition ===
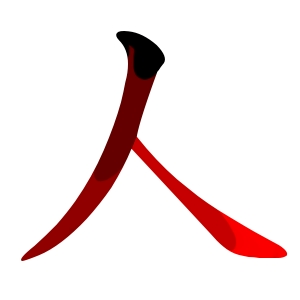
Chinese characters like this one meaning "person" can be written by handwriting recognition (Mandarin: rén, Korean: in, Japanese: jin, nin; hito, Cantonese: jan4). The character has two strokes, the first shown here in brown, and the second in red. The black area represents the starting position of the writing instrument.

Many tablets support a stylus and support handwriting recognition. Wacom and N-trig digital pens provide approximately 2500 DPI resolution for handwriting, exceeding the resolution of capacitive touch screens by more than a factor of 10. These pens also support pressure sensitivity, allowing for "variable-width stroke-based" characters, such as Chinese/Japanese/Korean writing, due to their built-in capability of "pressure sensing". Pressure is also used in digital art applications such as Autodesk Sketchbook. Apps exist on both iOS and Android platforms for handwriting recognition and in 2015 Google introduced its own handwriting input with support for 82 languages.

=== Other features ===
After 2007, with access to capacitive screens and the success of the iPhone, other features became common, such as multi-touch features (in which the user can touch the screen in multiple places to trigger actions) and other natural user interface features, as well as flash memory solid state storage and "instant on" warm-booting; external USB and Bluetooth keyboards defined tablets.

Other features are: High-definition, anti-glare display, touchscreen, lower weight and longer battery life than a comparably-sized laptop, wireless local area and internet connectivity (usually with Wi-Fi standard and optional mobile broadband), Bluetooth for connecting peripherals and communicating with local devices, ports for wired connections and charging, for example USB ports, Early devices had IR support and could work as a TV remote controller, docking station, keyboard and added connectivity, on-board flash memory, ports for removable storage, various cloud storage services for backup and syncing data across devices, local storage on a local area network (LAN).

- Speech recognition Google introduced voice input in Android 2.1 in 2009 and voice actions in 2.2 in 2010, with up to five languages (now around 40). Siri was introduced as a system-wide personal assistant on the iPhone 4S in 2011 and now supports nearly 20 languages. In both cases, the voice input is sent to central servers to perform general speech recognition and thus requires a network connection for more than simple commands.
- Near-field communication with other compatible devices including ISO/IEC 14443 RFID tags.

== Software ==
=== Operating systems ===
Tablets typically use a mobile operating system, although desktop-class operating systems have also been used. Desktop OS-based tablets are currently thicker and heavier. They require more storage and more cooling and give less battery life. They can run processor-intensive graphical applications in addition to mobile apps, and have more ports.

Mobile-based tablets are the reverse, and run only mobile apps. They can use battery life conservatively because the processor is significantly smaller. This allows the battery to last much longer than the common laptop.

In Q1 2018, Android tablets had 62% of the market, Apple's iOS had 23.4% of the market and Windows 10 had 14.6% of the market. In late 2021, iOS has 55% use worldwide (varies by continent, e.g. below 50% in South America and Africa) and Android 45% use. Still, Android tablets have more use than iOS in virtually all countries, except for e.g. the U.S. and China.

==== Android ====
Android is a Linux-based operating system that Google offers as open source under the Apache license. It is designed primarily for mobile devices such as smartphones and tablet computers. Android supports low-cost ARM systems and others. The first tablets running Android were released in 2009. Vendors such as Motorola and Lenovo delayed deployment of their tablets until after 2011, when Android was reworked to include more tablet features. Android 3.0 (Honeycomb), released in 2011 and later versions support larger screen sizes, mainly tablets, and have access to the Google Play service. Android includes operating system, middleware and key applications.

A few tablet computers are shipped with Android Go, a stripped-down version of the Android operating system designed for low-end and ultra-budget smartphones.

Other vendors sell customized Android tablets, such as Amazon Fire and Nook, which are used to consume mobile content and provide their own app store, rather than using the larger Aaq system, thereby fragmenting the Android market.

==== iPadOS ====
The iPad runs on iPadOS. Prior to the introduction of iPadOS in 2019, the iPad ran iOS, which was created for the iPhone and iPod Touch. The first iPad was released in 2010. Although built on the same underlying Unix implementation as macOS, its user interface is radically different. iPadOS is designed for touch input from the user's fingers and has none of the features that required a stylus on earlier tablets. Apple introduced multi-touch gestures, such as moving two fingers apart or together to zoom in or out, also termed pinch to zoom. iPadOS and iOS are built for the ARM architecture.

==== Windows ====
Following Windows for Pen Computing for Windows 3.1 in 1991, Microsoft supported tablets running Windows XP under the Microsoft Tablet PC name. Microsoft Tablet PCs were pen-based, fully functional x86 PCs with handwriting and voice recognition functionality. Windows XP Tablet PC Edition provided pen support. Tablet support was added to both Home and Business versions of Windows Vista and Windows 7. Tablets running Windows could use the touchscreen for mouse input, hand writing recognition and gesture support. Following Tablet PC, Microsoft announced the Ultra-mobile PC initiative in 2006 which brought Windows tablets to a smaller, touch-centric form factor. In 2008, Microsoft showed a prototype of a two-screen tablet called Microsoft Courier, but cancelled the project.

In 2012, Microsoft released Windows 8, which features significant changes to various aspects of the operating system's user interface and platform which are designed for touch-based devices such as tablets. The operating system also introduced an app store (Microsoft Store) and a new style of application optimized primarily for use on tablets. Microsoft also introduced Windows RT, an edition of Windows 8 for use on ARM-based devices. The launch of Windows 8 and RT was accompanied by the release of devices with the two operating systems by various manufacturers (including Microsoft themselves, with the release of Surface), such as slate tablets, hybrids, and convertibles.

Released in July 2015, Windows 10 introduces what Microsoft described as "universal apps"; expanding on Metro-style apps, these apps can be designed to run across multiple Microsoft product families with nearly identical code‍ – ‌including PCs, tablets, smartphones, embedded systems, Xbox One, Surface Hub and Windows Holographic. The Windows user interface was revised to handle transitions between a mouse-oriented interface and a touchscreen-optimized interface based on available input devices‍ – ‌particularly on 2-in-1 PCs; both interfaces include an updated Start menu.

==== ChromeOS ====
Several devices that run ChromeOS came on the market in 2017–2019, as tablets, or as 2-in-1s with touchscreen and 360-degree hinge.

==== HarmonyOS ====
HarmonyOS (HMOS) (Chinese: 鸿蒙; pinyin: Hóngméng) is a distributed operating system developed by Huawei to collaborate and interconnect with multiple smart devices on the Internet of Things (IoT) ecosystem. In its current multi-kernel design, the operating system selects suitable kernels from the abstraction layer for devices with diverse resources. For IoT devices, the system is known to be based on LiteOS kernel; while for smartphones and tablets, it is based on a Linux kernel layer with AOSP libraries to support Android application package (APK) apps using Android Runtime (ART) through the Ark Compiler, in addition to native HarmonyOS apps built via integrated development environment (IDE) known as DevEco Studio.

==== Kindle firmware ====
Kindle firmware is a mobile operating system specifically designed for Amazon Kindle e-readers. It is based on a custom Linux kernel; however, it is entirely closed-source and proprietary, and only runs on Amazon Kindle line up manufactured under the Amazon brand.

==== Nintendo Switch system software ====
The Nintendo Switch system software (also known by its codename Horizon) is an updatable firmware and operating system used by the Nintendo Switch hybrid video game console/tablet and Nintendo Switch Lite handheld game console. It is based on a proprietary microkernel. The UI includes a HOME screen, consisting of the top bar, the screenshot viewer ("Album"), and shortcuts to the Nintendo eShop, News, and Settings.

==== PlayStation Vita system software ====
The PlayStation Vita system software is the official firmware and operating system for the PlayStation Vita and PlayStation TV video game consoles. It uses the LiveArea as its graphical shell. The PlayStation Vita system software has one optional add-on component, the PlayStation Mobile Runtime Package. The system is built on a Unix-base which is derived from FreeBSD and NetBSD. Due to it capabilities on browsing the internet and multimedia capabilities, it is treat as an gaming tablet or tablet replacement by community and reviewer/publisher.

==== Ubuntu Touch ====
Ubuntu Touch is an open-source (GPL) mobile version of the Ubuntu operating system originally developed in 2013 by Canonical Ltd. and continued by the non-profit UBports Foundation in 2017. Ubuntu Touch can run on a pure GNU/Linux base on phones with the required drivers, such as the Librem 5 and the PinePhone. To enable hardware that was originally shipped with Android, Ubuntu Touch makes use of the Android Linux kernel, using Android drivers and services via an LXC container, but does not use any of the Java-like code of Android. As of February 2022, Ubuntu Touch is available on 78 phones and tablets. The UBports Installer serves as an easy-to-use tool to allow inexperienced users to install the operating system on third-party devices without damaging their hardware.

==== Hybrid OS operation ====
Several hardware companies have built hybrid devices with the possibility to work with both Android and Windows Phone operating systems (or in rare cases Windows 8.1, as with the, by now cancelled, Asus Transformer Book Duet), while Ars Technica stated: "dual-OS devices are always terrible products. Windows and Android almost never cross-communicate, so any dual-OS device means dealing with separate apps, data, and storage pools and completely different UI paradigms. So from a consumer perspective, Microsoft and Google are really just saving OEMs from producing tons of clunky devices that no one will want."

=== Discontinued tablet operating systems ===
==== BlackBerry 10 ====
BlackBerry 10 (based on the QNX OS) is from BlackBerry. As a smartphone OS, it is closed-source and proprietary, and only runs on phones and tablets manufactured by BlackBerry.

One of the dominant platforms in the world in the late 2000s, its global market share was reduced significantly by the mid-2010s. In late 2016, BlackBerry announced that it will continue to support the OS, with a promise to release 10.3.3. Therefore, BlackBerry 10 would not receive any major updates as BlackBerry and its partners would focus more on their Android base development.

==== BlackBerry Tablet OS ====
BlackBerry Tablet OS is an operating system from BlackBerry Ltd based on the QNX Neutrino real-time operating system designed to run Adobe AIR and BlackBerry WebWorks applications, currently available for the BlackBerry PlayBook tablet computer. The BlackBerry Tablet OS is the first tablet running an operating system from QNX (now a subsidiary of RIM).

BlackBerry Tablet OS supports standard BlackBerry Java applications. Support for Android apps has also been announced, through sandbox "app players" which can be ported by developers or installed through sideloading by users. A BlackBerry Tablet OS Native Development Kit, to develop native applications with the GNU toolchain is currently in closed beta testing. The first device to run BlackBerry Tablet OS was the BlackBerry PlayBook tablet computer.

=== App store ===
Apps that do not come pre-installed with the system are supplied through online distribution. These sources, termed app stores, provide centralized catalogs of software and allow "one click" on-device software purchasing, installation and updates.

Mobile device suppliers may adopt a "walled garden" approach, wherein the supplier controls what software applications ("apps") are available. Software development kits are restricted to approved software developers. This can be used to reduce the impact of malware, provide software with an approved content rating, control application quality and exclude competing vendors. Apple, Google, Amazon, Microsoft and Barnes & Noble all adopted the strategy. B&N originally allowed arbitrary apps to be installed, but, in December 2011, excluded third parties. Apple and IBM have agreed to cooperate in cross-selling IBM-developed applications for iPads and iPhones in enterprise-level accounts. Proponents of open source software say that the iPad (or such "walled garden" app store approach) violates the spirit of personal control that traditional personal computers have always provided.

== Sales ==
Around 2010, tablet use by businesses jumped, as business began to use them for conferences, events, and trade shows. In 2012, Intel reported that their tablet program improved productivity for about 19,000 of their employees by an average of 57 minutes a day. In October 2012, display screen shipments for tablets began surpassing shipments for laptop display screens. Tablets became increasingly used in the construction industry to look at blueprints, field documentation and other relevant information on the device instead of carrying around large amounts of paper. Time described the product's popularity as a "global tablet craze" in a November 2012 article.

As of the start of 2014, 44% of US online consumers owned tablets, a significant jump from 5% in 2011. Tablet use also became increasingly common among children. A 2014 survey found that mobiles were the most frequently used object for play among American children under the age of 12. Mobiles were used more often in play than video game consoles, board games, puzzles, play vehicles, blocks and dolls/action figures. Despite this, the majority of parents said that a mobile was "never" or only "sometimes" a toy. As of 2014, nearly two-thirds of American 2- to 10-year-olds have access to a tablet or e-reader. The large use of tablets by adults is as a personal internet-connected TV. A 2015 study found that a third of children under five have their own tablet device.

After a fast rise in sales during the early 2010s, the tablet market had plateaued in 2015 and by Q3 2018 sales had declined by 35% from its Q3 2014 peak. In spite of this, tablet sales worldwide had surpassed sales of desktop computers in 2017, and worldwide PC sales were flat for the first quarter of 2018. In 2020 the tablet market saw a large surge in sales with 164 million tablet units being shipped worldwide due to a large demand for work from home and online learning.

Unit sales or shipments of global tablet market 2010–2019 (Figures from 2010 to 2014 are sales estimates provided by Gartner; figures from 2014 to 2019 are shipments estimates provided by IDC)
	2010	2011	2012	2013	2014	2015	2016	2017	2018	2019
Units (M)	17.6	60.0	116.3	195.4	216.0 (sales); 229.6 (shipments)	207.2	174.8	163.5	146.2	144.1
Growth (pct.)	N/A	240.9	93.8	68.0	10.5 (sales) 4.4 (shipments)	−10.1	−15.6	−6.5	−11.4	−1.5

Unit shipments of global tablet market 2020–present (Figures until 2023 are provided by IDC; figures for 2024 are provided by Canalys)
	2020	2021	2022	2023	2024
Units (M)	164.1	168.8	162.8	128.5	147.6
Growth (pct.)	13.6	3.2	−3.3	−20.5	9.0

=== By manufacturer ===
Global tablet market share by unit shipments, percent (2011–2019)
Rank	Q3 2011		Q3 2012		Q3 2013		Q3 2014		Q3 2015		Q3 2016		Q3 2017		Q3 2018		Q3 2019	
1	Apple	61.5	Apple	50.4	Apple	29.6	Apple	22.8	Apple	20.3	Apple	21.5	Apple	25.8	Apple	26.6	Apple	31.4
2	Samsung	5.6	Samsung	18.4	Samsung	20.4	Samsung	18.3	Samsung	16.5	Samsung	15.1	Samsung	15.0	Samsung	14.6	Amazon	14.5
3	HP	5.0	Amazon	9.0	Asus	7.4	Asus	6.5	Lenovo	6.3	Amazon	7.3	Amazon	10.9	Amazon	12.0	Samsung	12.3
4	Barnes & Noble	4.5	Asus	8.6	Lenovo	4.8	Lenovo	5.7	Asus	4.0	Lenovo	6.3	Huawei	7.5	Huawei	8.9	Huawei	9.5
5	Asus	4.0	Lenovo	1.4	Acer	2.5	RCA	6.9	Huawei	3.7	Huawei	5.6	Lenovo	7.4	Lenovo	6.3	Lenovo	6.7
Others				12.2		35.3		41.8		49.1		44.2		33.3		31.6		25.5

Global tablet market share by unit shipments, percent (2020–present)
Rank	Q3 2020		Q3 2021		Q3 2022		Q3 2023		Q3 2024	
1	Apple	29.2	Apple	34.6	Apple	37.5	Apple	37.5	Apple	31.7
2	Samsung	19.8	Samsung	17.7	Samsung	18.4	Samsung	18.0	Samsung	17.9
3	Amazon	11.4	Amazon	11.1	Amazon	11.1	Lenovo	7.9	Amazon	11.6
4	Huawei	10.2	Lenovo	10.1	Lenovo	7.0	Huawei	6.8	Huawei	8.2
5	Lenovo	8.6	Huawei	5.4	Huawei	6.2	Amazon	6.5	Lenovo	7.6
Others		20.9		21.1		19.7		23.3		22.9

=== By operating system ===
According to a survey conducted by the Online Publishers Association (OPA) now called Digital Content Next (DCN) in March 2012, it found that 72% of tablet owners had an iPad, while 32% had an Android tablet. By 2012, Android tablet adoption had increased. 52% of tablet owners owned an iPad, while 51% owned an Android-powered tablet (percentages do not add up to 100% because some tablet owners own more than one type). By end of 2013, Android's market share rose to 61.9%, followed by iOS at 36%. By late 2014, Android's market share rose to 72%, followed by iOS at 22.3% and Windows at 5.7%. As of early 2016, Android has 65% marketshare, Apple has 26% and Windows has 9% marketshare. In Q1 2018, Android tablets had 62% of the market, Apple's iOS had 23.4% of the market and Windows 10 had 14.6% of the market.

	Market share (Q3 2022)
Android	49%
iPadOS	38%
Windows	11%
Others	2%

Source: Strategy Analytics

== Use ==
=== Sleep ===
The blue wavelength of light from back-lit tablets may impact one's ability to fall asleep when reading at night, through the suppression of melatonin. Experts at Harvard Medical School suggest limiting tablets for reading use in the evening. Those who have a delayed body clock, such as teenagers, which makes them prone to stay up late in the evening and sleep later in the morning, may be at particular risk for increases in sleep deficiencies. A PC app such as F.lux and Android apps such as CF.lumen and Twilight attempt to decrease the impact on sleep by filtering blue wavelengths from the display. iOS 9.3 includes Night Shift that shifts the colors of the device's display to be warmer during the later hours.

=== By plane ===
Because of, among other things, electromagnetic waves emitted by this type of device, the use of any type of electronic device during the take-off and landing phases was totally prohibited on board commercial flights. On November 13, 2013, the European Aviation Safety Agency (EASA) announced that the use of mobile terminals could be authorized on the flights of European airlines during these phases from 2014 onwards, on the condition that the cellular functions are deactivated ("airplane" mode activated). In September 2014, EASA issued guidance that allows EU airlines to permit use of tablets, e-readers, smartphones, and other portable electronic devices to stay on without the need to be in airplane mode during all parts of EU flights; however, each airline has to decide to allow this behavior. In the U.S., the Federal Aviation Administration allowed use of portable electronic devices during all parts of flights while in airplane mode in late 2013.

=== Tourism ===
Some French historical monuments are equipped with digital tactile tablets called "HistoPad". It is an application integrated with an iPad Mini offering an interaction in augmented and virtual reality with several pieces of the visit, the visitor being able to take control of their visit in an interactive and personalized way.

=== Professional use for specific sectors ===
Some professionals – for example, in the construction industry, insurance experts, lifeguards or surveyors – use so-called rugged shelf models in the field that can withstand extreme hot or cold shocks or climatic environments. Some units are hardened against drops and screen breakage. Satellite-connectivity-equipped tablets such as the Thorium X, for example, can be used in areas where there is no other connectivity. This is a valuable feature in the aeronautical and military realms. For example, United States Army helicopter pilots are moving to tablets as electronic flight bags, which confer the advantages of rapid, convenient synchronization of large groups of users, and the seamless updating of information. US Army chaplains who are deployed in the field with the troops cite the accessibility of Army regulations, field manuals, and other critical information to help with their services; however, power generation, speakers, and a tablet rucksack are also necessary for the chaplains.

=== Prisons ===
In the United States, specialized tablets made by JPay and Global Tel Link are available in many prisons. These tablets have been criticized by the Prison Policy Initiative for exploitative microtransactions, as well as for providing an excuse to cut other programs such as prison libraries.

== See also ==
- Comparison of tablet computers
- List of tablet PC dimensions and case sizes
- Lists of mobile computers
- Mobile device
- 2-in-1 laptop
- Laptop–tablet convergence
