= Ziosk =

Restaurant-focused business-to-business software as a service company

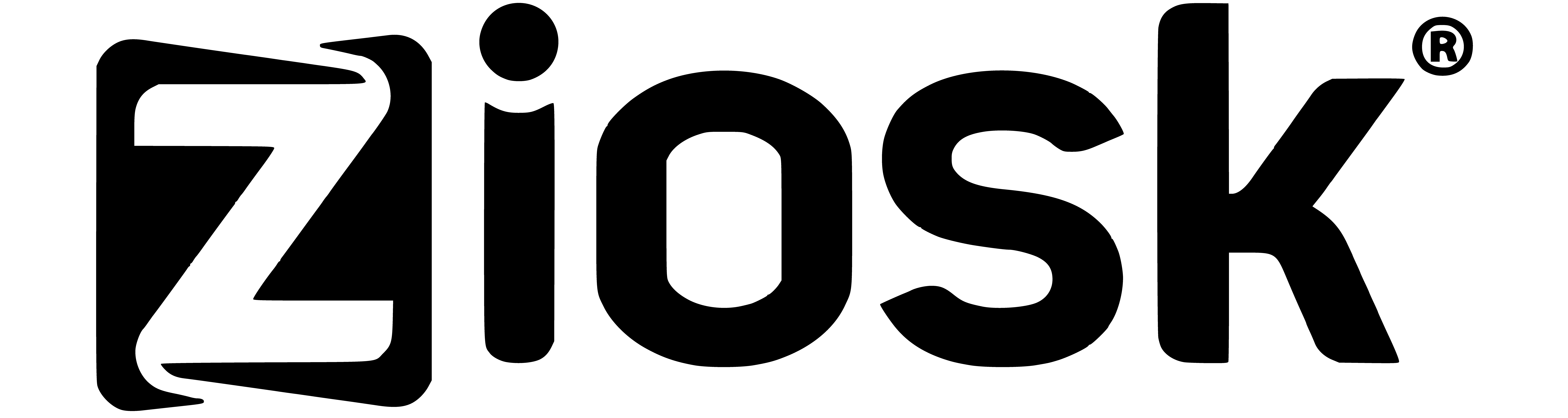

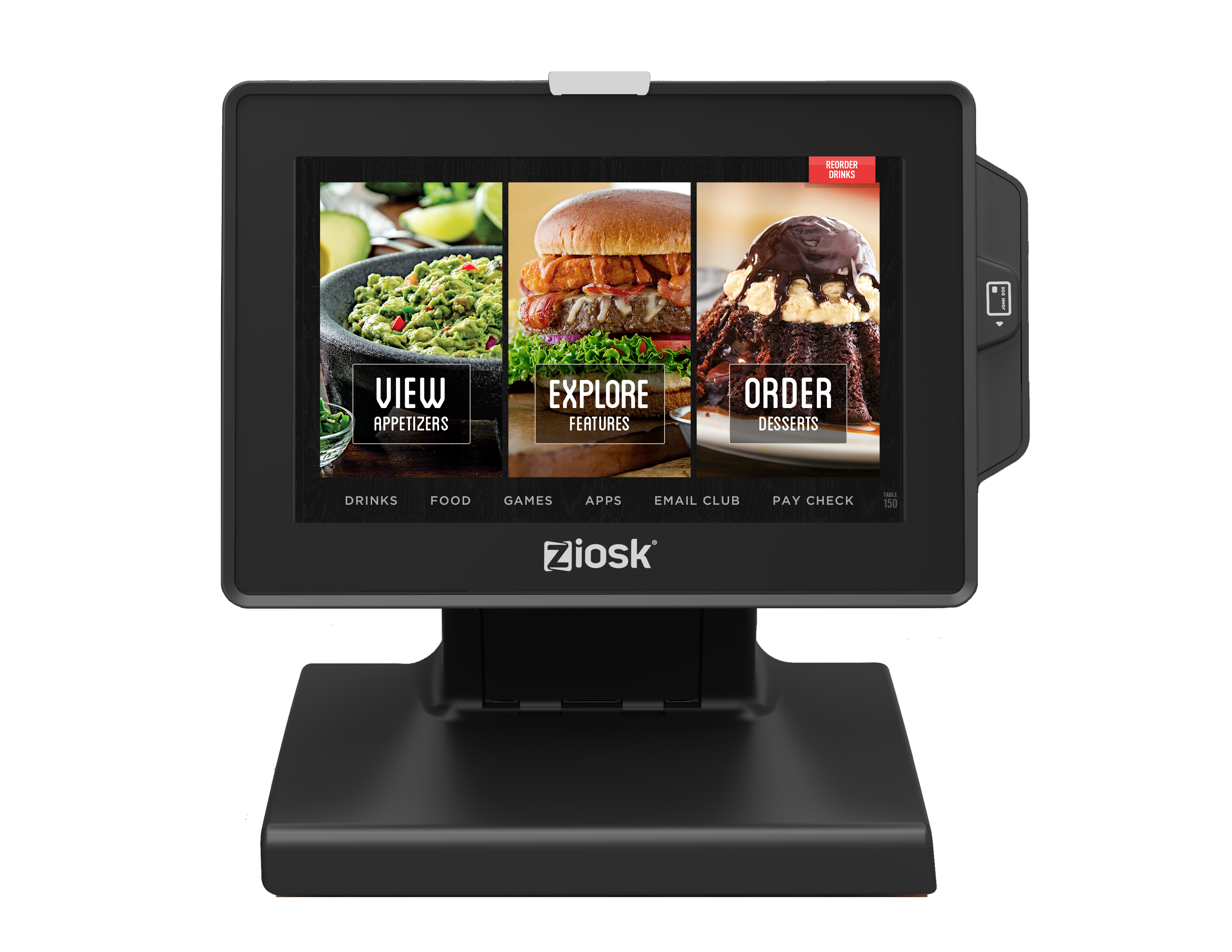
- Original Ziosk tablet
- Type: Private
- Industry: SaaS, Mobile, Restaurants
- Headquarters: Dallas, Texas
- Key people: Jack Baum, Founder; Rhonda Levene, CEO
- Website: ziosk.com

Ziosk is a U.S.-based technology platform company focused on the restaurant industry. It offers tabletop tablets for customers to order and pay for meals, as well as other SaaS products for entertainment, insights, and loyalty programs, built on the Android platform.

== History ==
Ziosk was founded in Dallas by entrepreneur and Southern Methodist University adjunct professor Jack Baum and three of his executive MBA students, Raymond Howard, Viren Balar, and Shawn Gentry.

Baum, an experienced restaurant entrepreneur, assigned them the task of finding a way to reduce the time it took for a restaurant guest to ask for, receive, and pay the check -- usually 7 to 11 minutes. To address this, over a period of years, they developed a tablet with technology allowing guests to pay their bill directly from their table, without the need to summon a waiter and go through the traditional checkout process. It had the added benefit of relieving restaurant staff of low-value tasks and reducing the time they remained at the table. Improving “table-turn” is a proven method for restaurants to boost revenue.

Initially, the interactive tablet, which sits on the diner’s table, enabled guests to reorder drinks, dessert and coffee, and pay the final check, with the waiter taking the orders for the first drinks and main course. Over time, the functionality expanded to include scanning coupons, entertainment, news, and satisfaction surveys providing customer feedback, as well as many other functions.

In 2013, a Chili’s restaurant franchisee deployed Ziosk tablets in his 124 outlets. After further testing, Chili’s announced that they would expand use of the tablets to all Chili’s restaurants in 2013-2014. Chili’s parent company, Brinker International, reported revenue increases of 19.8% in the first quarter of fiscal 2015 “primarily driven by the revenues associated with tabletop devices.” It also reported a 0.2% increase in expenses associated with the installation of the devices. In 2015, Ziosk announced partnerships with Olive Garden and Red Robin Burgers, among other restaurants.

By 2017, Ziosk operated an estimated 180,000 tablets in the United States; that year restaurants transacted $8.9 billion using their technology. In 2020, Ziosk’s expanded their use to include smaller screen versions and handheld tablets. During the COVID period, Ziosk saw use of its tablets increase by 30 percent over 2019. By the end of 2023 Ziosk's 220,00 tablets had processed $11.8 billion in transactions.

== Technology ==
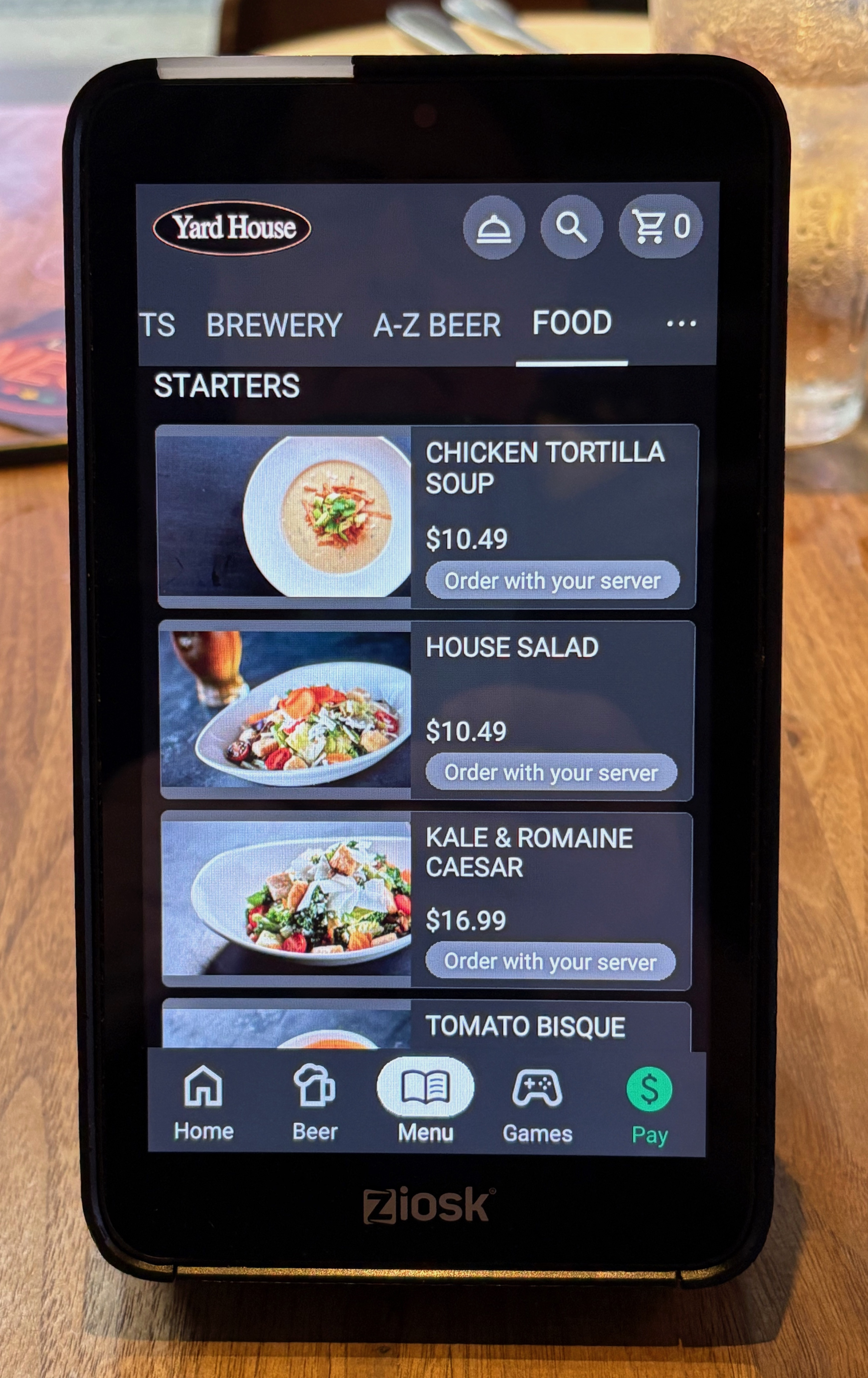
Ziosk tablet, Starters page.

Ziosk tablet software is built on the Android operating system. The tablets accept contactless payments including P2PE, EMV, and NFC Tap to Pay. In 2023, Ziosk announced a partnership with Microsoft to expand use of Microsoft Azure and explore the use of Fabric (One Lake), Microsoft's unified data analytics platform which integrates Azure-based and other data streams. The partnership includes machine learning, real-time insights, and predictive analytics to gain insight from guest’s dining experience. As of 2024, in addition to ordering and payment functions, Ziosk tablets and software include customer loyalty programs, games, guest feedback and surveys, data collection and analytics to help restaurants understand customer behavior, dining trends and other metrics.

== Devices ==
Ziosk Aurizon: An eight-inch landscape display, table-top tablet for use by restaurant guests to order and pay; signal for a waiter, scan coupons, and engage with entertainment, news, surveys, and perform other functions.

Ziosk zMini: A smaller, portrait display, table-top device, for use on bars and smaller tables.

Ziosk Server Pro: A handheld tablet used by restaurant staff to take and manage customer orders by guest and seat number, deliver receipts electronically, and provide other services.

Drop & Pay: A hand-sized digital check presenter tablet that enables guests to pay their checks, calculate tip, take a satisfaction survey, and perform other tasks.

== Privacy concerns ==
Some users of Ziosk tablets have questioned the use of cameras on tabletop ordering tablets, citing privacy concerns. Ziosk responded to the concerns stating that the company does not save or share information from the camera without permission from the user. They also noted that a green light near the top of the device will be activated when the camera is active, and that the camera is used specifically to read coupons.

== Gallery ==
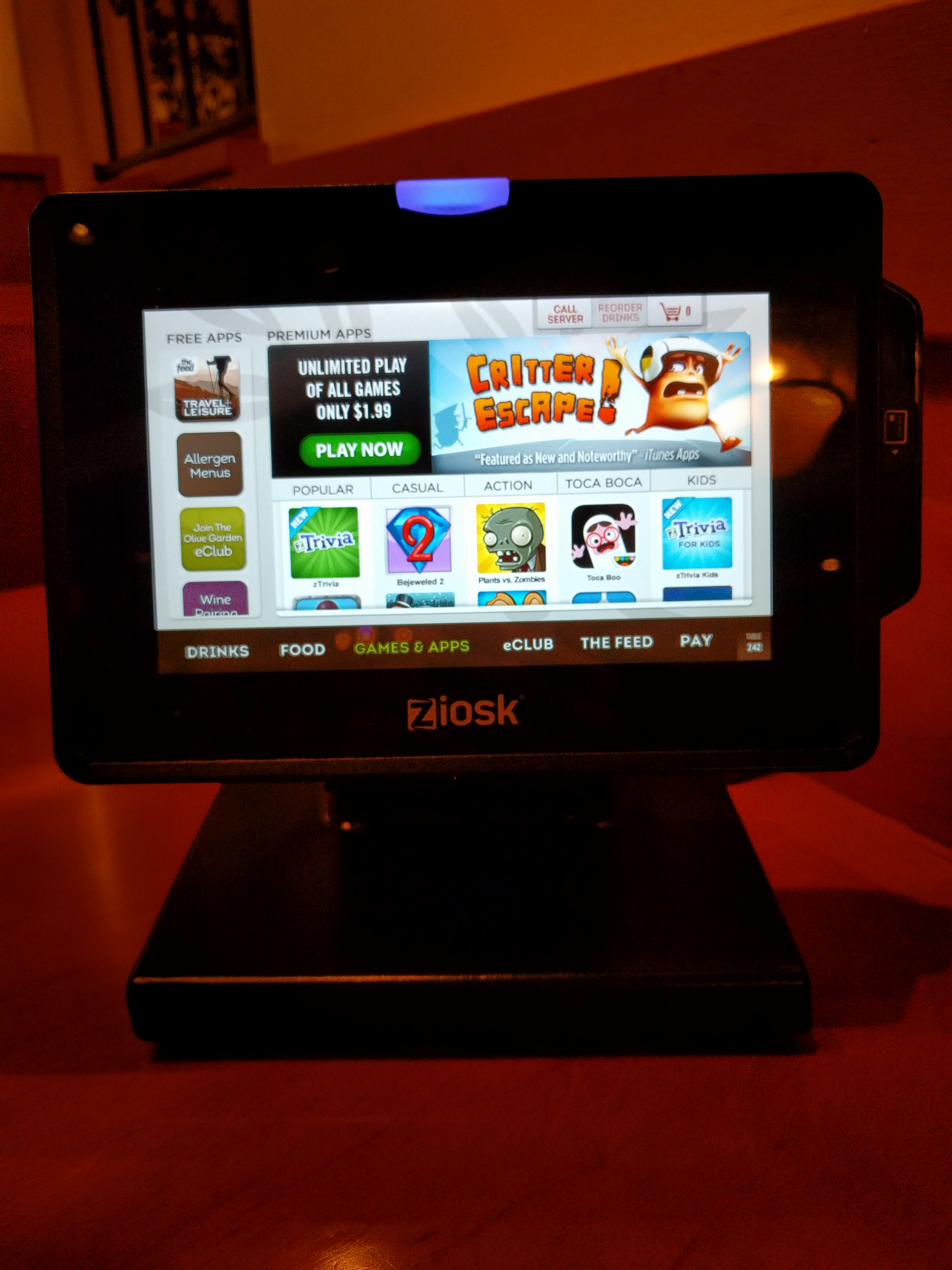
Original Ziosk machine at Olive Garden (2017)

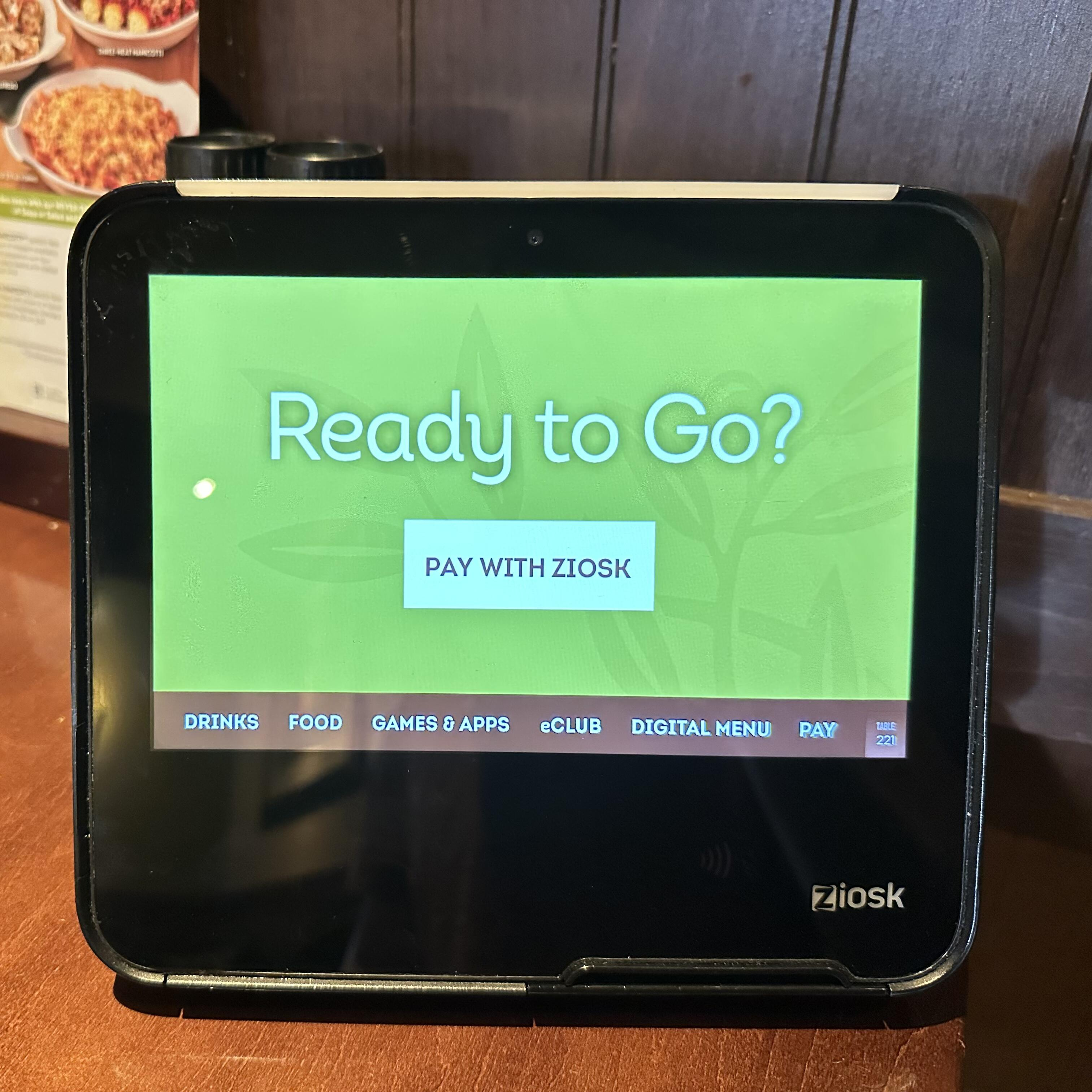
Updated horizontal Ziosk machine at Olive Garden (2025)

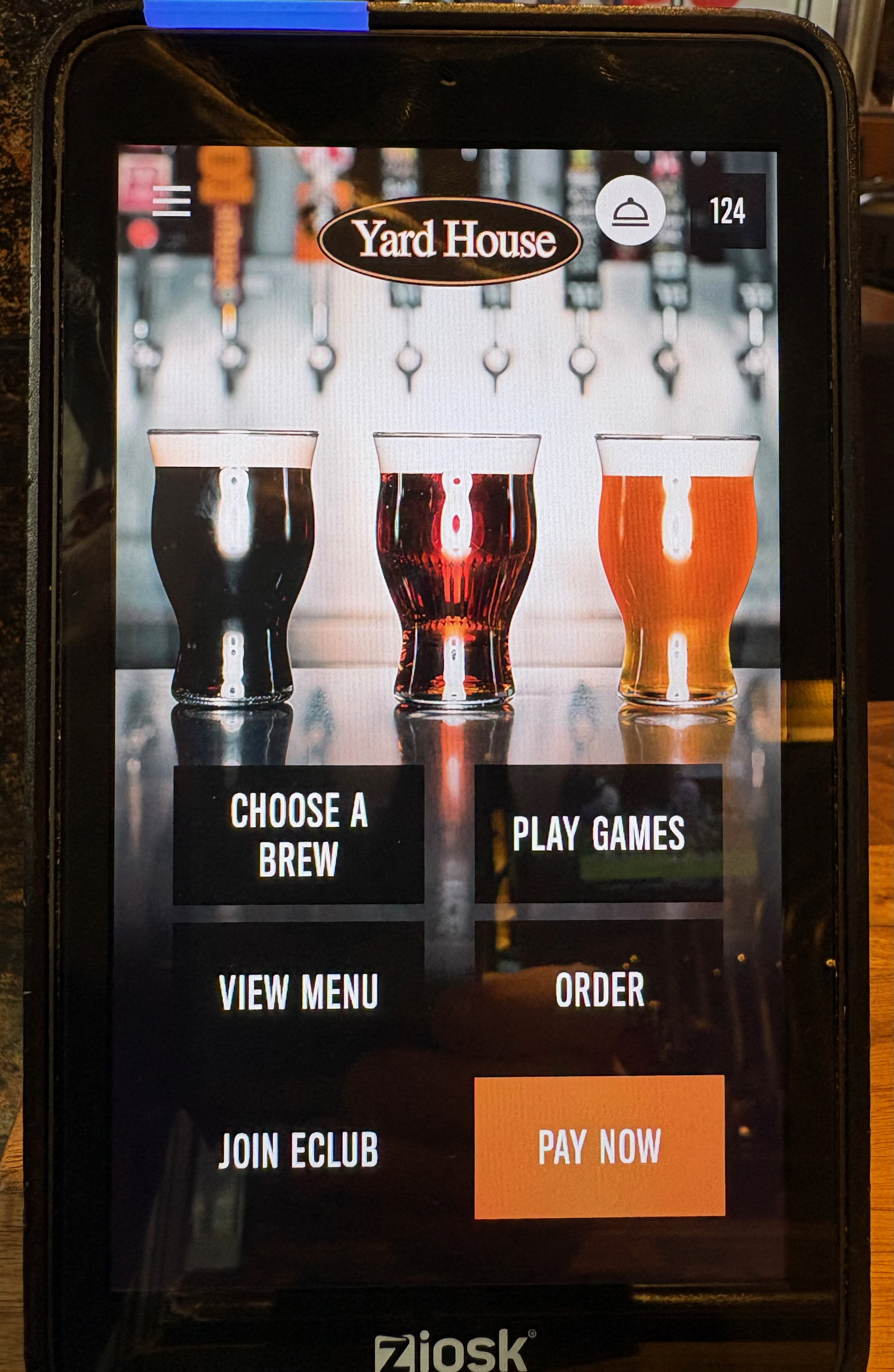
Ziosk vertical machine at Yard House restaurant (2025)
