= Asus Transformer Book Duet =

Tablet computer

Asus Transformer Book Duet TD300
- Developer: Asus
- Type: Convertible tablet
- Released: Cancelled
- Operating system: Android 4.2.2; Windows 8.1
- CPU: Intel Core i7
- Memory: 4 GB
- Storage: Flash memory 128 GB SSD, 1 TB HDD
- Display: 1920×1080 px (aspect ratio 16:9), 13.3 in (34 cm) diagonal
- Graphics: To be announced
- Sound: speaker, microphone, headset jack
- Input: Multi-touch screen; dock keyboard + touchpad; compass; GPS receiver; Ambient light sensors; 3-axis accelerometer-gyroscope
- Camera: To be announced
- Connectivity: Bluetooth v4.0 + EDR (Enhanced Data Rate); Full size HDMI 1.4; Dock 2x USB 2.0; Dock 1x USB 3.0; LAN Ethernet port; DLNA; Wi-Fi 802.11ac
- Power: 5 hours in Windows 8.1; 38 Wh Li-polymer battery, 6 hours in Android
- Dimensions: 216.3 mm (8.52 in) H 342.7 mm (13.49 in) W 12.9 mm (0.51 in) D
- Weight: 1,900 g (4.2 lb)
- Related: Asus Transformer Pad Infinity

The Transformer Book Duet TD300, was a 13.3 inch tablet computer that was developed by Asus. The device used two operating systems interchangeably: Windows 8.1 by Microsoft, and Android 4.1 by Google. The device featured a tablet screen and a detachable keyboard. The device was reported to be cancelled due to opposition from both Google and Microsoft in mid-March, 2014.

== Design ==
The tablet portion of the Transformer Book Duet is 0.5 inches (1.3 cm) thick with a 13.3 inch touch screen available in 1366×768 or 1920×1080 resolution. The back of the screen is a rubberized black plastic, with the volume and power buttons embedded at the top right of the lid. It has a detachable black chiclet keyboard with a key to switch between Windows and Android.

The interchangeability of Android and Windows, coupled with the ability to switch between tablet and ultrabook form-factors have led some news sources to call the Transformer Book Duet a "four-in-one device". Switching between the two operating systems takes about four seconds, according to Asus Chairman Jonney Shih. The computer has an Intel Core i7 processor, and 4GB of RAM. The tablet itself has a 128GB solid state drive, and the keyboard adds 1TB of hard drive storage. The computer also features various ports including HDMI, LAN, one USB 3.0, and two USB 2.0.

Daniel Griffiths of Forbes noted that this is not the first time Asus has experimented with "hybrid" devices. Asus has also developed the Eee PC, a laptop with a 7-inch display; and more recently, the PadFone, a smartphone marketed with companion tablet dock and keyboard dock accessories intended to improve functionality and battery life.

== Reception ==
Since its announcement at the Consumer Electronics Show on January 6, 2014, the Transformer Book Duet has received a high degree of media attention from technology magazines and other mainstream news sources.

Vlad Savov of The Verge said that the Transformer Book Duet would work better as either a 10 or 11 inch device, rather than a 13-inch device, because Android "already struggles to fully capitalize on the real estate on screens of that size." Joel Santo Domingo of PC Magazine said that the Transformer Book Duet is helpful for any consumer or business-person who needs to use both operating systems.

=== Industry objection ===
In March 2014, The Wall Street Journal reported that because Microsoft and Google had both implemented policies which effectively ban the certification of devices which dual-boot both Android and Windows, the Transformer Book Duet would be cancelled, and Asus would pull its similar all-in-one desktops from the market. Both companies had reportedly objected to the concept of dual-OS devices of this nature as early as January 2014. Prior to CES, an analyst believed that Microsoft was discouraging manufacturers from releasing such devices because they would dilute Windows 8 and Windows Phone's software ecosystem (which Microsoft was reportedly planning to unify). He also speculated that Microsoft would penalize OEMs by forfeiting discounts on Windows licenses and refusing to provide them with financing for marketing. Additionally, even though Android is an open source operating system that is freely available, Google's application suite is proprietary, and can only be licensed for devices which are approved by the company. This would prevent such devices from including access to Google Play, Android's primary application store.

== See also ==
- Samsung Ativ Q
