= Cover (hospitality) =

Unit of measurement in the hospitality industry

Cover is a unit of measurement in the hospitality industry. It can refer to a meal, or a customer for whom the meal is served. It is used for the purpose of business forecasting.

== Definition ==
A cover means one customer paying for one meal. For example, a table for four diners can provide 4 covers, but if the table is used for two sittings, that becomes 8 covers.

== Derived statistics ==
- Cover per Occupied Room (CPOR) is one statistic which can be used in forecasting.
- This is the average spent per individual customer, which can be calculated separately for each member of the serving staff.
- Polansky and McCool propose a capture ratio, given by the ratio of "Meal Period Covers Served" divided by the "Number of Persons Available to Eat that Meal".
- This is another statistic which can be used to calculate the allocation of staff, based on the number of predicted covers required.
