= Samsung Ativ Q =

Laptop

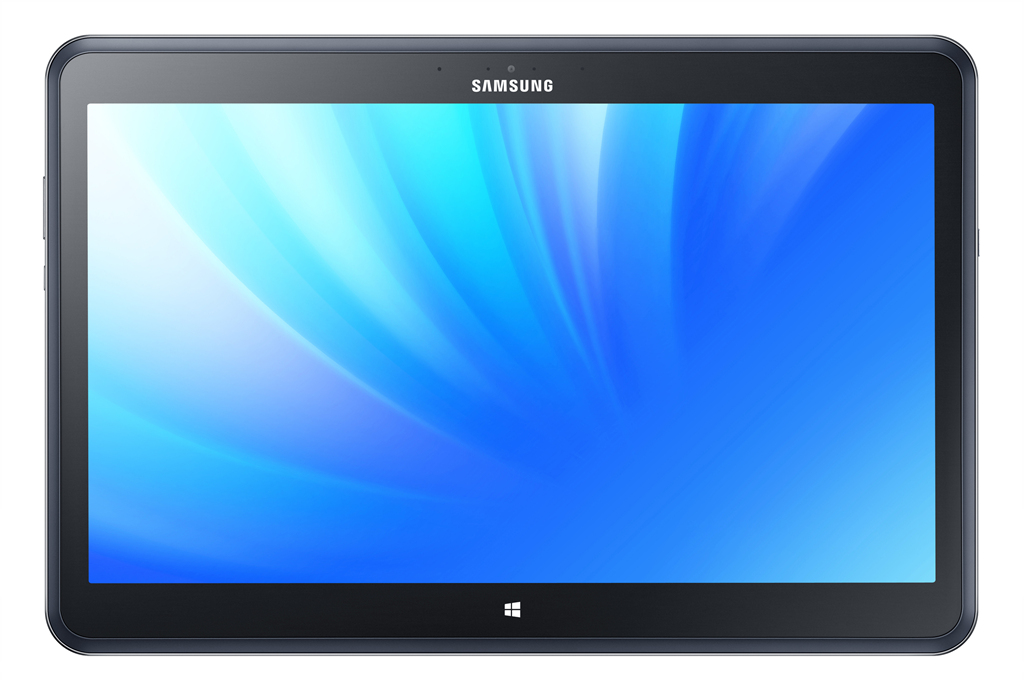
Samsung Ativ Q

The Samsung Ativ Q was a 13.3-inch convertible laptop to be manufactured by Samsung. Unveiled at a Samsung Premiere event on June 20, 2013, the tablet was to run Windows 8, but also shipped with software that also allowed it to run the Android operating system. The Ativ Q's hardware was also distinguished by multiple folding states and a high resolution display.

Samsung announced that the Ativ Q would be released in the third quarter of 2013, with a representative indicating that it would be out in time for the back to school season. However, in August 2013, the South Korean edition of ZDNet reported that the release of the device would be indefinitely delayed due to patent issues relating to its Android emulation system, and Samsung has definitely cancelled the device, knowing there are no ATIV devices anymore

== Specifications ==
=== Hardware ===
The Ativ Q's design incorporates a unique, rugged hinge (which also houses the CPU) that can be used to tilt the screen into a number of different positions, such as flipping it over entirely to use it like a stand, having it "float" above the keyboard on an angle, or in a traditional laptop-styled position. Due to the lack of space, a pointing stick is offered instead of a trackpad.

The Ativ Q uses a 4th generation (Haswell), 2.6 GHz Intel Core i5 4200U processor with 4 GB of RAM. The device features at 13.3-inch capacitive touchscreen with a resolution of 3200×1800 at 275 ppi, and will also ship with an S Pen stylus.

=== Software ===
While Samsung's presentation showcased the Ativ Q running Windows 8.1, demo units of the Ativ Q at its launch event ran Windows 8. The Ativ Q was to ship with a stock version of Android 4.2.2 running inside a virtual machine, accessible from within the Windows environment. Shortcuts and a keyboard button are provided for switching to the Android environment, files can be shared between the two environments, and Android apps can also be pinned to the Windows Start screen. The Ativ Q is also bundled with Samsung's "SideSync" software for linking to and controlling other Samsung smartphones and tablets with Android.

== Release ==
Although Samsung initially announced a late-2013 release in time for the back to school season, the South Korean edition of ZDNet reported in August 2013 that the Ativ Q's release would be delayed or cancelled due to patent issues surrounding its dual-OS functionality.

In March 2014, it was reported that both Microsoft and Google were restricting devices from being shipped with both of their operating systems at once in order to protect their respective market shares and application ecosystems. Pressure from the companies had reportedly resulted in Asus discontinuing its line of similar Windows/Android dual-boot products, including the Transformer Book Duet, which was similarly left in a vaporware state.

== See also ==
- Vaporware
