= Laptop–tablet convergence =

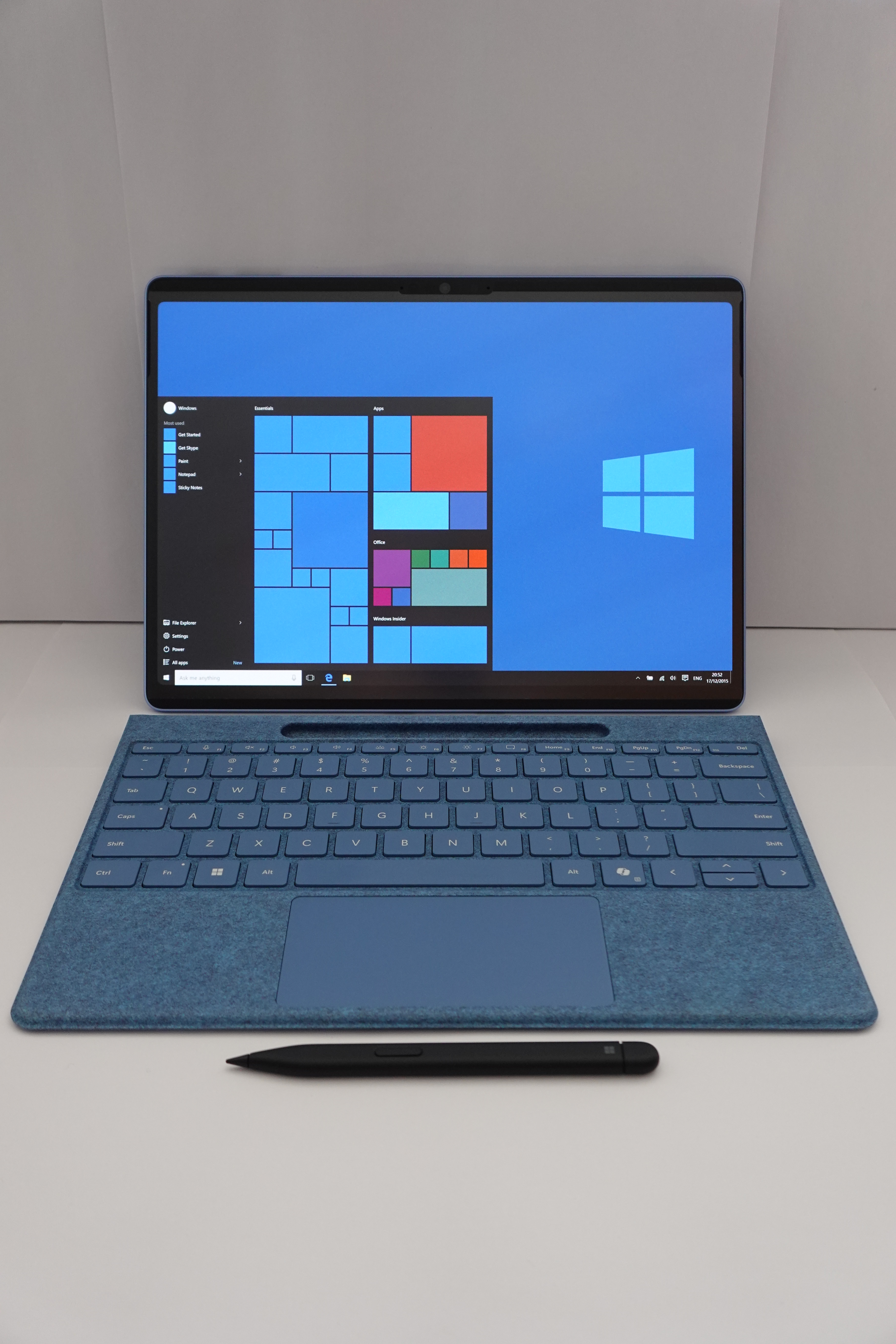
Microsoft Surface Pro 2-in-1 laptop

Laptop–tablet convergence describes the tendency in recent years for laptops and tablet computers to converge technologically.

In 2011, Canonical announced Ubuntu Touch, an attempt to bring Ubuntu to mobile devices such as phones and tablets. It is still under development.

In 2012, Windows 8 was released, which included the Metro UI, a touch-style UI framework for desktop applications. Microsoft encouraged application developers to develop Metro versions of their applications.

In 2014, Google announced that by late 2014, ChromeOS would allow Android apps to be run, meaning that Chromebooks and Chromeboxes would be able to access ordinary web applications, packaged ChromeOS apps, and also Android apps.

== See also ==
- 2-in-1 laptop
- Convertible tablet
