= Table-turn =

Metric of restaurant management

Table-turn, turn, or turn-over in the context of restaurants and other eating establishments refers to the number of parties (covers) served at a table over a set amount of time – such as a lunch or dinner seating, or over the course of a day. It can mean the number of times a table is used (or turned) over a set period or the number of times a seat is used.

A restaurant's turn is considered an important metric of its commercial viability. Generally, to maximize revenue, restaurant managers aim to have as high a table-turn as possible. The faster a guest or a party is seated, the order is taken, served, and the check paid, the sooner the following party can be seated at the table — the quicker the turn, the greater the revenue.

Staff training, improved restaurant design, up-to-date POS technology, and order tracking and payment technology can reduce table turnover time, among other strategies.
